= Fiat 500 (2007) =

City car

Fiat 500 (312)
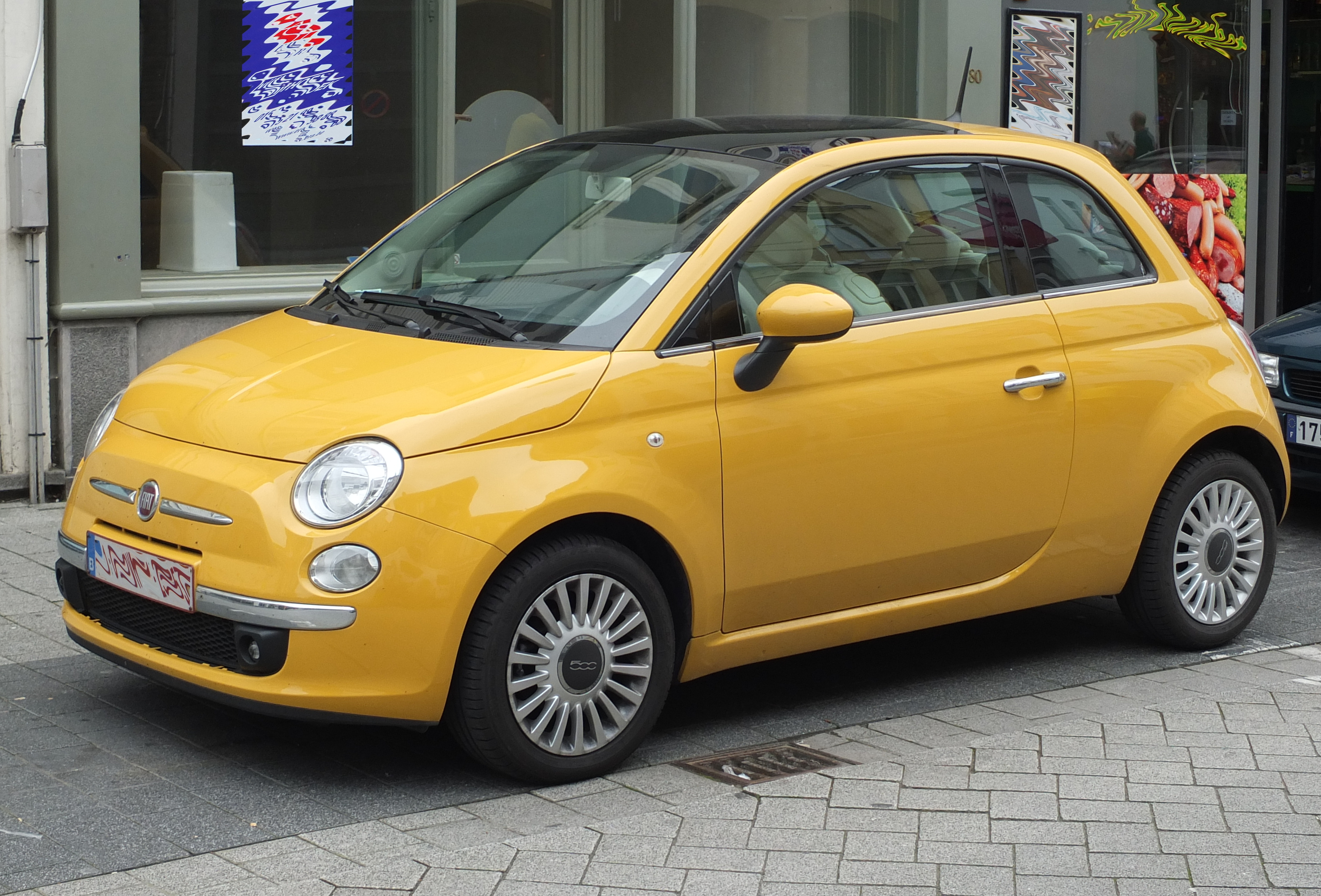

Overview
- Manufacturer: Fiat (Note: Fiat Group Automobiles (2007–2014); FCA Italy (2014–2023); Stellantis Europe (2023–2025))
- Production: 2007–2024 (Poland); 2011–2019 (Mexico); 2023–2025 (Algeria)
- Model years: 2007–2025; 2012–2019 (US/Canada)
- Assembly: Poland: Tychy (Fiat Auto Poland); Mexico: Toluca (Toluca Car Assembly); Algeria: Tafraoui (Stellantis Tafraoui)
- Designer: Centro Stile Fiat: Roberto Giolito (concept); Frank Stephenson (production) with Flavio Manzoni

Body and chassis
- Class: City car (A)
- Body style: 3-door hatchback 2-door cabriolet
- Layout: Front-engine, front-wheel drive
- Platform: Fiat Mini
- Related: Fiat Panda (169); Ford Ka; Lancia Ypsilon (846)

Powertrain
- Engine: Petrol: 0.9 L TwinAir turbo I2; 1.0 L GSE FireFly I3 mild hybrid; 1.2 L FIRE I4; 1.4 L FIRE Multiair I4; 1.4 L FIRE TurboJet I4; Diesel: 1.3 L MultiJet I4
- Transmission: 5-speed manual 6-speed manual 5-speed Dualogic automated manual 6-speed automatic (Aisin)
- Hybrid drivetrain: Mild Hybrid Electric vehicle (500 Hybrid)

Dimensions
- Wheelbase: 2,300 mm (90.6 in)
- Length: 3,546 mm (139.6 in)
- Width: 1,627 mm (64.1 in)
- Height: 1,488 mm (58.6 in)
- Curb weight: 865–980 kg (1,907–2,161 lb) (Global); 1,072–1,149 kg (2,363–2,533 lb) (US)

Chronology
- Predecessor: Fiat 500; Fiat Seicento/600
- Successor: Fiat 500e

The Fiat 500 is an A-segment city car manufactured and marketed by the Italian car maker Fiat, a subdivision of Stellantis, since 2007. It is available in hatchback coupé and fixed-profile convertible body styles, over a single generation, with an intermediate facelift in Europe in the 2016 model year. Developed during FIAT's tenure as a subdivision of FCA, the 500 was internally designated as the Type 312.

Derived from the 2004 Fiat Trepiùno 3+1 concept (designed by Roberto Giolito), the 500's styling recalls Fiat's 1957 Fiat 500, nicknamed the Bambino, designed and engineered by Dante Giacosa, with more than 4 million sold over its 18-year (1957–1975) production span. In 2011, Roberto Giolito of Centro Stile Fiat received the Compasso d'Oro industrial design award for the Fiat 500.

Manufactured in Tychy, Poland, and Toluca, Mexico, the 500 is marketed in more than 100 countries worldwide, including North America, where the 500 marked Fiat's market return after 27 years. The millionth Fiat 500 was produced in 2012 and the two-millionth in 2017, after 10 years. The 2.5-millionth Fiat 500 was produced in the Tychy, Poland plant, in March 2021. The 500 has won more than 40 major awards, including "Car of the Year" (2007) by the British magazine Car and the 2008 European Car of the Year.

== Design and development ==
Since 1998, Fiat's entry-level model in Europe had been the Polish-built Seicento, itself an updated version of the 1991 Cinquecento. These models had only ever been sold with three doors, although Fiat had responded to the growing demand for five-door city cars in 2003 by launching the Panda, which replaced a three-door model of the same name which had slotted into Fiat's European range between the Cinquecento/Seicento and the larger Punto. Around the time of the Panda's launch, Fiat set about developing a three-door city car to replace the Cinquecento. Driven by the tremendous success of the Smart Fortwo, especially in Italy, Fiat began examining a variety of small car concepts "to regain its small-car crown," — developing an "intense interest at producing a Smart (Fortwo) competitor" — and concluding that "most customers want more than just the Smart's two seats."

The 2004 Fiat Trepiùno concept, from which the 500 derives, was introduced at the 74th Geneva Motorshow —designed at Centro Stile Fiat by Roberto Giolito in a style strongly reminiscent of the original Fiat 500^{1957}. The name "Trepiùno" is a contraction of the Italian words tre più uno, or "three plus one" in English; as the design accommodates three adults and one child —this by reducing spatial form factors in front of the front passenger (with high-tech, space-saving, thin materials), sliding the front passenger forward, and positioning the third adult directly behind the passenger, allowing a fourth, smaller, occasional passenger to sit behind the driver.

The concept design was translated into the 2007 production model under the direction of Frank Stephenson. According to Stephenson, aerodynamic concerns were paramount with the new 500, saying his team preferred the look without the spoiler as on the original Nuova 500. Nonetheless, the small rear spoiler at the top of the rear hatch provides a CD of 0.32 — where without the spoiler the drag coefficient would have been 0.40.

The 500 uses a widened variant of the Fiat Mini platform. The 500 features Dante Giacosa's 1964 breakthrough front-wheel drive layout — which ultimately became an industry standard, the layout "adopted by virtually every other manufacturer in the world" for front-wheel drive automobiles. Announced on May 5, 2006, photographs of the 500 were presented on March 20, 2007, officially debuting on July 4, 2007, with 250,000 people in attendance and with new models prominently displayed in 30 Italian cities.

The 500 uses Fiat's Multiair hydraulically actuated variable valve timing (VVT) engine technology, winner of the 2010 International Engine of the Year, as well as Popular Science's "Best of What's New".

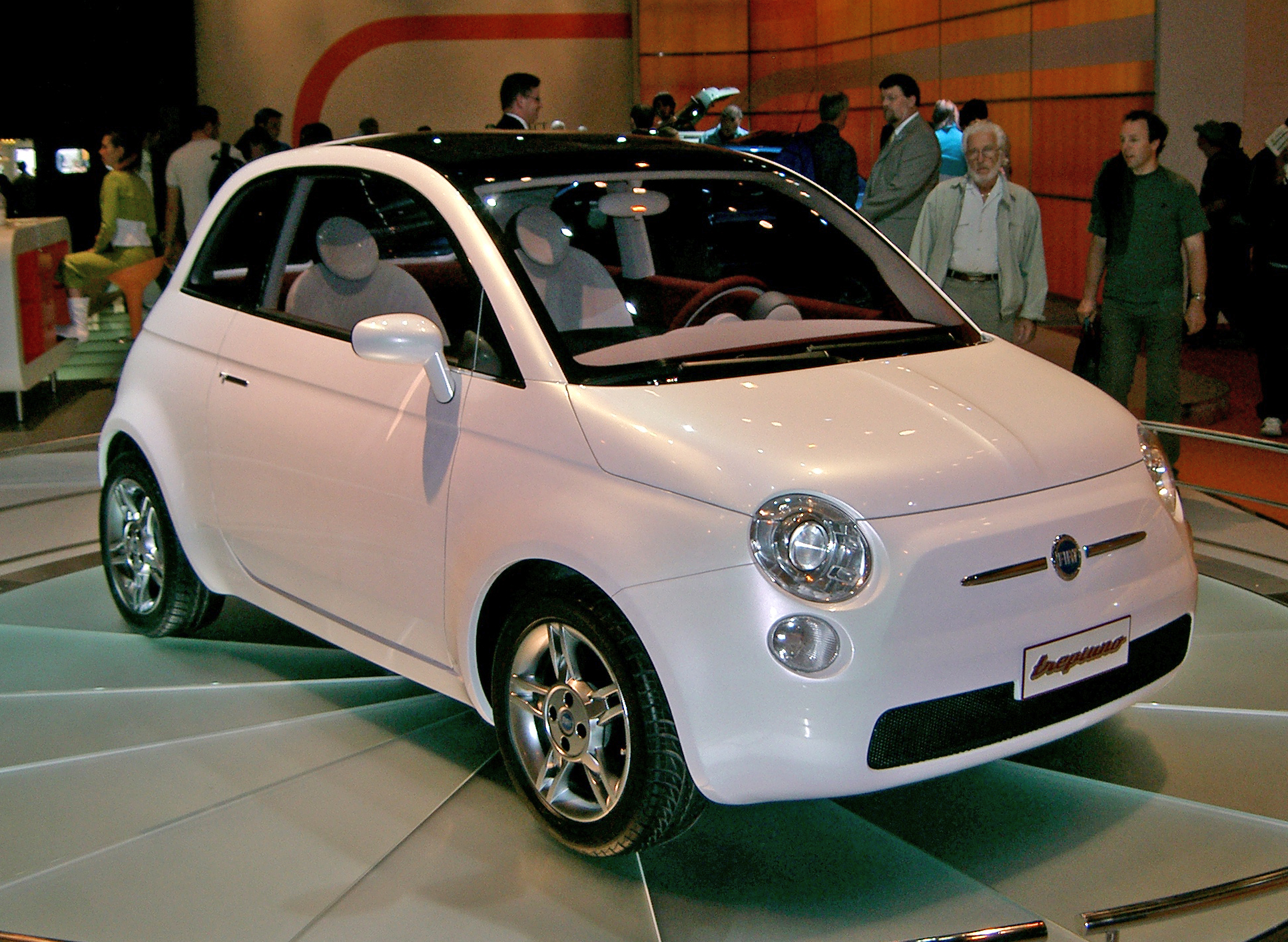
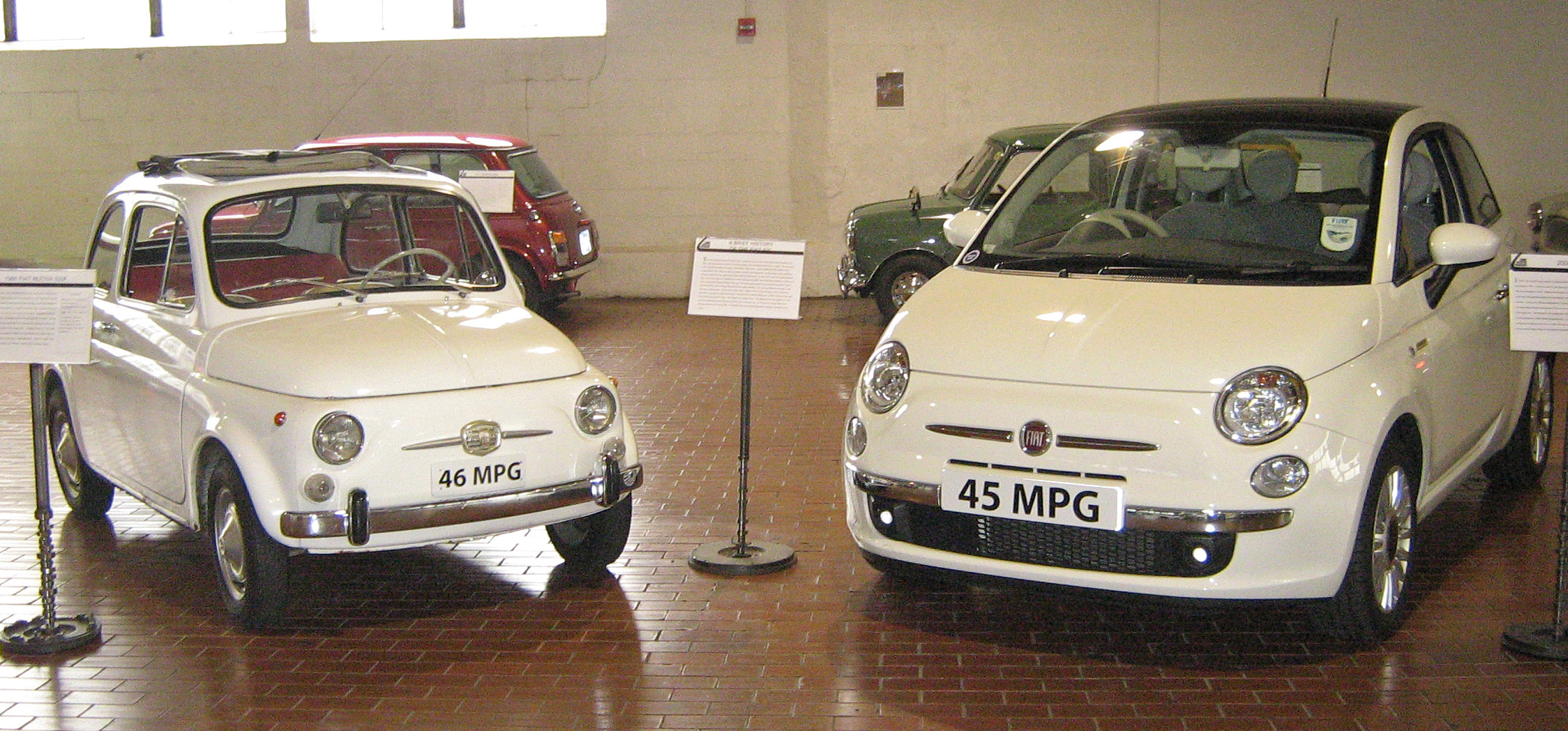
Left to right: 2004 Fiat Trepiùno concept, the original 500 (model year 1966 shown) and the 2007 500. The new 500 is 0.5 m longer and 0.3 m wider than the original.

=== 2016 facelift ===
For the 2016 model year, the Fiat 500 and Fiat 500C received a facelift including redesigned grille and reshaped headlights incorporating daytime running lights with LED technology; revised 15" and 16" alloy wheels; new paint colors, rear bumper chrome strip with fog lights and rear taillights featured integrated LEDs. Interiors have revised controls and a redesigned steering wheel. Available trims are Pop, Pop Star, Lounge and S. Three engines are available in Europe: 1.2 petrol, 0.9 Twin Air petrol in either 85 or 105 hp setup, all Euro 6 emission compliant.

The facelifted 500 (and in some markets, the 1957 Edition) were introduced with strong product placement tie-ins with Charlie Puth's debut single, "Marvin Gaye" — in both the song's video as well as prominent print advertising.

For 2020 Fiat includes a Mild Hybrid version accompanied by a 1.0 three-cylinder engine with a combined power of 70 hp. All models now have a 7-inch screen along with Android Auto and Apple CarPlay, a version called RED was released, with the proceeds going towards ending AIDS and COVID-19.

=== Pre-facelift styling ===
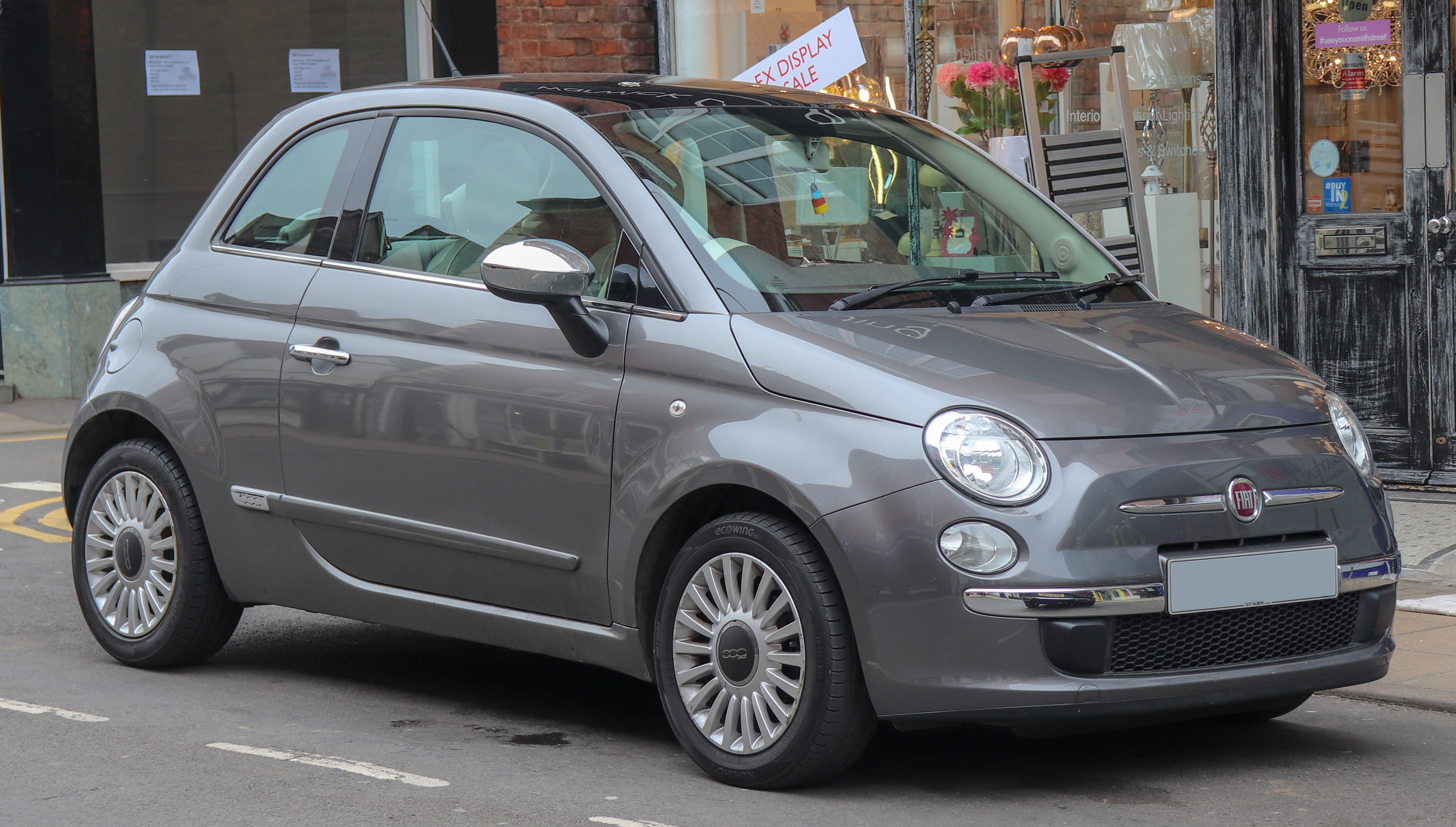
Front

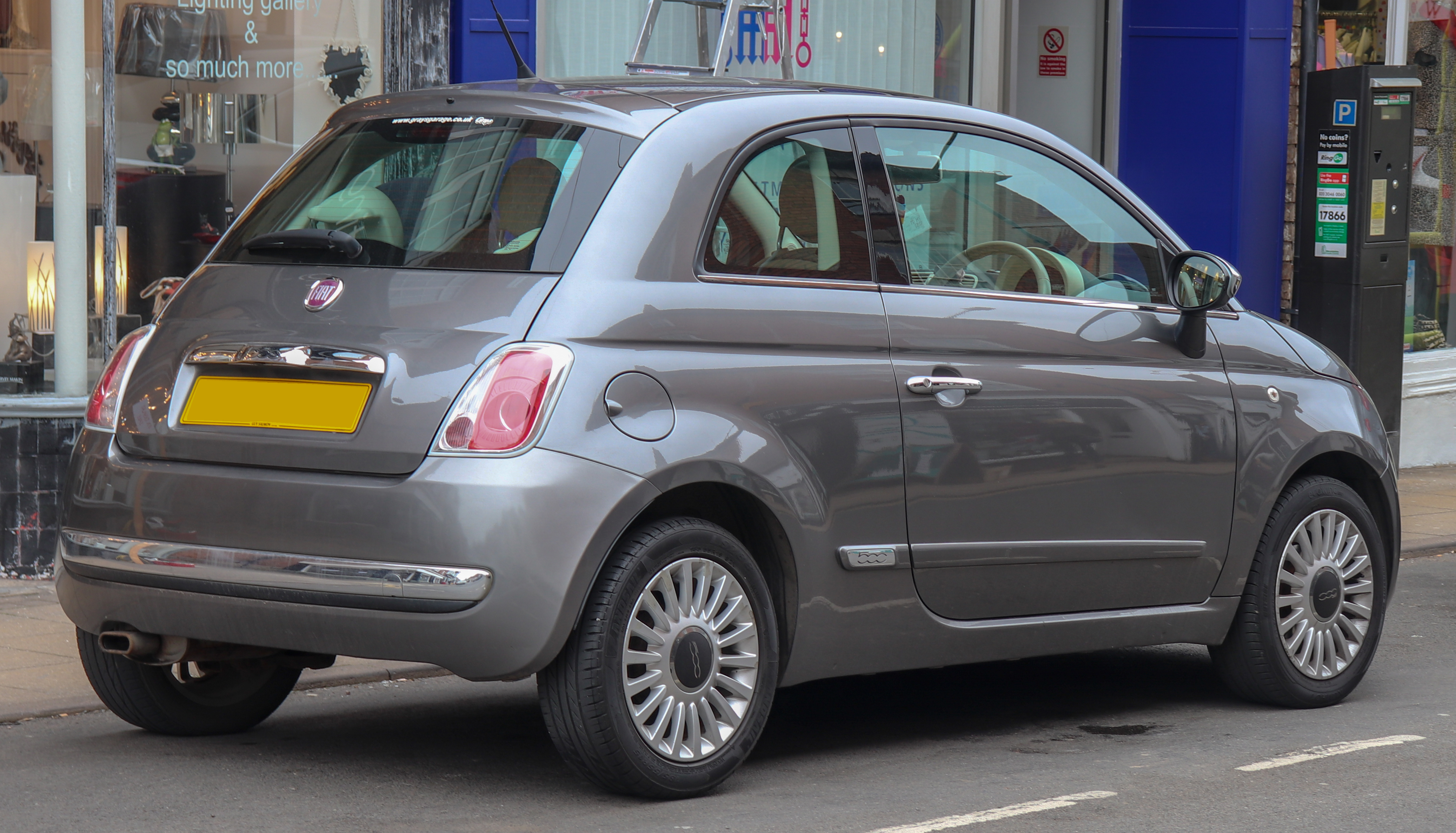
Rear

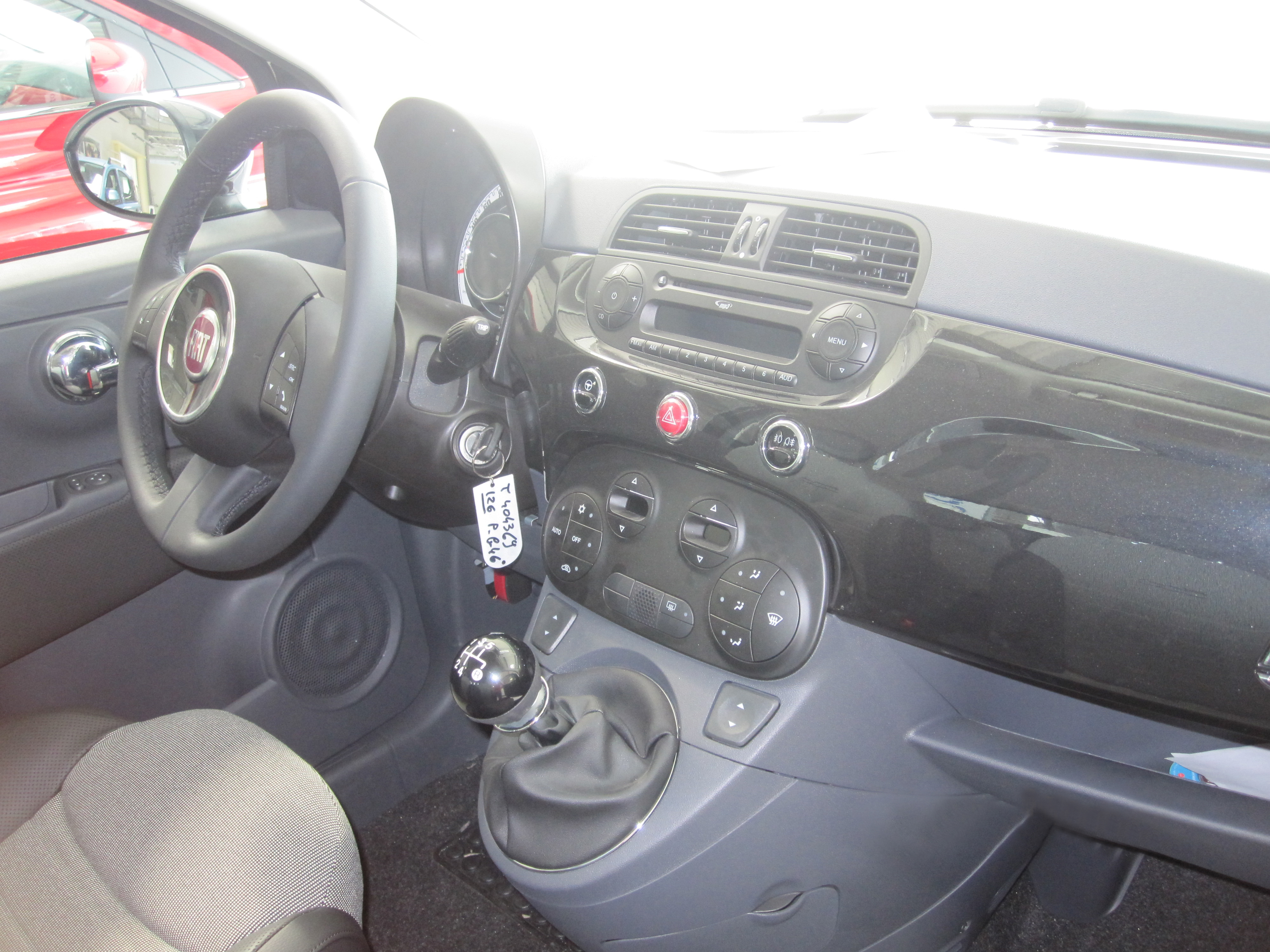
Interior

=== Post-facelift styling ===
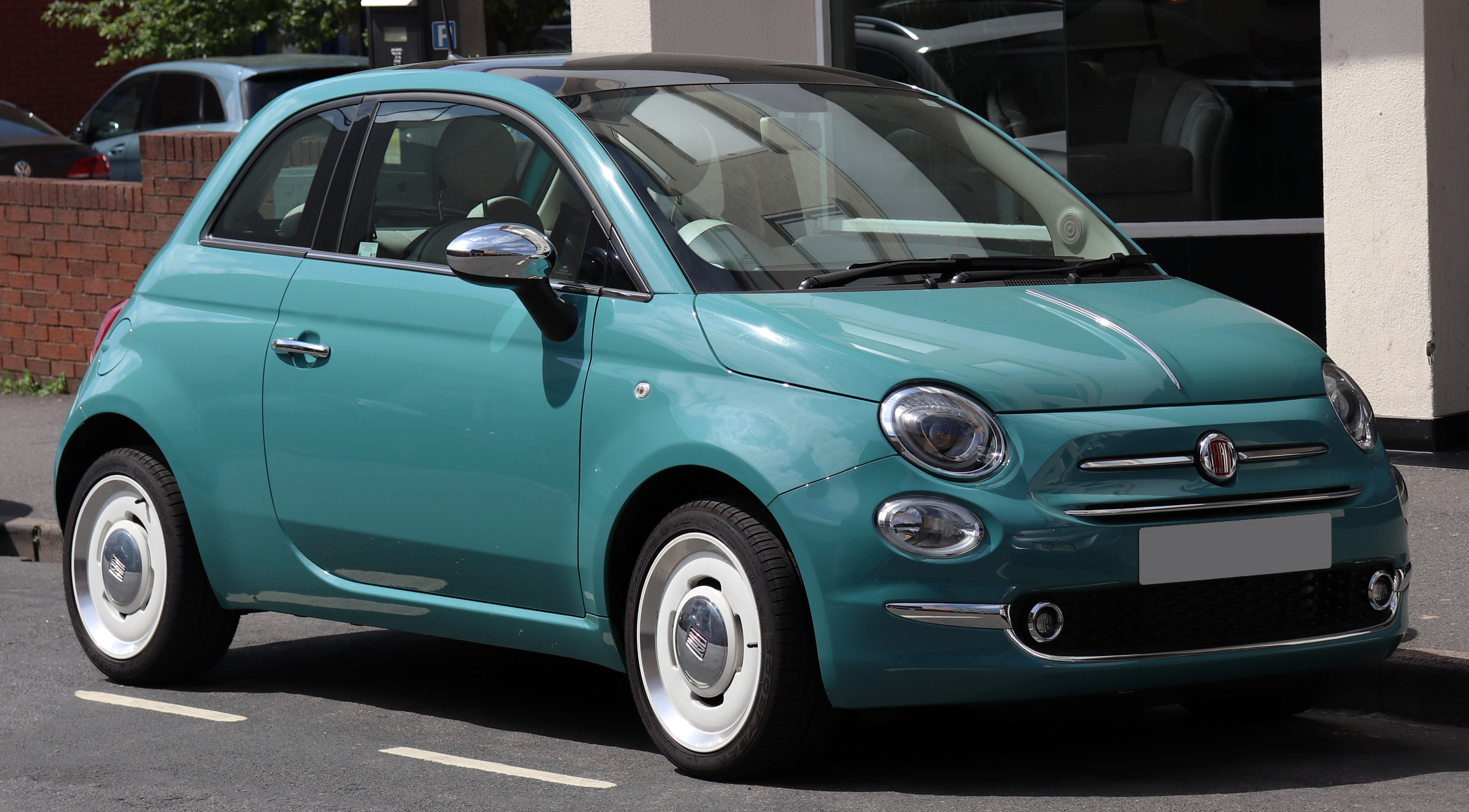
Front

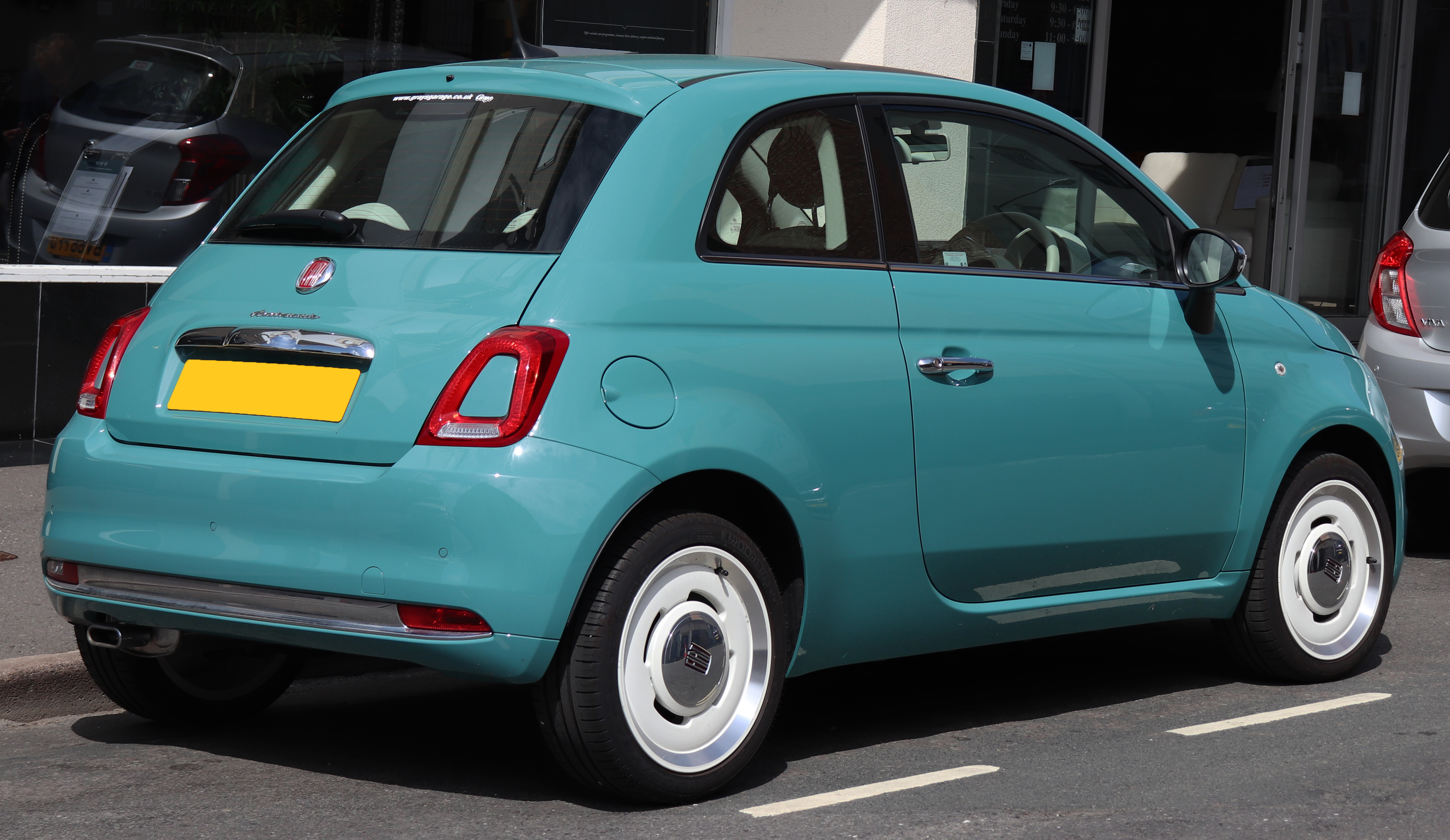
Rear

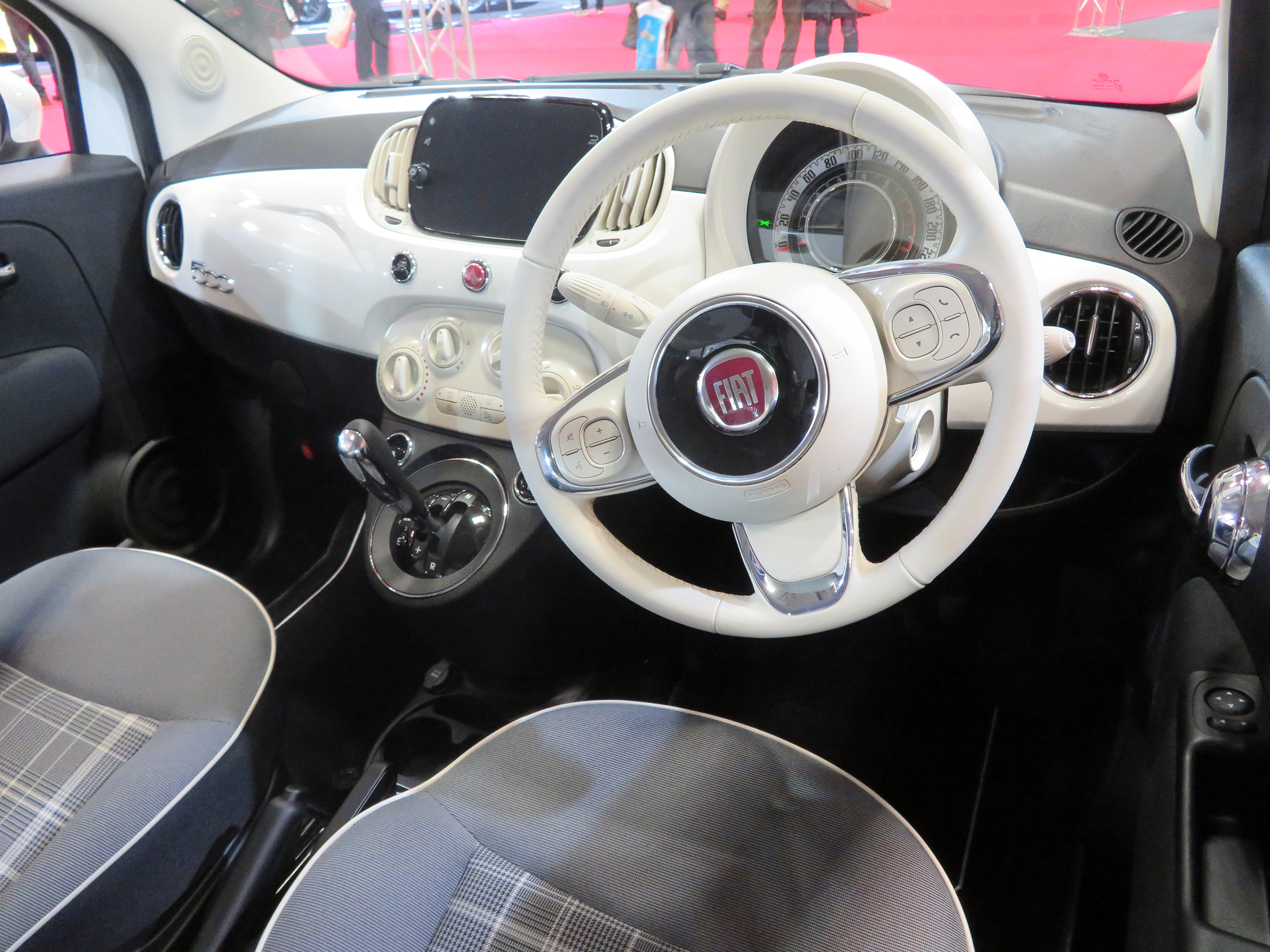
Interior (2019)

== Models ==
In addition to the distinct 500C (Cabrio), Abarth (full sport), and 500e (all-electric) models, the 500 is marketed variously around the globe with other trim levels — for example, the Sport and Turbo trim levels in the United States, and the Pop Star trim levels in Europe.

=== 500C (since 2009) ===
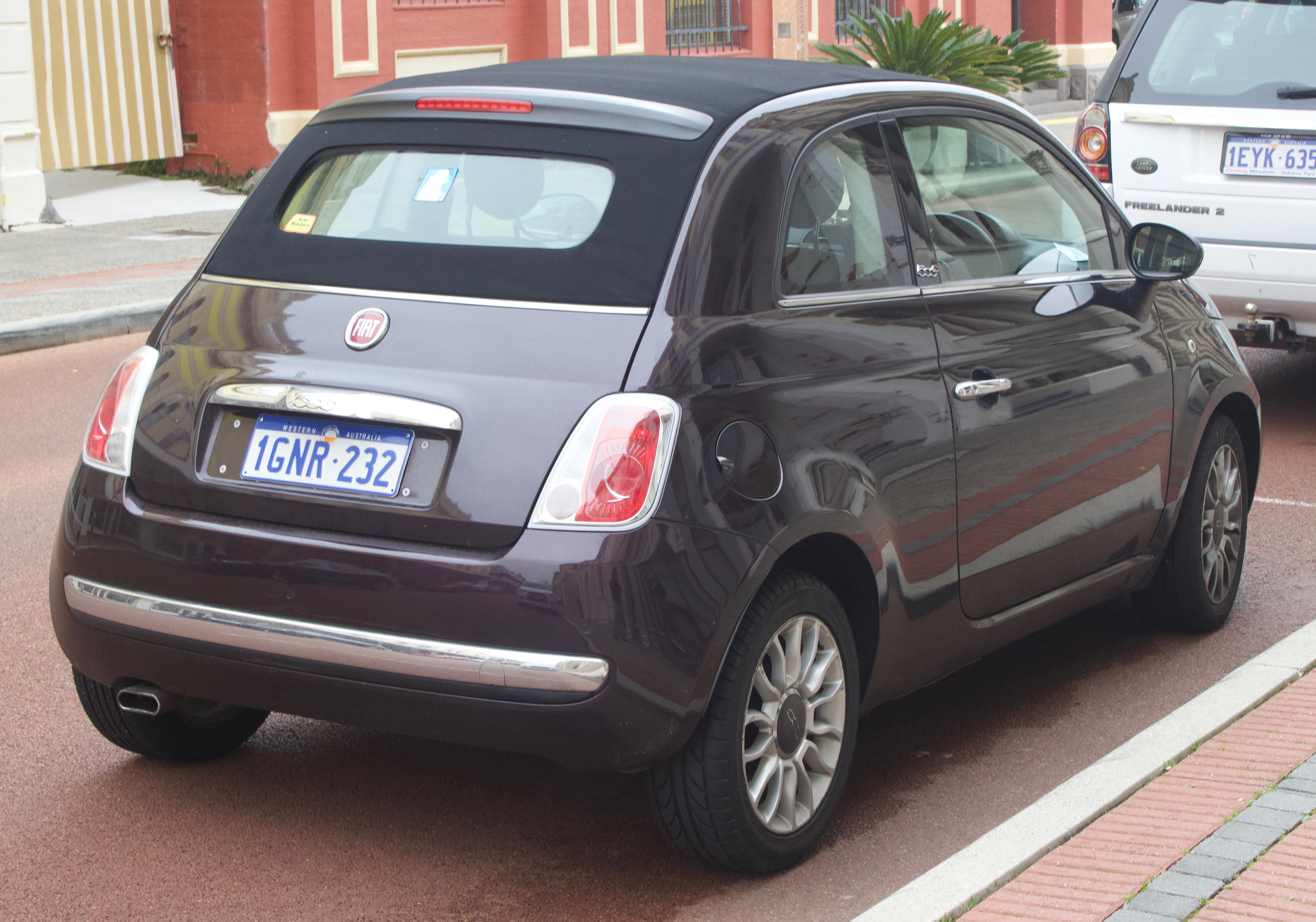
500C pre-facelift

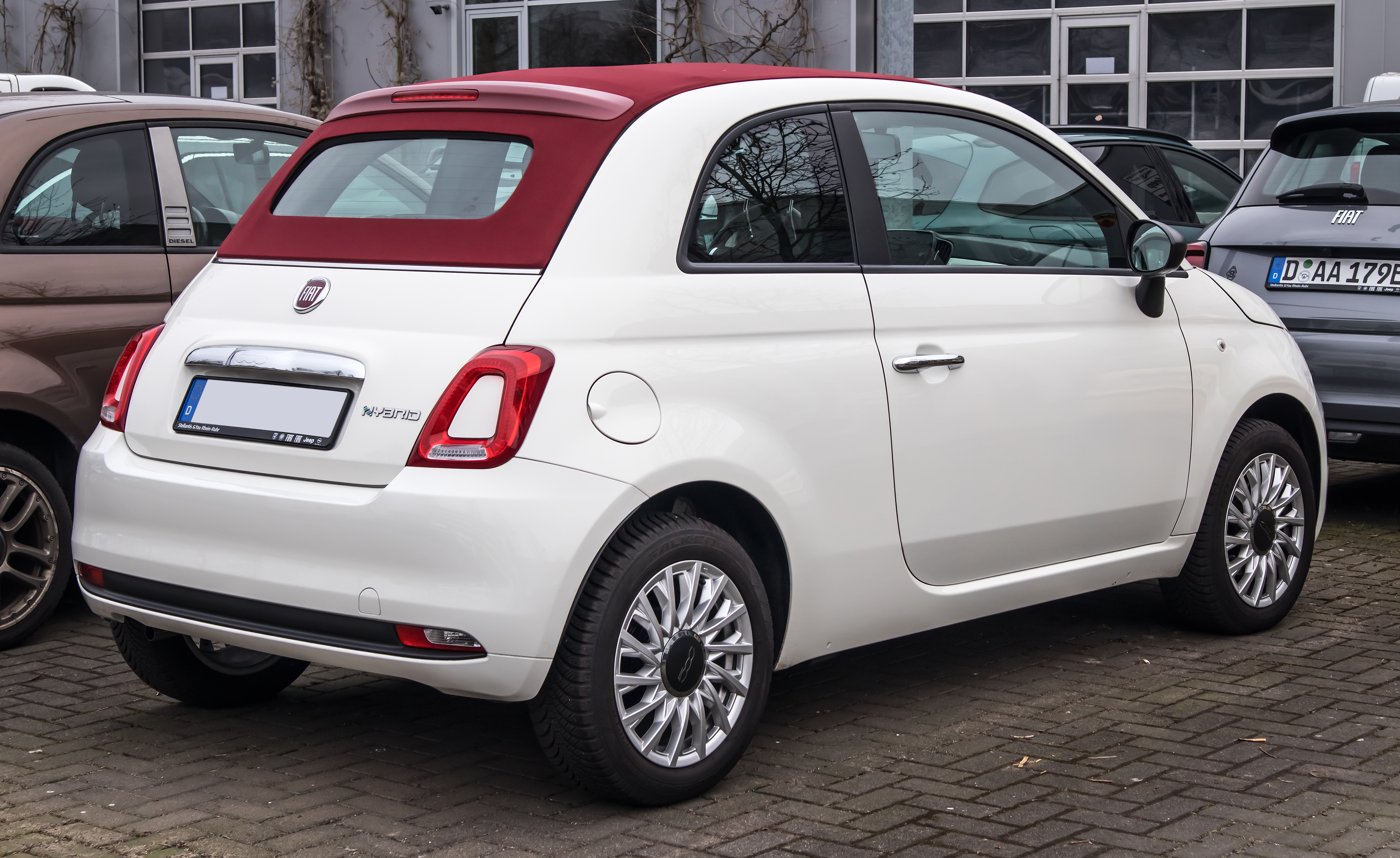
500C facelift

The fixed-profile convertible variant of the 500 debuted at the Geneva Motor Show in March 2009 designated the 500C (C for Cabrio), historically recalling the fixed-profile convertible of the original 1957 Fiat 500, as well as similar fixed-profile convertible such as the Vespa 400 (1957), Citroën DS 3 (2013), Nissan Figaro (1991), Citroën 2CV (1948–1990) and the Nash Rambler Convertible "Landau" Coupe (1950).

The 500C features fully stamped body-side panels retaining the hatchback 500's profile (door frames, roof pillars and side windows) to increase structural rigidity, reduce scuttle shake, and retain side and curtain airbags, in exchange for a less open experience than a fully pillarless convertible. Weighing 40 kg (88 lb) more than its hatchback counterpart, the 500C features a slightly longer windshield than the hatchback, with a concealed and reinforced upper structural cross-member, a stronger front cross-member behind the instrument panel, a rear strut on which the retracted roof folds, reinforced B-pillars, and the rear anti-roll bar setup from the Abarth, high-performance model.

The top itself is a dual-layer, three-position power-retractable cloth top with a glass rear window, electric defroster and an integrated color-matched spoiler with a center high-mounted stop lamp that remains visible with the top in any position. The top retracts in three stages: over the two front passengers, over all four passengers (to the rear spoiler), and fully retracted with its stack folded behind the rear head restraints just above the rear cargo opening. The top is controlled either via the key remote or by open/close buttons at the windshield header adjacent to the interior ceiling light and retracts to the first two stages at speeds up to 60 km/h (37 mph), to its third stage at up to 80 km/h (50 mph) — and is available in black, tan, or red.

With its 50/50 split-fold rear seats in their upright position, the 500C rear cargo capacity is reduced from 9 cubic feet (250 L) to 5.4 cu ft (150 L) compared to the hatchback, which offers 23.4 cu ft (660 L) of cargo volume with the 50/50 split-fold rear seats folded. At its rear trunk lid, the 500C features "parallelogram" liftgate hinges. When the rear cargo lid is opened while the top is fully lowered, the top automatically closes partially for greater cargo access. Because of limited rear visibility, 500C models are equipped with an ultrasonic rear park assist system to audibly indicate obstacles when backing.

=== Abarth 500 (since 2008) ===
Abarth 500
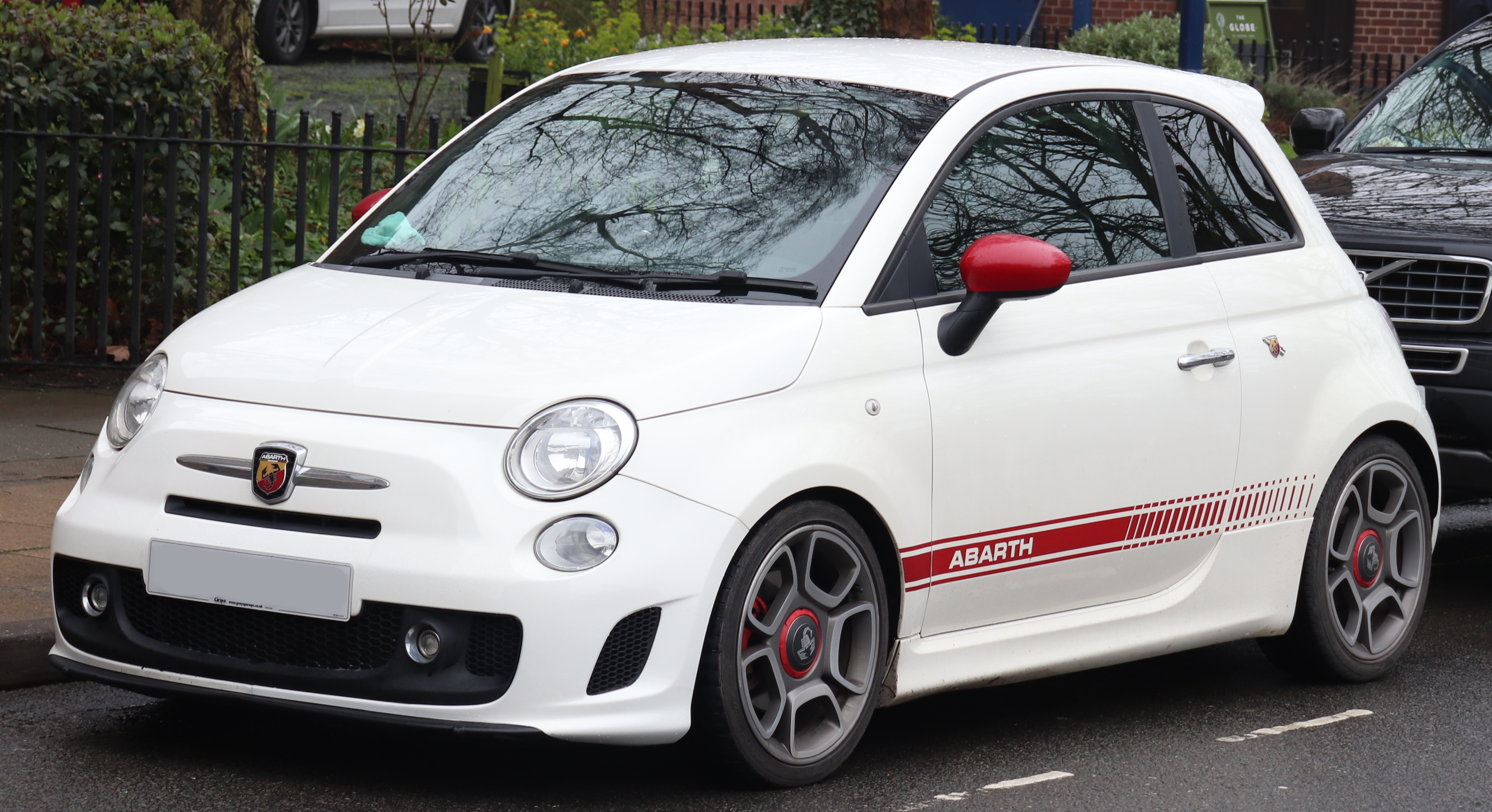

Overview
- Manufacturer: Abarth & C. S.p.A.
- Production: 2008–2024
- Model years: 2009–present

Body and chassis
- Class: Hot hatch
- Body style: 3-door hatchback 3-door cabriolet
- Layout: Front-engine, front-wheel drive
- Doors: 2

Powertrain
- Engine: 1.4 L Fire TurboJet I4 (petrol)
- Power output: 160 PS @ 5,500 RPM
- Transmission: 5-speed manual 5-speed MTA automated manual transmission 6-speed Aisin AW60T-6F25 Automatic

The Abarth 500 is a performance model of the Fiat 500 tuned in-house by FCA's Abarth subsidiary. It was unveiled at the 78th Geneva Motor Show, a year after the rebirth of Abarth brand and company. All models use a turbocharged and intercooled version of the 1.4 L Fire I4 petrol engine.

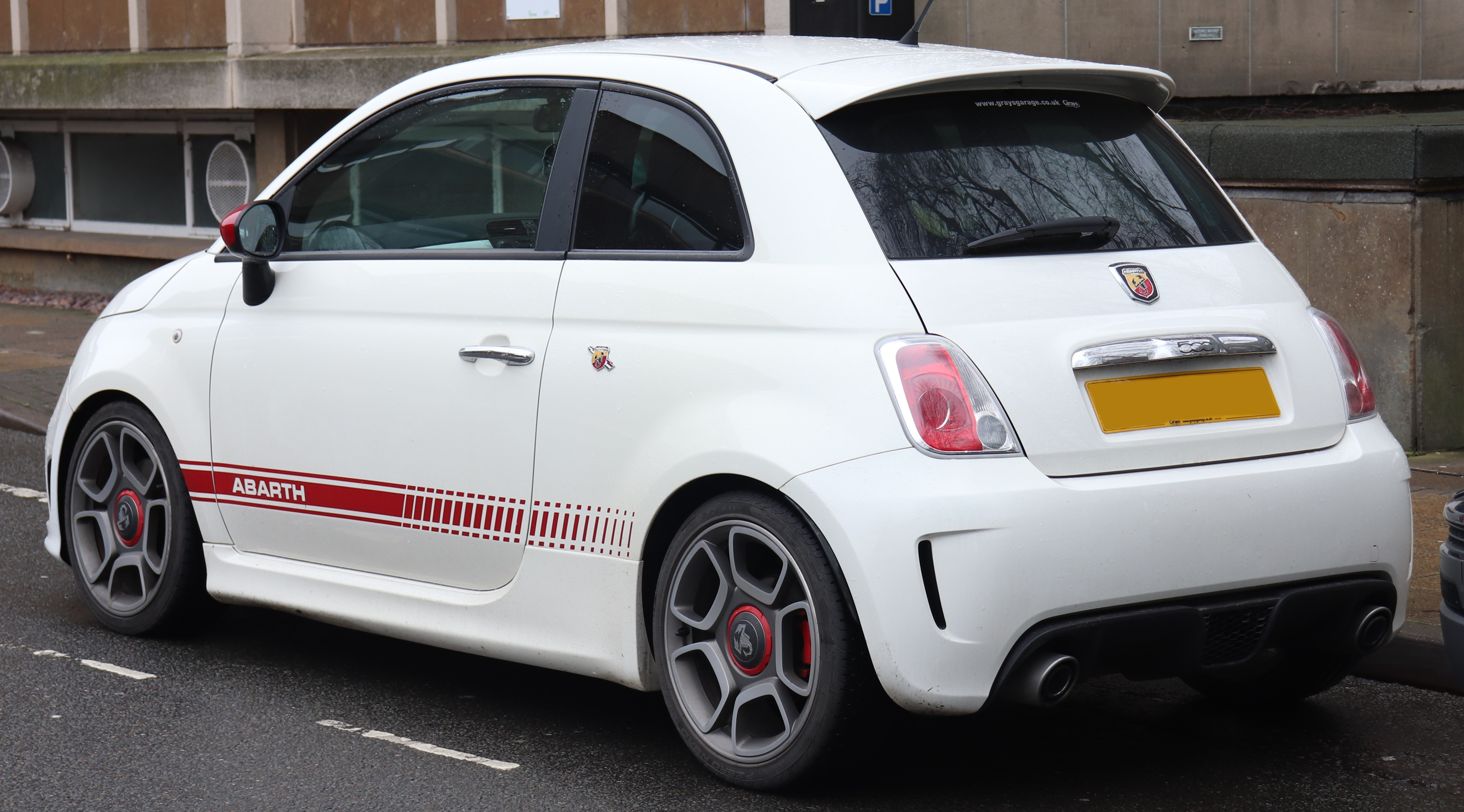
500

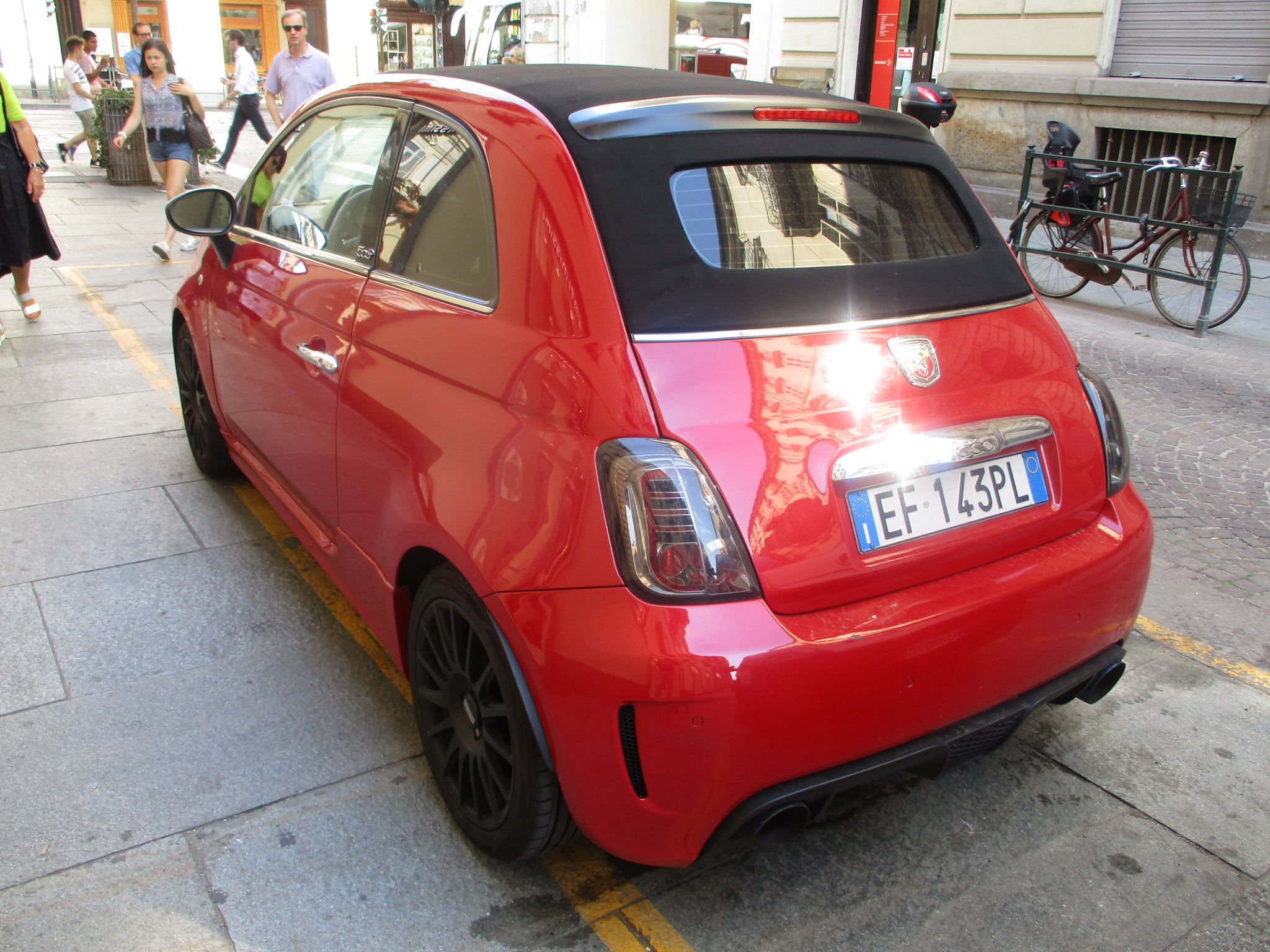
500C (aftermarket taillights)

The Abarth 500's 1.4 L engine is equipped with an IHI RHF3-P turbocharger, and is rated at 135 PS (99 kW; 133 hp) at 5,500 rpm and 180 N⋅m (133 lbf⋅ft) (206 N⋅m (152 lb⋅ft) in sport mode) torque at 3,000 rpm. It includes a five-speed C510 transmission, low ride suspension, electric power steering with sport setting, 6.5 x 16" aluminium alloy rim with 195/45 R16 tyres and four-wheel disc brakes (front ventilated). Interior includes turbo pressure gauge, gear shift indicator, aluminum foot pedals, Blue&Me entertainment system with telemetry and GPS. The car costs £13,600 in the UK. A 5-speed automated manual transmission (called MTA) is available as an alternative to the manual transmission.

Later, in 2016, the facelift version was released, introducing several different variants of the 595, ranging from 140 PS to 180 PS. The lineup was composed by (in order of power):

- Basic 595
- Turismo
- Pista
- Competizione (180 PS)
- Esseesse (180 PS)

Later, in 2020 new very limited "Scorpioneoro" edition and "Yamaha Monster Edition" were released. The Scorpioneoro is easily distinguishable due to the gold details on the paintwork and wheels. The interior of the Scorpioneoro also has details such as a scorpion pattern on the seats and gold stitching. The Scorpioneoro has 165 PS, just like the Turismo variant. The Yamaha Monster Edition show the link between the Moto GP team and Abarth, painted black and blue, and with Monster energy drink logos.

The Abarth version of the 500C (cabriolet) was unveiled at the 2010 Geneva Motor Show. Abarth 500C has a top speed of 205 km/h (127 mph), and it can accelerate from 0–100 km/h (0–62 mph) in 8.1 seconds.

=== Abarth 595 ===
In 2012 the Abarth range was enlarged with the addition of the 135–160–180 PS (99–118–132 kW; 133–158–178 hp) Abarth 595. Four versions are available, both with either manual or MTA transmission and in hatchback or cabriolet body style: Custom, Turismo, Competizione, Kit Elaborazione.

The Abarth 595 Custom is the launch version with 135 hp. The Abarth 595 Turismo features standard leather upholstery, upgraded dampers, and climate control, Xenon headlights, and Alutex interior details. The sportier Abarth 595 Competizione replaces leather seats with Sabelt cloth sport seats and Alutex with aluminum while adding cross-drilled brakes and the Record Monza dual-mode exhaust. The Kit Abarth Elaborazione 595 is a powerful kit for the Custom version, with 160 hp engine, BMC Air sport filter, Koni FSD suspensions, Brembo HP1000/1 forward pads, Eibach low springs and new badge 595.

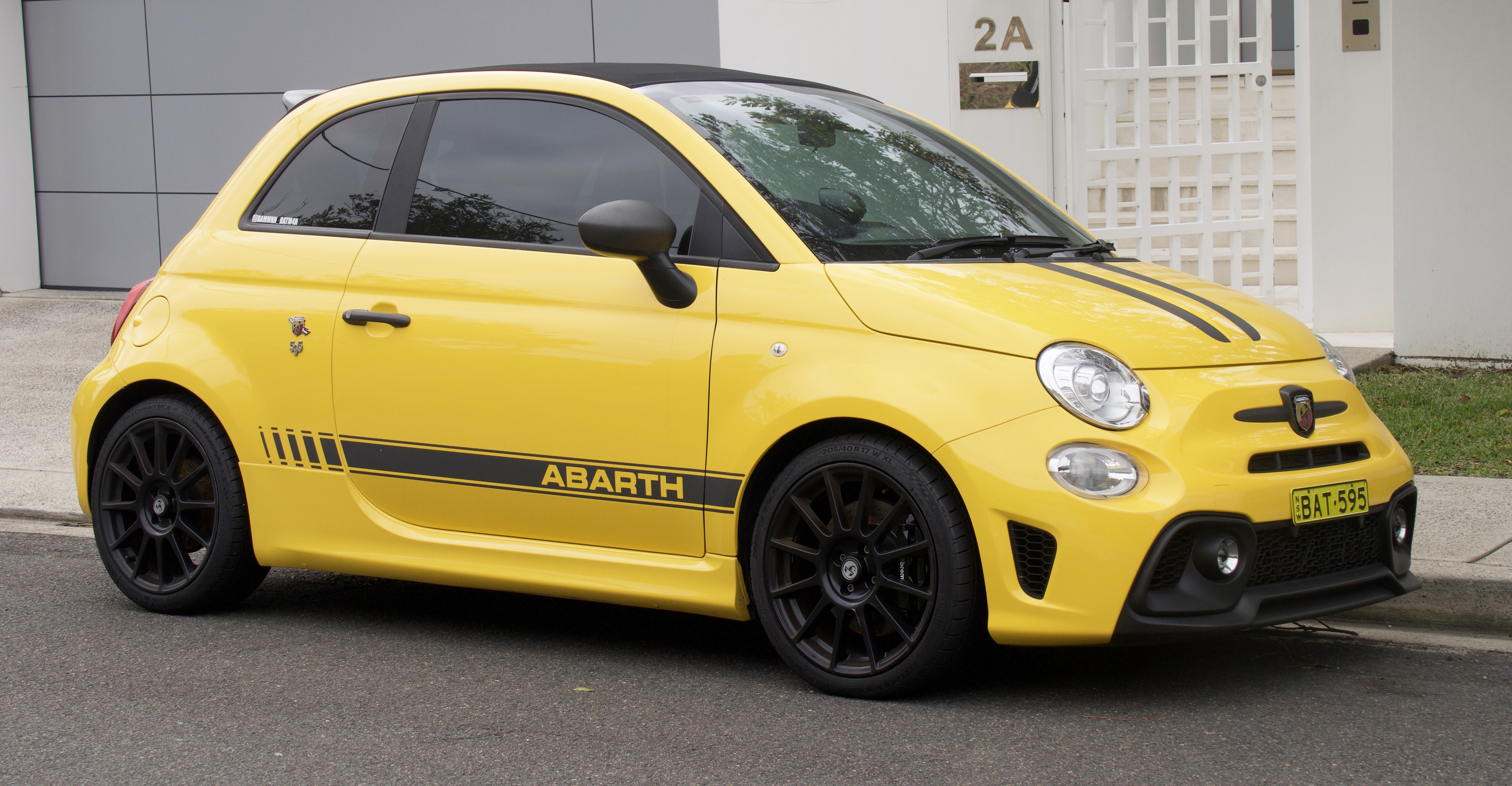
Abarth 595C Competizione

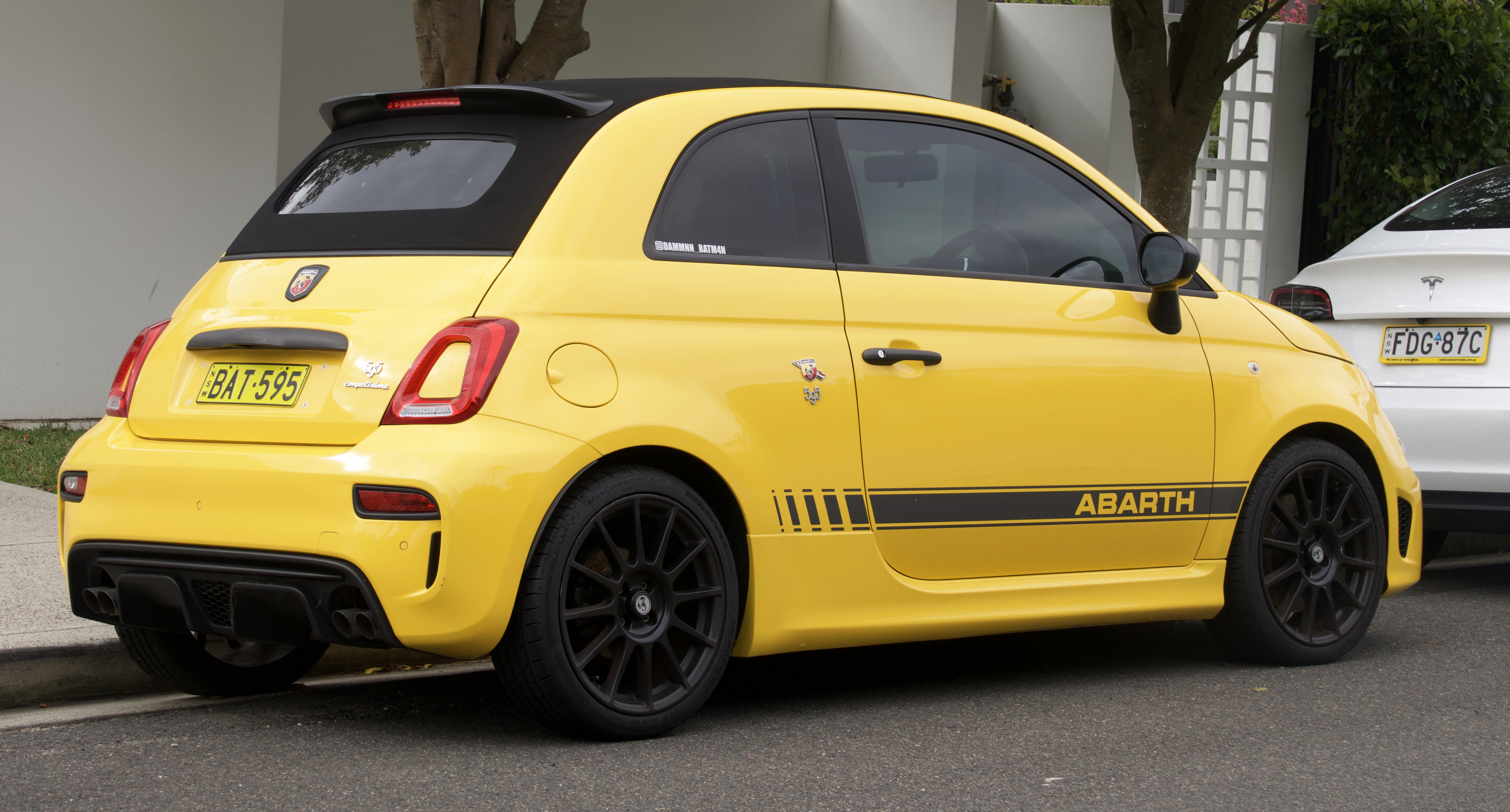
Abarth 595C Competizione

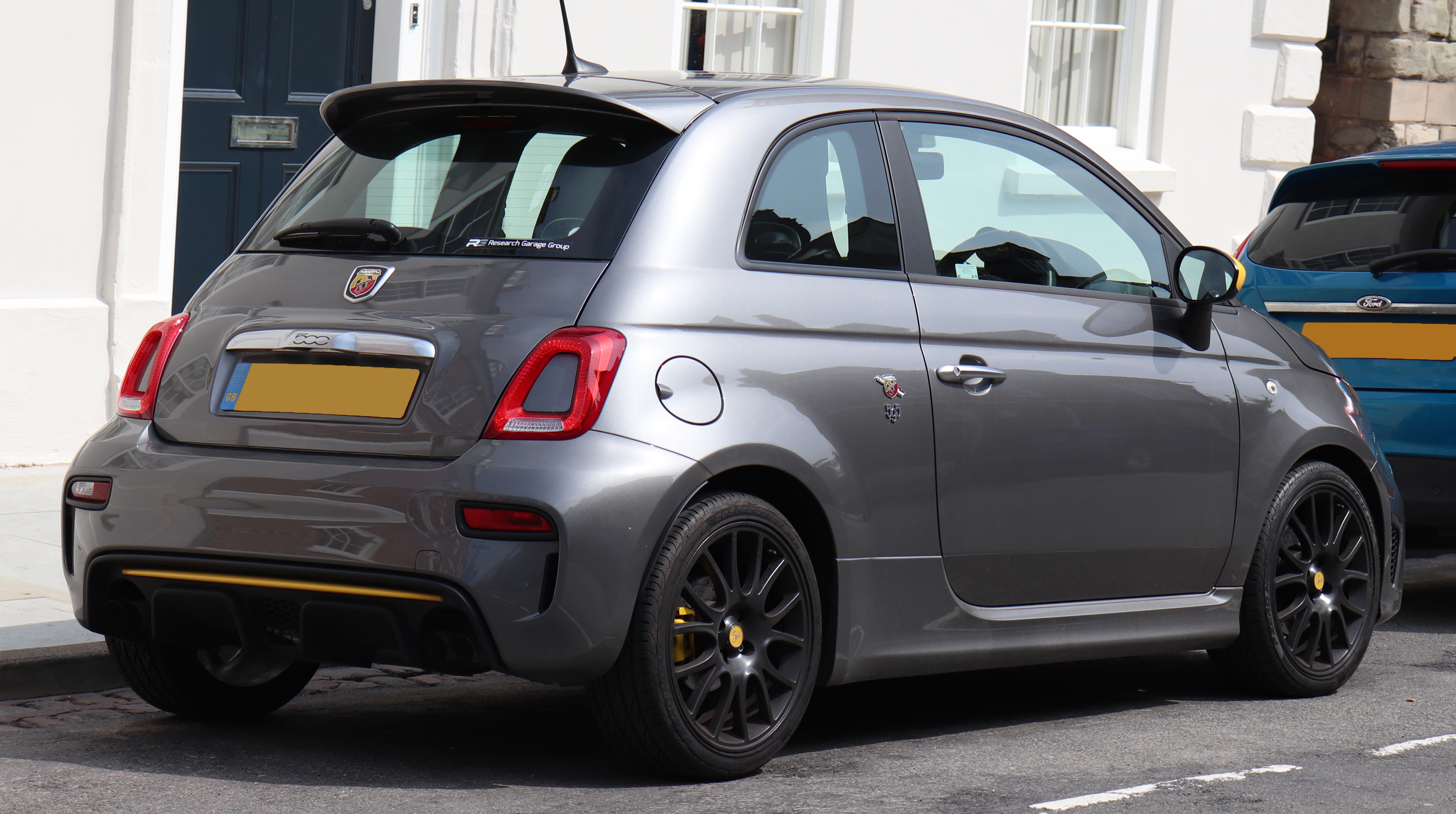
Abarth 595 Trofeo

=== Fiat 500e (2013) ===
Fiat 500e
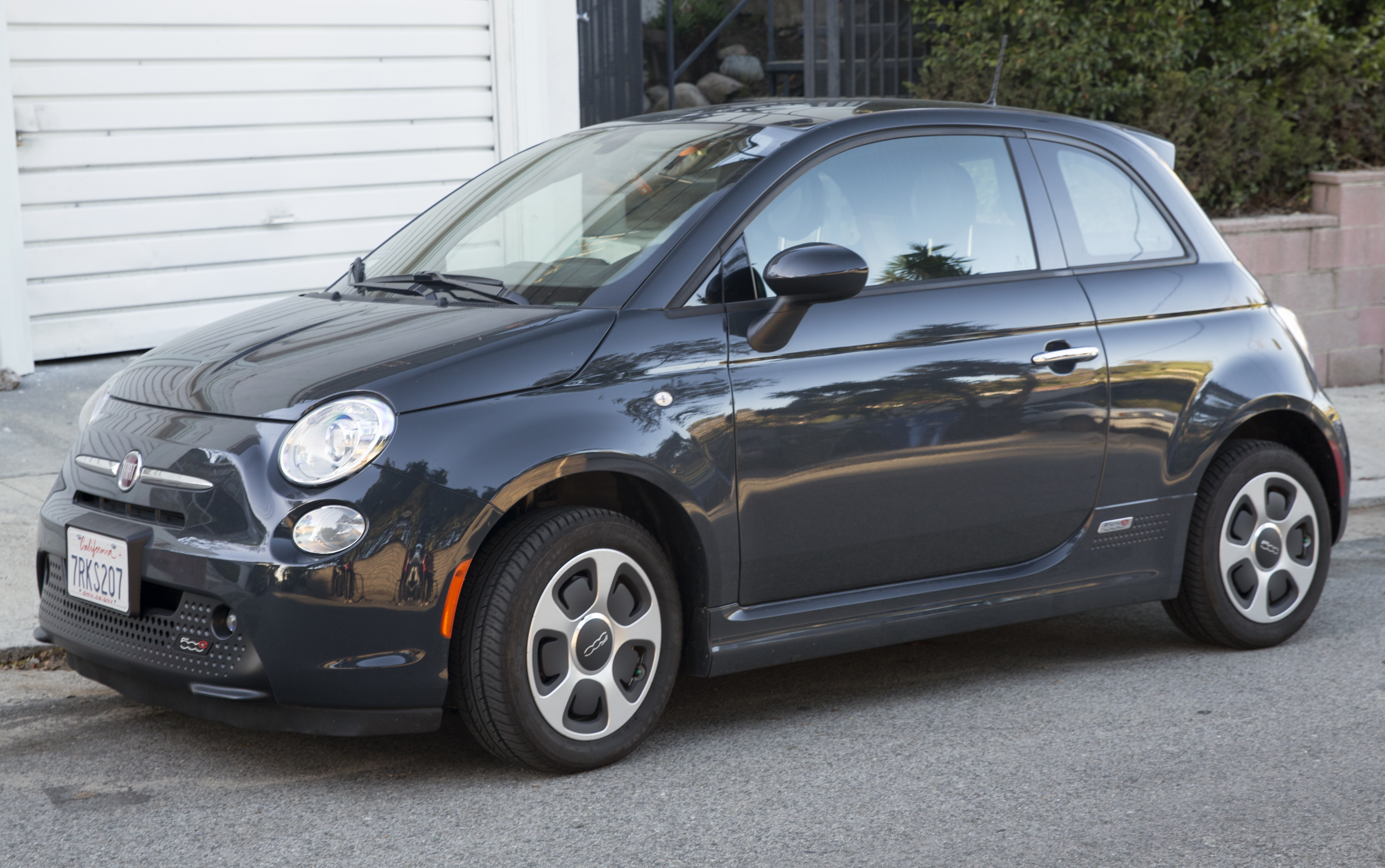

Overview
- Production: 2013–2019

Body and chassis
- Class: Battery electric vehicle
- Body style: 3-door hatchback
- Layout: Front-engine, front-wheel drive

Powertrain
- Electric motor: Bosch SMG 180/120, AC synchronous permanent-magnet motor, 111 hp (83 kW), 147 ft⋅lb (200 N⋅m)
- Transmission: single-speed reduction gear (9.59:1)
- Battery: 24 kWh lithium-ion
- Plug-in charging: SAE J1772; AC 120V 12A: 1.44 kW; AC 240V 12A: 2.8 kW; AC 240V 28A: 6.6 kW

Chronology
- Predecessor: Fiat Panda Elettra
- Successor: Fiat 500e

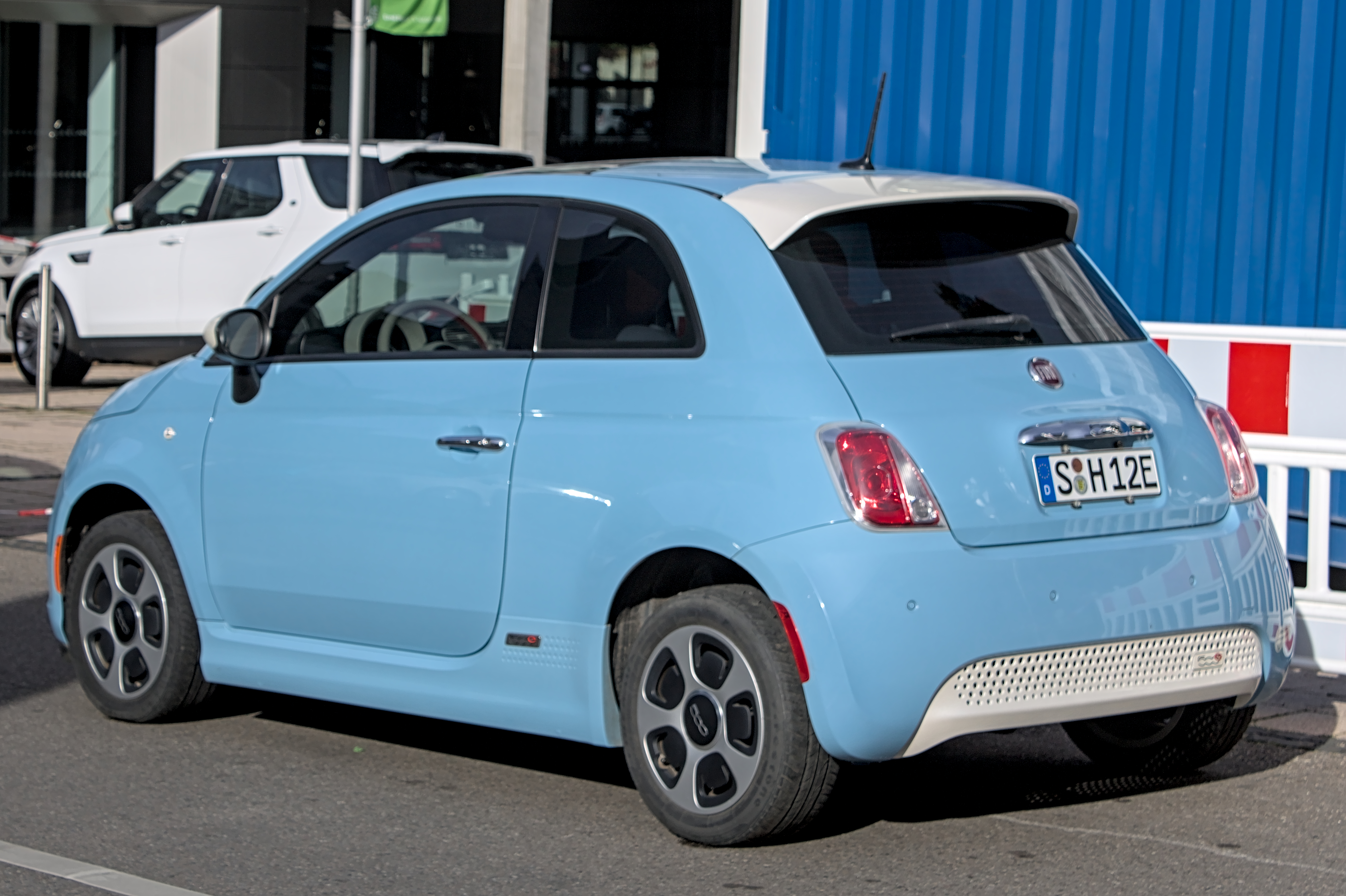
2016 Fiat 500e

A production battery-electric Fiat 500e was unveiled in November 2012 at the Los Angeles Auto Show, and sales began in the U.S. state of California in July 2013, expanding to Oregon in the summer of 2014; these sales focused on states that had political mandates for sales of zero emission vehicles. Fiat-Chrysler stated from the beginning that there were no plans to make the 500e officially available in Europe. The 500e was produced from 2013 until 2019; a second-generation electric 500 was announced in early 2020 and launched in Europe as the New Fiat 500 and later marketed as the 500e.

==== Third-party conversion and concept history ====
An EV conversion of the Fiat 500 was first shown at the London Motor Show in July 2008. The non-OEM conversion, carried out by Micro-Vett, entailed fitting a 22 kWh lithium-ion battery pack and an electric motor but retained the 5-speed transmission; it was marketed by the NICE (No Internal Combustion Engine) Car Company and was on sale for £25,000 (equivalent to £40,800 in 2025). The NICE/Micro-Vett 500 claimed a range of 75 miles (121 km) and a top speed of 60 mph (97 km/h).

An electric concept car version of the 500 by Fiat/Chrysler was shown as the 500 Elettra or 500 BEV Concept at the 2010 Detroit Auto Show in January, positioned as a competitor to the Mini E; details of the electric vehicle were not initially available. The electrified 500 appeared to be a working prototype, as it contained a traction battery and motor with a pushbutton transmission. Shortly after the 2010 show, Fiat/Chrysler announced an all-electric 500, based on the 500 Elettra concept, would go into production starting in 2012. It had a target range of 100 miles (160 km) and an estimated retail price of $32,000, half of which was attributed to the cost of the battery.

The production 500e was unveiled in November 2012 at the Los Angeles Auto Show, followed by a second appearance at the 2013 Frankfurt Motor Show.

==== Availability ====
Deliveries began in California by July 2013, and around 2,310 units were sold in the U.S. in 2013. The Fiat 500e went on sale in Oregon in the summer of 2014, and U.S. sales were limited to just these two states.

The American rollout was scheduled to continue to other states with mandates of sales of zero emission vehicles; for Europe, Fiat-Chrysler said in 2012 there were no plans to make the 500e officially available. Scuderia-E imported and sold used 500e vehicles that were originally on sale in the United States for the European market, refitted with higher-capacity batteries and a Combined Charging System combination socket for fast charging.

In September 2019, Fiat announced it was discontinuing the entire subcompact hatchback 500 line in the United States, including the 500e; existing dealer stock was expected to sustain sales into 2020.

==== Design ====
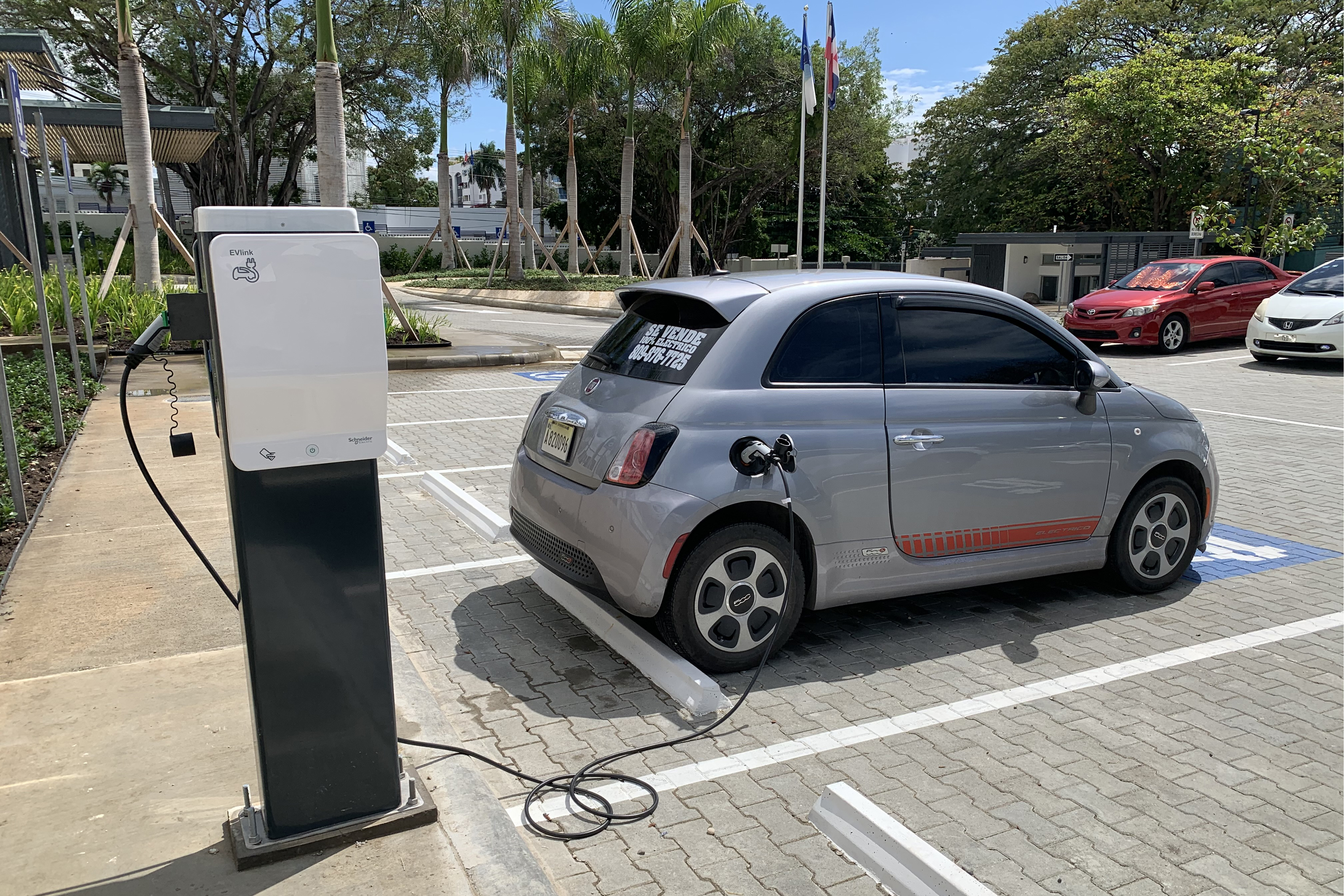
500e charging

The 500e is powered by a 111 hp (83 kW) and 147 lb⋅ft (199 N⋅m) synchronous permanent-magnet, three-phase AC electric motor, and its 24 kWh liquid-cooled/heated li-ion battery delivers a range of 80 mi (130 km), and up to 100 mi (160 km) in city driving according to Chrysler. The combination of alternating current motor, battery, and inverter has a claimed efficiency of 92%. Charging time is less than four hours when connected to a 240 V AC source using the on-board 6.6 kW charging module. Although the 500e does not come equipped with or offers as an option a DC fast charging connector, the development engineers state the car is equipped to handle charging at up to 480 V and 70 A if the appropriate connector is retrofitted to the car.

The official U.S. Environmental Protection Agency (EPA) range is 87 mi (140 km). Under its five-cycle testing, the EPA rated the 500e combined fuel economy at 116 mpg‑e (290 Wh/mi; 181 Wh/km) overall, 122 mpg‑e (280 Wh/mi; 172 Wh/km) in city driving, and 108 mpg‑e (310 Wh/mi; 194 Wh/km) on the highway. Regenerative braking is employed to extend range; under normal braking (i.e., excluding panic and emergency stops), the brake pedal engages only regenerative braking down to speeds of 8 mph (13 km/h), when the conventional mechanical brakes begin to engage.

Robert Bosch GmbH supplies all the powertrain components for the 500e, including the electric motor, power electronics, and battery. The motor, which Bosch have designated the SMG ("sequential motor-generator") 180/120, is shared with other vehicles, including the smart fortwo electric and PSA GROUP's HYbrid4. The SMG 180/120 weighs just 62 lb (28 kg) and spins at a speed up to 12,500 rpm. The inverter, designated INVCON 2.3 by Bosch, converts direct current energy stored in the traction battery to alternating current for the SMG 180/120 and weighs less than 15 lb (7 kg) in a package 12.2 in × 7.5 in × 6.1 in (310 mm × 190 mm × 156 mm) (L×W×H), including connectors. Chrysler developed and integrated the electric powertrain, and reportedly had been working on an electrified 500 even before the company was purchased by Fiat. Ward's named the 500e powertrain to its list of 10 Best Engines for 2014.

Designers and engineers of the Fiat 500e worked to minimize drag while keeping the iconic styling of the conventional powered Fiat 500. For the 500e to achieve a 0.311 coefficient of drag (C_{d}), as compared to the 2013 Fiat 500 Lounge model's 0.359 C_{d}, eight exterior refinements were developed in the wind tunnel to enable the 48 count drag reduction. The result of hours of wind-tunnel testing allowed the 500e to achieve an additional five miles of range compared to its gasoline-powered sibling. Among these changes are front fascia sealing, aerodynamically optimized front fascia design, drag-reducing rear fascia design, liftgate-mounted aerodynamic spoiler, and under-vehicle belly pans. The battery adds 600 pounds (270 kg) for a total curb weight of approximately 3,000 pounds (1,400 kg), but it is located low in the chassis behind the front seats, changing the front:rear weight balance from 64:36 (on the conventionally gas-powered 500) to 57:43 (for the 500e).

Development of the production 500e started with prototypes assembled by hand at Chrysler headquarters in Auburn Hills, Michigan; the prototypes used components from suppliers (later announced as Bosch) and were shipped to Sonoma County, California, as the initially planned market was California, for testing in the summer of 2012. The Chrysler engineering team was tasked with integrating the hardware components and tuning the finished car to behave as close to a conventionally gas-powered 500 as possible. Some of the aerodynamic refinements developed for the production 500e were intended to be back-fitted to the regular 500.

Fiat describes the 500e's unique exterior design as retro-futuristic, and the vehicle had a smartphone app that notifies the owner of the vehicle's status. Behind the steering wheel the 500e had a new 7-inch thin-film transistor (TFT) display to provide increased functionality with more intuitively delivered information of the power gauge, driving range and state of charge. In addition, a new Electronic Vehicle Information Center (EVIC) provided full-color capabilities with the use of picture graphics to illustrate vehicle functions including a trip computer, tire-pressure monitoring, and vehicle status messaging system. The available TomTom navigation pairs with the Fiat 500e's standard BLUE&ME Handsfree Communication technology and features a 4.3-inch touchscreen display mounted on top of the instrument panel.

==== Pricing ====
The Fiat 500e pricing started at US$32,500 including a US$700 destination charge and before any applicable government incentives. Leasing is available with a down payment of US$999 due at signing and US$199 per month lease for 36 months. The leasing pricing is the same as the current lease offer on a gasoline-powered Fiat 500 Pop. Sergio Marchionne reported that Fiat loses $14,000 on every 500e it sells, and only produces the cars because California rules require automobile manufacturers who sell a certain number of cars in the state to sell a percentage of that total as zero emissions vehicles.

In April 2013, Fiat North America announced that to avoid range anxiety concerns and allow customers to cover longer travel distances, each 500e purchase will include the use of rental vehicles for up to 12 days a year for free through the first three years of ownership. The program, called ePass, entitles 500e owners to a business account with enough points to rent a gasoline-powered standard car with Enterprise Holdings, which owns Enterprise Rent-A-Car, National Car Rental and Alamo Rent a Car. Fiat will deposit additional points the following two years to extend the program. The gasoline-powered cars available for the ePass program are the Fiat 500, the upcoming Fiat 500L, the Dodge Dart or the Chrysler 200. Customers will also have the option to upgrade to a larger vehicle such as a minivan or a pickup truck subject to terms of the program.

Some electric cars depreciate more rapidly than conventionally powered cars and trucks, according to NerdWallet if depreciation is calculated based on the pre-tax credit price. For all-electric cars depreciation varies between 60% and 75% in three years. In contrast, most conventionally powered vehicles in the same period depreciate between 45% and 50%. In 2016, it was reported that wholesale prices of used three-year old Fiat 500e were as low as US$5,000 (equivalent to $6,710 in 2025), and were being sold at retail for US$10,000 (equivalent to $13,420 in 2025).

==== Sales and production ====
Annual sales
Year	Sales
2013	2,310
2014	5,132
2015	6,194
2016	5,330
2017	5,380
2018	2,250
2019	615

The entire production run of 2013 models was sold out by June 2013, before the first cars were delivered to new owners. About 16,549 units have been sold in the U.S. through May 2016. Because Fiat/Chrysler does not report sales of the 500e model independently, sales figures are estimated from state rebate data.

The first-generation 500e was assembled at the Toluca Car Assembly plant in Mexico. In the wake of the failure of its planned merger with Renault in July 2019, Fiat Chrysler Automobiles announced it was investing €700 million to convert its entire Mirafiori plant to production of the second-generation 500e, hoping to produce up to 80,000 electric vehicles per year, starting in the second quarter of 2020.

==== Recalls ====
In August 2013 Chrysler issued a recall to replace bolts that secure the Fiat 500e half-drive shafts. The recall was not related to the 500e's electric powertrain and affected 291 model year 2013 Fiat 500e cars, including vehicles at dealers' lots. When an investigation was launched after a customer's 500e exhibited power loss, engineers discovered two assembly steps that had not been properly completed, thereby creating a condition that could lead to half-shaft separation. Fiat 500e owners affected by the recall were to receive free rental vehicles while their cars were repaired at no charge.

== Specifications ==
=== Engines ===
FCA launched the 500 with three Euro5-compliant engines: two petrol/gasoline and one diesel engine. The 1.3 Multijet was equipped with a diesel particulate filter (DPF). Despite the 500's name, which originally corresponded to its engine displacement, the lowest displacement is 1242 cc with 69 PS, (Note: Conversions to other units in table below.) notably larger and more powerful than both the original 500 and the Cinquecento from the 1990s.

A smaller, turbocharged two-cylinder Twinair engine with 85 PS was later unveiled at the 2010 Geneva Motor Show, entering production the following year. The TwinAir received the Best New Engine Award for 2011 and was marketed the "world's greenest petrol engine," based on official Euro test cycle data for emissions and fuel consumption.

A naturally aspirated version of the TwinAir was introduced later with larger bore and longer stroke, a displacement of 964 cc (1.0 L) and a higher compression ratio. This engine delivers 60 PS (44 kW). Availability is limited to selected markets, e.g., the Netherlands.

The 105 PS (77 kW), 0.9-litre TwinAir engine model was unveiled at the 2013 Frankfurt Motor Show.

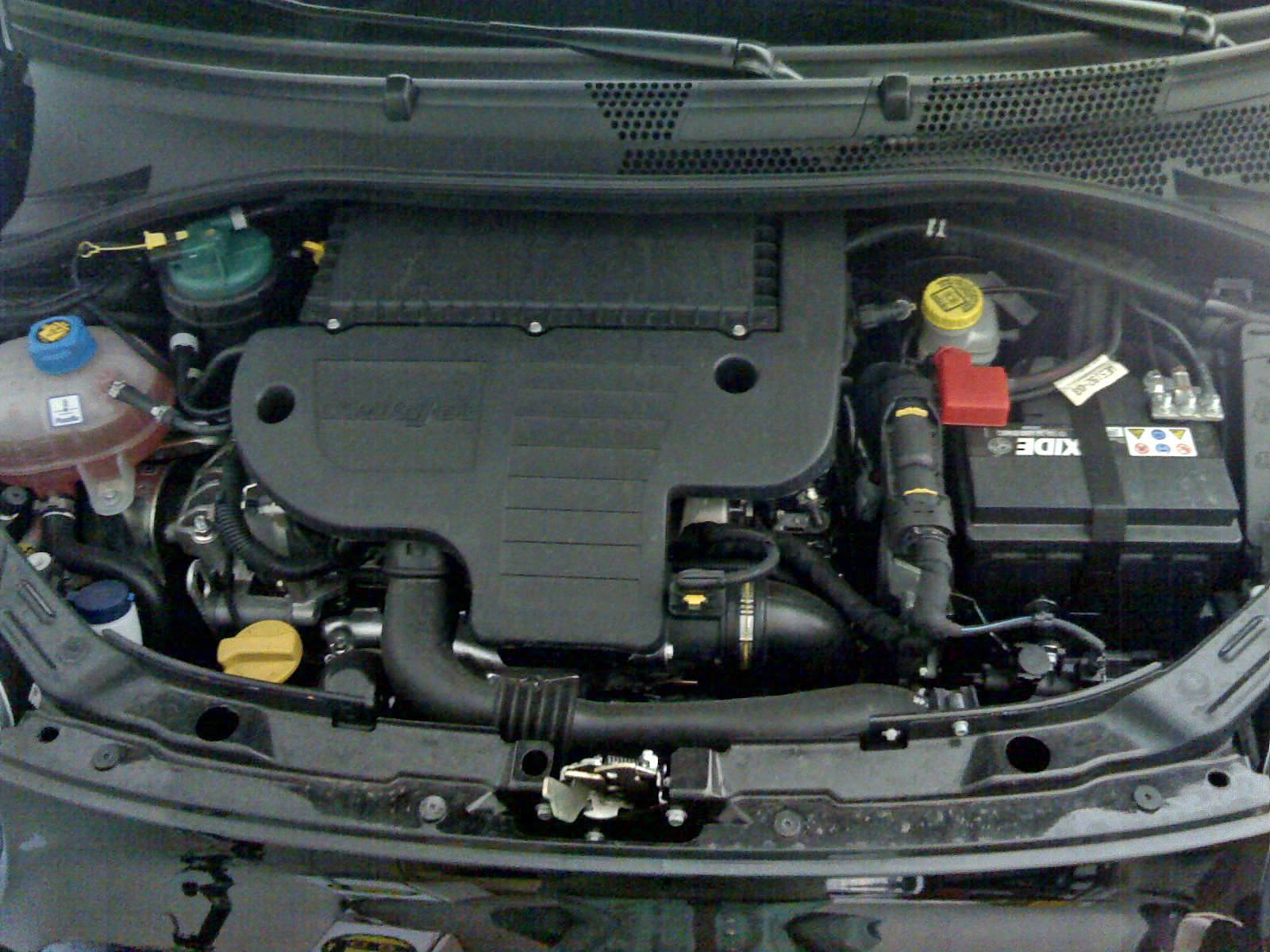
1.3 L MultiJet diesel

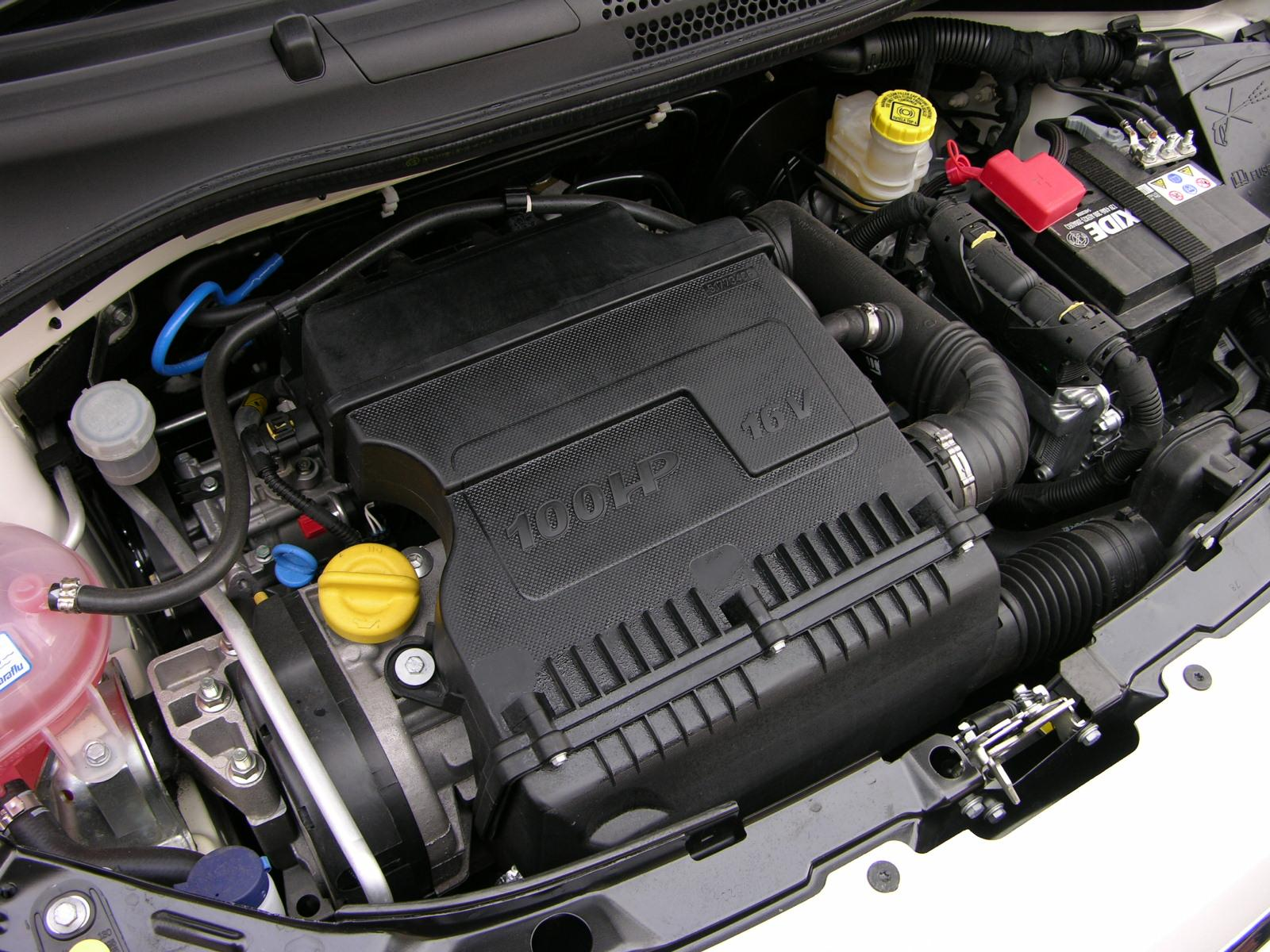
1.4 L petrol/gasoline

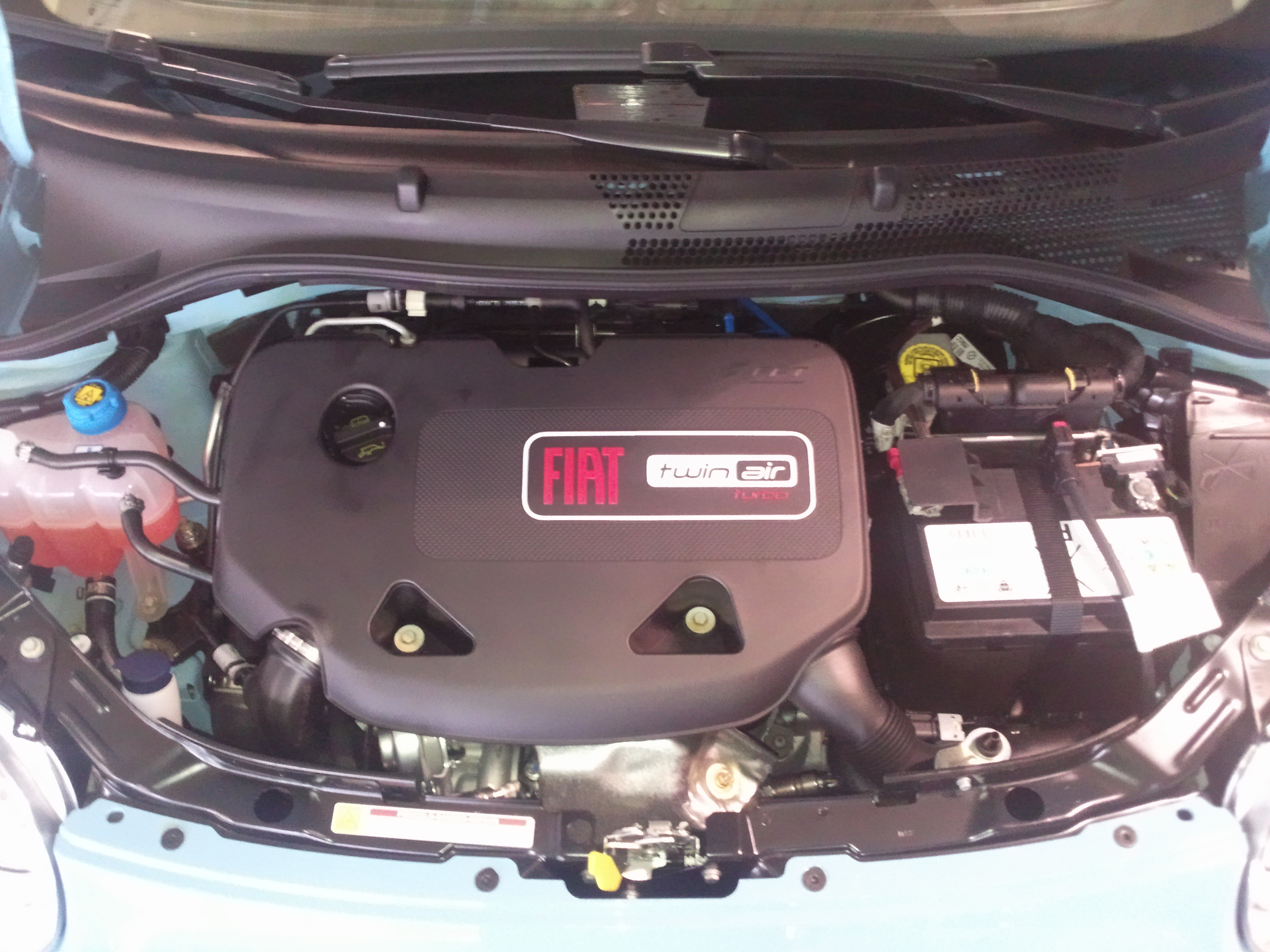
0.9 L (875 cc) TwinAir

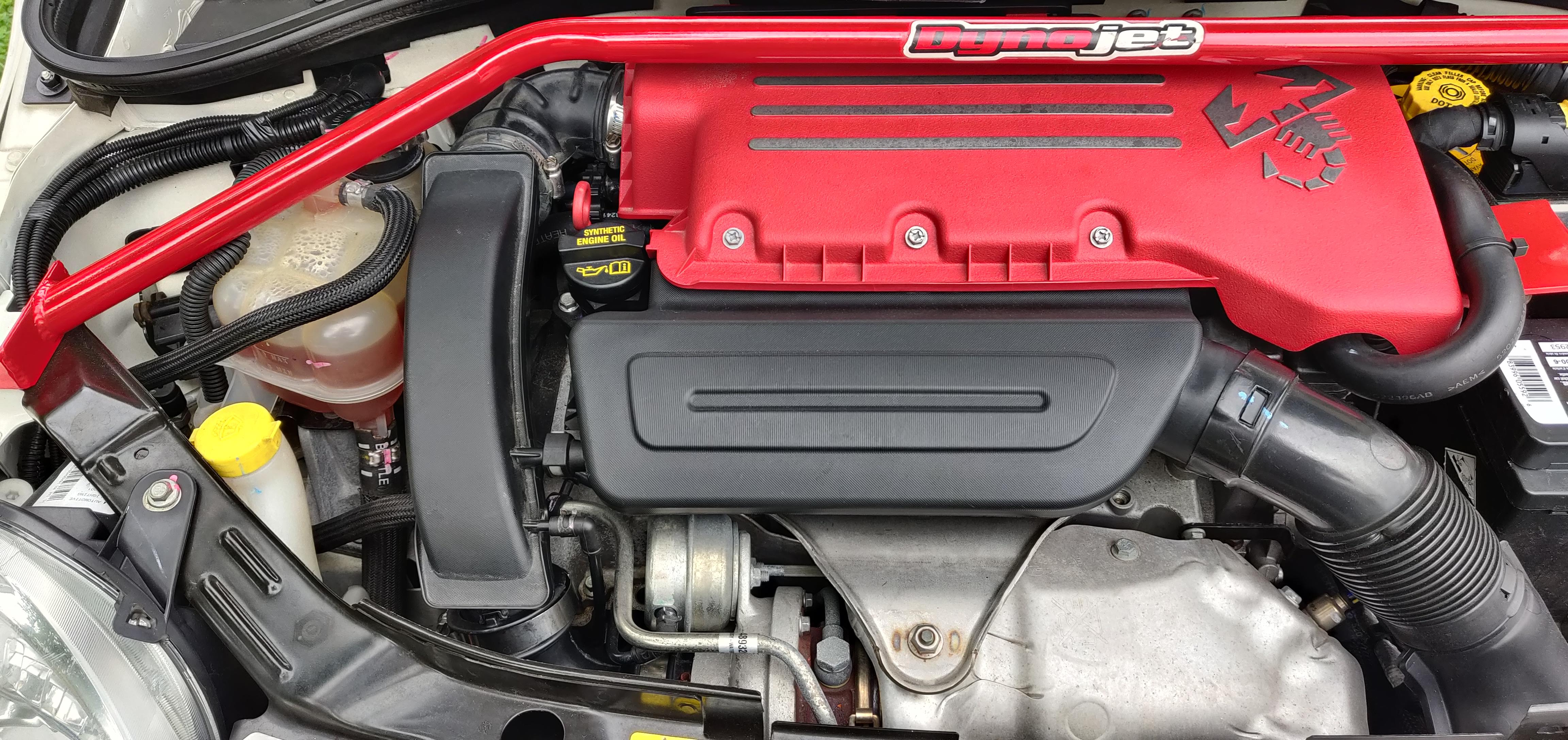
1.4L Abarth Turbo Multiair (North American)

Model	Engine type	Power at rpm	Torque at rpm	0–100 km/h (0–62 mph) (s)	Top speed	CO_{2} emission (g/km)	Notes
Petrol/gasoline engines
1.0 TwinAir 60	964 cc (1.0 L; 58.8 cu in) I2	60 PS (44 kW; 59 hp) at 6,250	88 N⋅m (65 lb⋅ft) at 3,500	15.0	159 km/h (99 mph)	88	
1.2 8v	1,242 cc (1.2 L; 75.8 cu in) I4	69 PS (51 kW; 68 hp) at 5,500	102 N⋅m (75 lb⋅ft) at 3,000	12.9	160 km/h (99 mph)	119	with Start-stop system 113 g/km
1.4 16v MultiAir 105 (North America & Brazil)	1,368 cc (1.368 L; 83.5 cu in) I4	105 PS (77 kW; 104 hp) at 6250 rpm	135 N⋅m (100 lb⋅ft) at 3850 rpm	10.5	182 km/h (113 mph)	149	
1.4 16v FIRE 100	1,368 cc (1.368 L; 83.5 cu in) I4	101 PS (74 kW; 100 hp) at 6750 rpm	131 N⋅m (97 lb⋅ft) at 4250 rpm	10.5	182 km/h (113 mph)	149	
1.4 8v Fire EVO Flex (Brazil)	1,368 cc (1.368 L; 83.5 cu in) I4	86–89 PS (63–65 kW; 85–88 hp) at 6000 rpm	115 N⋅m (85 lb⋅ft) at 3250 rpm	12.5	173 km/h (107 mph)	-	
0.9 TwinAir Turbo 85	875 cc (0.875 L; 53.4 cu in) I2 turbo	85 PS (63 kW; 84 hp) at 5,500	145 N⋅m (107 lb⋅ft) at 1,900	11.0	173 km/h (107 mph)	95	with Dualogic gearbox 92 g/km
0.9 TwinAir Turbo 105	875 cc (0.875 L; 53.4 cu in) I2 turbo	105 PS (77 kW; 104 hp) at 5,500	145 N⋅m (107 lb⋅ft) at 2,000	10	188 km/h (117 mph)	99	
Abarth Version
1.4 Turbo MultiAir (North America)	1,368 cc (1.368 L; 83.5 cu in) I4 turbo	135 hp (101 kW; 137 PS)	150 lb⋅ft (203 N⋅m)	-	-	-	Turbo (2013–2016), Pop/Lounge (2018–)
1.4 Abarth	1,368 cc (1.368 L; 83.5 cu in) I4 turbo	135 PS (99 kW; 133 hp) at 5,500	180 N⋅m (133 lb⋅ft) normal, 206 N⋅m (152 lb⋅ft) sport at 3,000	7.9	205 km/h (127 mph)	155	
1.4 Abarth Esseesse, Abarth 595	1,368 cc (1.368 L; 83.5 cu in) I4 turbo	160 PS (118 kW; 158 hp) at 5,750	206 N⋅m (152 lb⋅ft) normal, 230 N⋅m (170 lb⋅ft) sport at 3,000	7.4	211 km/h (131 mph)	155	
1.4 Abarth F595	1,368 cc (1.368 L; 83.5 cu in) I4 turbo	167 PS (123 kW; 165 hp)	230 N⋅m (170 lb⋅ft) at 2,250	7.3 (Manual); 7.4 (AMT)	217 km/h (135 mph)	-	50th anniversary model
1.4 Abarth (North America with manual transmission)	1,368 cc (1.368 L; 83.5 cu in) I4 turbo	162 PS (119 kW; 160 hp) at 5,500	230 N⋅m (170 lb⋅ft) at 2,500–4,000	6.6	204 km/h (127 mph)	-	Sold from 2012 to 2019
1.4 Abarth (North America with automatic transmission)	1,368 cc (1.368 L; 83.5 cu in) I4 turbo	159 PS (117 kW; 157 hp) at 5,500	248 N⋅m (183 lb⋅ft) at 2,500–4,000	-	-	-	Sold from 2015 to 2019
1.4 Abarth Assetto Corse	1,368 cc (1.368 L; 83.5 cu in) I4 turbo	200 PS (147 kW; 197 hp) at 6,500	300 N⋅m (220 lb⋅ft) at 3,000	-	-	-	
Diesel engines
1.3 16v Multijet	1,248 cc (1.248 L; 76.2 cu in) I4 turbo	75 PS (55 kW; 74 hp) at 4,000	145 N⋅m (107 lb⋅ft) at 1,500	12.5	165 km/h (103 mph)	110	
1.3 16v Multijet II	1,248 cc (1.248 L; 76.2 cu in) I4 turbo	95 PS (70 kW; 94 hp) at 4,000	200 N⋅m (148 lb⋅ft) at 1,500	10.7	180 km/h (112 mph)	104	from 2010
MHEV engines
1.0 FireFly	999 cc (0.999 L; 61.0 cu in) straight-3, petrol-electric mild-hybrid	70.02 PS (51.50 kW; 69.06 hp) at 6,000	92 N⋅m (68 lb⋅ft) at 3,500	13,8	167 km/h (103,76 mph)	105	from 2020

=== Fuel consumption (EC 1999/100) ===
Model	City	Highway	Combined
TwinAir 60	4.6 L/100 km (61 mpg_{‑imp}; 51 mpg_{‑US})	3.4 L/100 km (83 mpg_{‑imp}; 69 mpg_{‑US})	3.8 L/100 km (74 mpg_{‑imp}; 62 mpg_{‑US})
0.9 TwinAir Turbo Start&Stop 0.9 TwinAir Turbo (Dualogic, Start&Stop)	4.9 L/100 km (58 mpg_{‑imp}; 48 mpg_{‑US}) (4.6 L/100 km (61 mpg_{‑imp}; 51 mpg_{‑US}))	3.7 L/100 km (76 mpg_{‑imp}; 64 mpg_{‑US}); 3.6 L/100 km (78 mpg_{‑imp}; 65 mpg_{‑US})	4.1 L/100 km (69 mpg_{‑imp}; 57 mpg_{‑US}) (4.0 L/100 km (71 mpg_{‑imp}; 59 mpg_{‑US}))
1.2 8v (Dualogic)	6.4 L/100 km (44 mpg_{‑imp}; 37 mpg_{‑US}) (6.2 L/100 km (46 mpg_{‑imp}; 38 mpg_{‑US}))	4.3 L/100 km (66 mpg_{‑imp}; 55 mpg_{‑US})	5.1 L/100 km (55 mpg_{‑imp}; 46 mpg_{‑US}) (5.0 L/100 km (56 mpg_{‑imp}; 47 mpg_{‑US}))
1.2 8v PUR-O2	5.7 L/100 km (50 mpg_{‑imp}; 41 mpg_{‑US})	4.3 L/100 km (66 mpg_{‑imp}; 55 mpg_{‑US})	4.8 L/100 km (59 mpg_{‑imp}; 49 mpg_{‑US})
1.4 16v (Dualogic)	8.2 L/100 km (34 mpg_{‑imp}; 29 mpg_{‑US}) (7.3 L/100 km (39 mpg_{‑imp}; 32 mpg_{‑US}))	5.2 L/100 km (54 mpg_{‑imp}; 45 mpg_{‑US})	6.3 L/100 km (45 mpg_{‑imp}; 37 mpg_{‑US}) (6.0 L/100 km (47 mpg_{‑imp}; 39 mpg_{‑US}))
1.3 Multijet diesel 16v DPF	5.3 L/100 km (53 mpg_{‑imp}; 44 mpg_{‑US})	3.6 L/100 km (78 mpg_{‑imp}; 65 mpg_{‑US})	4.2 L/100 km (67 mpg_{‑imp}; 56 mpg_{‑US})
1.3 Multijet II diesel 16v DPF	5.0 L/100 km (56 mpg_{‑imp}; 47 mpg_{‑US})	3.3 L/100 km (86 mpg_{‑imp}; 71 mpg_{‑US})	3.9 L/100 km (72 mpg_{‑imp}; 60 mpg_{‑US})

=== Fuel consumption (EPA) ===
Years	Transmission	Model	City	Highway	Combined
2012	5-speed manual	1.4 L Multiair	30 mpg_{‑US} (7.8 L/100 km; 36 mpg_{‑imp})	38 mpg_{‑US} (6.2 L/100 km; 46 mpg_{‑imp})	33 mpg_{‑US} (7.1 L/100 km; 40 mpg_{‑imp})
2012	5-speed manual	Abarth	28 mpg_{‑US} (8.4 L/100 km; 34 mpg_{‑imp})	34 mpg_{‑US} (6.9 L/100 km; 41 mpg_{‑imp})	31 mpg_{‑US} (7.6 L/100 km; 37 mpg_{‑imp})
2012	6-speed automatic	1.4 L Multiair	27 mpg_{‑US} (8.7 L/100 km; 32 mpg_{‑imp})	34 mpg_{‑US} (6.9 L/100 km; 41 mpg_{‑imp})	30 mpg_{‑US} (7.8 L/100 km; 36 mpg_{‑imp})
2012	6-speed automatic	Cabrio	27 mpg_{‑US} (8.7 L/100 km; 32 mpg_{‑imp})	32 mpg_{‑US} (7.4 L/100 km; 38 mpg_{‑imp})	29 mpg_{‑US} (8.1 L/100 km; 35 mpg_{‑imp})
2013	5-speed manual	1.4 L Multiair	31 mpg_{‑US} (7.6 L/100 km; 37 mpg_{‑imp})	40 mpg_{‑US} (5.9 L/100 km; 48 mpg_{‑imp})	34 mpg_{‑US} (6.9 L/100 km; 41 mpg_{‑imp})
2013	5-speed manual	1.4 L Multiair Turbo	28 mpg_{‑US} (8.4 L/100 km; 34 mpg_{‑imp})	34 mpg_{‑US} (6.9 L/100 km; 41 mpg_{‑imp})	31 mpg_{‑US} (7.6 L/100 km; 37 mpg_{‑imp})
2013	5-speed manual	Abarth	28 mpg_{‑US} (8.4 L/100 km; 34 mpg_{‑imp})	34 mpg_{‑US} (6.9 L/100 km; 41 mpg_{‑imp})	31 mpg_{‑US} (7.6 L/100 km; 37 mpg_{‑imp})
2013	6-speed automatic	1.4 L Multiair	27 mpg_{‑US} (8.7 L/100 km; 32 mpg_{‑imp})	34 mpg_{‑US} (6.9 L/100 km; 41 mpg_{‑imp})	30 mpg_{‑US} (7.8 L/100 km; 36 mpg_{‑imp})

=== Safety ===
The new 500 has seven airbags in all models and available ABS brakes, ESP (electronic stability program), ASR (antislip regulation), HBA (hydraulic brake assistance) and hill holder.

Rear disc brakes are optional.

The car was named "Worst Car For Passenger Injuries" in a study by a US-based insurance group analysed rates for Personal Injury Protection (PIP) and Medical Payments (MedPay) policies, which cover payouts to injured passengers.

==== ANCAP ====
ANCAP test results* Fiat 500 Pop 3 door hatch without ESC (2008)
Test	Score
Overall	4 /5 stars
Frontal offset	15.11/16
Side impact	15.80/16
Pole	2/2
Seat belt reminders	2/3
Whiplash protection	Not Assessed
Pedestrian protection	Marginal
Electronic stability control	Not Available

ANCAP test results* Fiat 500 Pop 3 door hatch ESC (2008)
Test	Score
Overall	5 /5 stars
Frontal offset	15.11/16
Side impact	15.80/16
Pole	2/2
Seat belt reminders	2/3
Whiplash protection	Not Assessed
Pedestrian protection	Marginal
Electronic stability control	Standard

==== Euro NCAP ====
The 500 was awarded five stars by EuroNCAP, succeeding the BMW MINI as the shortest car to have a five-star rating. Fiat also said that the 500 was engineered so that it would have achieved a six-star rating had EuroNCAP adopted this classification.

The Fiat 500 passed the Euro NCAP car safety tests in 2008 with the following ratings:

Euro NCAP test results* Fiat 500 (2008)
Test	Score	Rating
Adult occupant:	35	5 /5 stars
Child occupant:	28	3 /5 stars
Pedestrian:	14	2 /4 stars

In 2017, it scored 3 stars:

Euro NCAP test results* Fiat 500 (2017)
Test	Points	%
Overall:	3 /5 stars	
Adult occupant:	25.1	66%
Child occupant:	24.4	49%
Pedestrian:	22.5	53%
Safety assist:	3.2	27%

==== IIHS ====
The Fiat 500 also scored "Poor" in small overlap crash testing by the IIHS The 2012 and 2013 models earned the Top Safety Pick award.

2012–2019 Fiat 500 on IIHS:
Category	Rating
Small overlap frontal offset (Driver)	Poor^{1}
Moderate overlap frontal offset	Good
Side impact (original test)	Good
Roof strength	Good^{2}
Head restraints and seats	Good

^{1} vehicle structure rated "Poor"
^{2} strength-to-weight ratio: 6.16

==== NHTSA ====
2016 Fiat 500 on NHTSA
Overall:	4/5 stars
Frontal Driver:	4/5 stars
Frontal Passenger:	3/5 stars
Side Driver:	5/5 stars
Side Passenger:	5/5 stars
Side Pole Driver:	3/5 stars
Rollover :	14.7%

The side impact safety of the 500 has improved in newer models :
Click <> to sort by other parameters.

Year (Note: Model Year of car crash-tested, not year of Overall Rating. Older crash tests usually carry over to newer car models.)	Manufacturer	Model	Type	Number produced (Note: Number of cars produced of this model.)	Impactor (MDB) into Vehicle (Note: Also known as Moving Deformable Barrier.)		Vehicle into pole			Comment (Note: Head Injury Criteria (HIC38) has a threshold of 1000.)
Year	Manufacturer	Model	Type	Number produced	Maximum Crush (Note: Largest deformation of vehicle part after impact.)	Rating (Note: Side Barrier Rating, combines front and rear seats.)	Maximum Crush	RLSA (Note: RLSA=Resultant Lower Spine Acceleration, measured in g-force. Threshold is 82g.)	Rating	Comment
2013	Fiat	500	Supermini	1+ million	164 mm	5/5 stars	354 mm	54 g	3/5 stars	HIC=166/382 for MDB. Pelvic force and pax RLSA within threshold. HIC=224 for pole.
2012	Fiat	500	Supermini	1+ million	133 mm	3/5 stars	354 mm	54 g	3/5 stars	HIC=165/417 for MDB. Pelvic force and pax RLSA over threshold. HIC=224 for pole.
2012	Fiat	500	Supermini	1+ million	160 mm	3/5 stars	354 mm	54 g	3/5 stars	HIC=127/410 for MDB. Pax pelvic force over threshold, and RLSA near. HIC=224 for pole.

==== Security ====
The Fiat 500 has remote locking and an immobiliser as standard. The Fiat 500 was tested by Thatcham's New Vehicle Security Ratings (NVSR) organisation and achieved the following ratings:

NVSR	Rating
Theft of car:	2/5 stars
Theft from car:	1/5 stars

== Special editions ==
=== 500 Start&Stop ===
The 500 Start&Stop is a model based on the 1.2 Lounge, with the start-stop system, designed and supplied by Bosch and Fiat Powertrain Technologies, stops the engine automatically whenever traffic conditions bring the car to a complete stop and restart it when the driver wants to move off again. The car reduces fuel consumption by up to 12% over a regular 1.2 Lounge in urban driving, with 113g/km CO_{2} emission. Other standard features include hands-free telecommunications and entertainment systems. It costs £11,300 in the UK.

==== 500 PUR-O2 (2008–) ====
The 500 PUR-O2 is based on the Fiat 500 Start&Stop, but also includes an Eco-Drive system. Beginning in January 2009, a Dualogic transmission option is also available. The vehicle was unveiled in the 2008 Paris Motor Show.

=== 500 by Diesel (2008–2009) ===
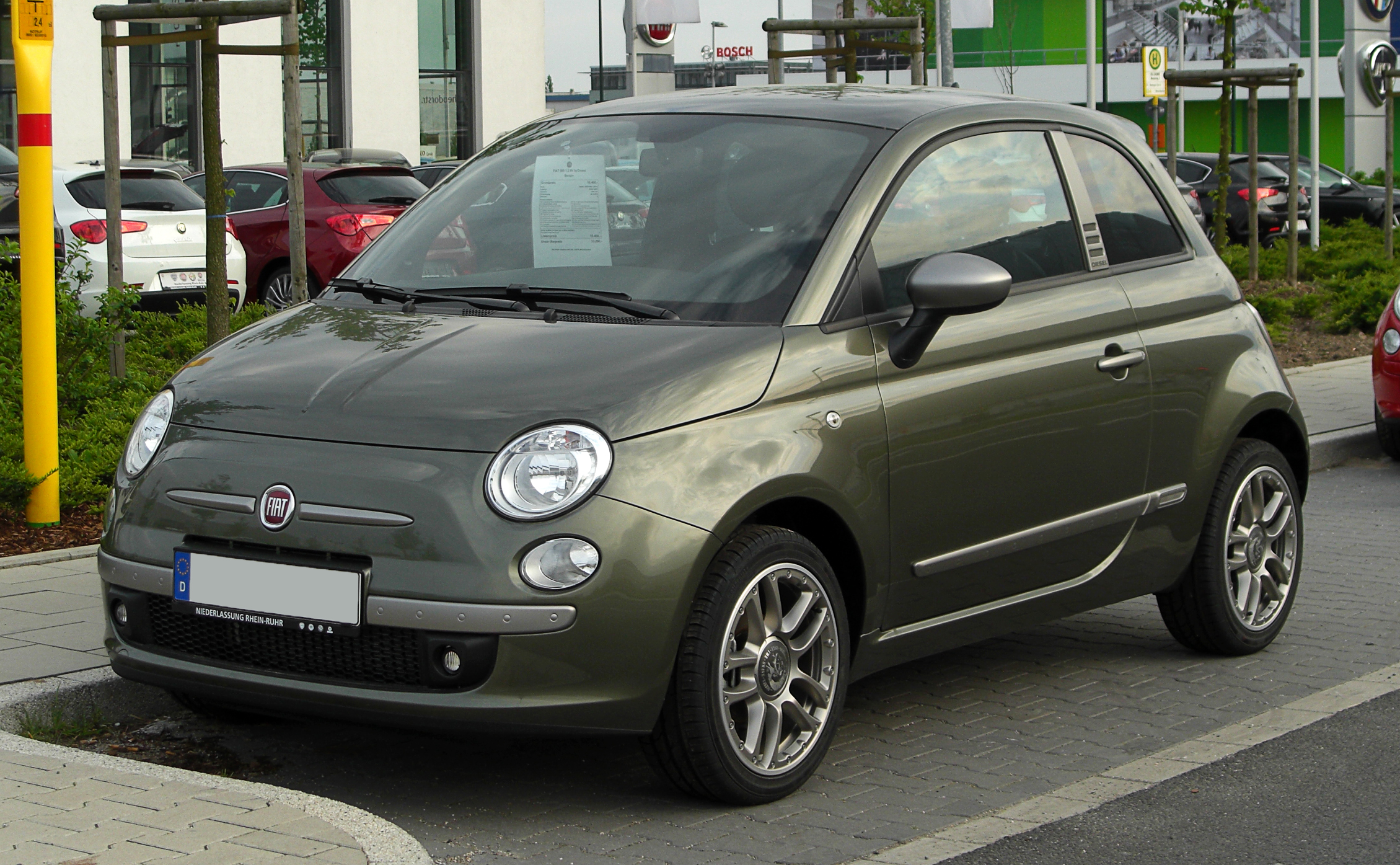
Fiat 500 by Diesel

In 2008, Fiat launched a special edition 'By Diesel' 500. In a partnership with Fiat and Italian clothing brand Diesel, with a production run of 10,000 planned. The 500 by Diesel is available in a choice of three exclusive colours, and can be distinguished from standard 500s by unique alloy wheels, 'Diesel' logos and burnished metal bumper and side-rub inserts. The interior features denim upholstery with coloured stitching and a 'Diesel' branded gear knob. The 500 by Diesel is based on the 500 Sport, using the same 1.2 L petrol, 1.4 L petrol and 1.3 L diesel engines.

==== 500 Aria (2008) ====
The 500 Aria is a concept car based on the 1.3 L Diesel vehicle, but with diesel particulate filter, Stop & Start system, Dualogic transmission, recycled rubber floor from used tires, recycled and woven leather upholstery (mataleather) by Matamata, Ecolabel polyester fabrics by Apollo company. The vehicle was unveiled in the 2008 Geneva Motor Show.

=== Ferrari edition (2008) ===
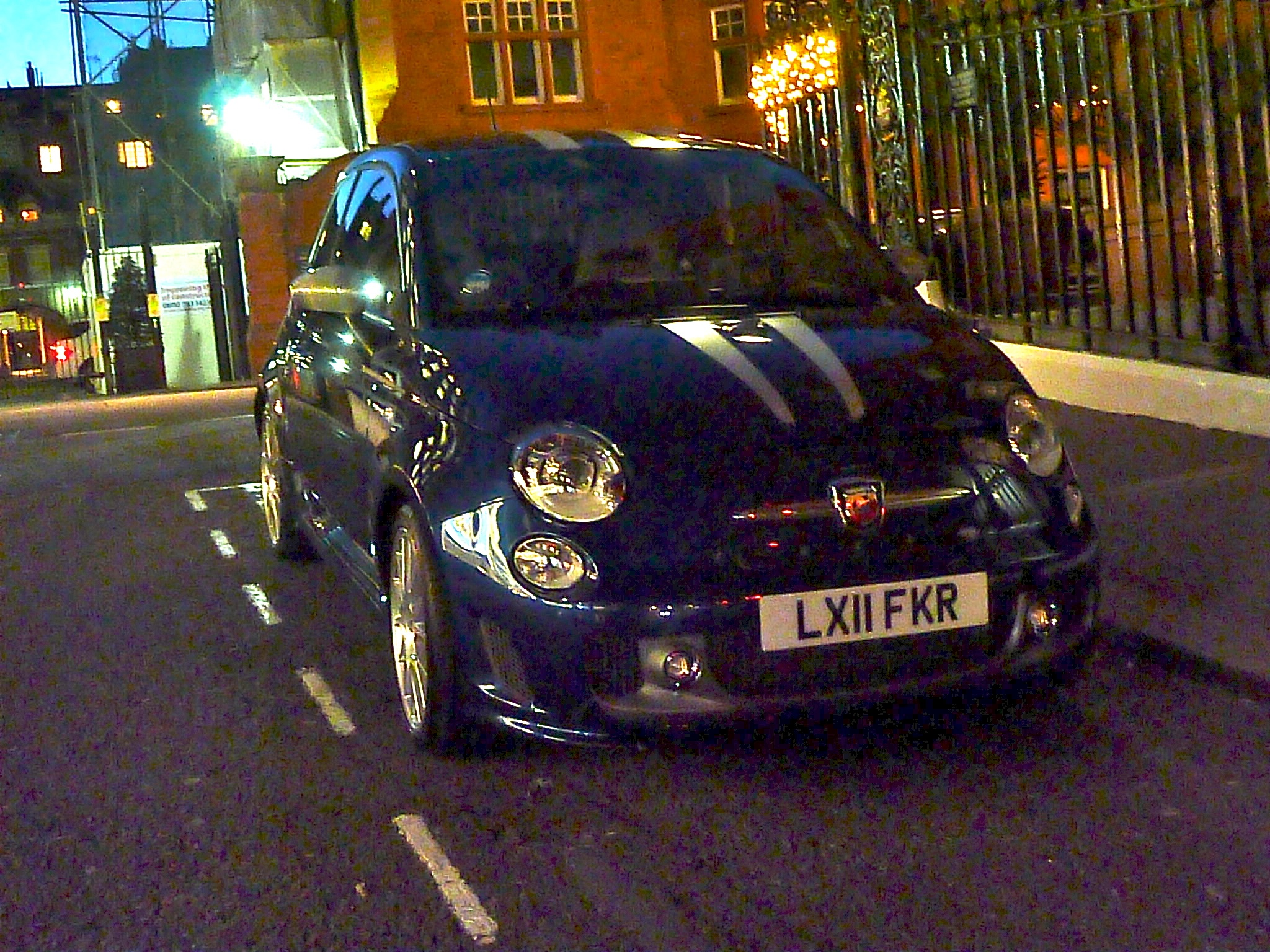
Fiat 500 Ferrari Edition

The Fiat 500 Ferrari edition is a limited-edition model (200 units) of the 1.4 (100 bhp) Sport, mainly used by Ferrari dealers as courtesy cars for owners to use while their Ferraris are being serviced. It includes a red body color, aluminum pedals, red brake calipers, 16-inch wheels with 195/45 tires, sporty steering wheel and a few tuning and exhaust modifications. Sixty of the Ferrari edition cars were shipped to the UK.

=== Felipe Massa version (2008) ===
The Felipe Massa version is a customized 1.4 Sport presented to Formula 1 driver Felipe Massa. It includes a 1.4 L engine rated at 120 PS (88 kW; 118 hp), Pearl White body color, brown Cordura interior trim, a Skydome electric sunroof, 16 inch alloy wheels with diamond alloy finish and red brake callipers. The vehicle was unveiled in Monte Carlo (Monaco).

=== Barbie version (2009) ===
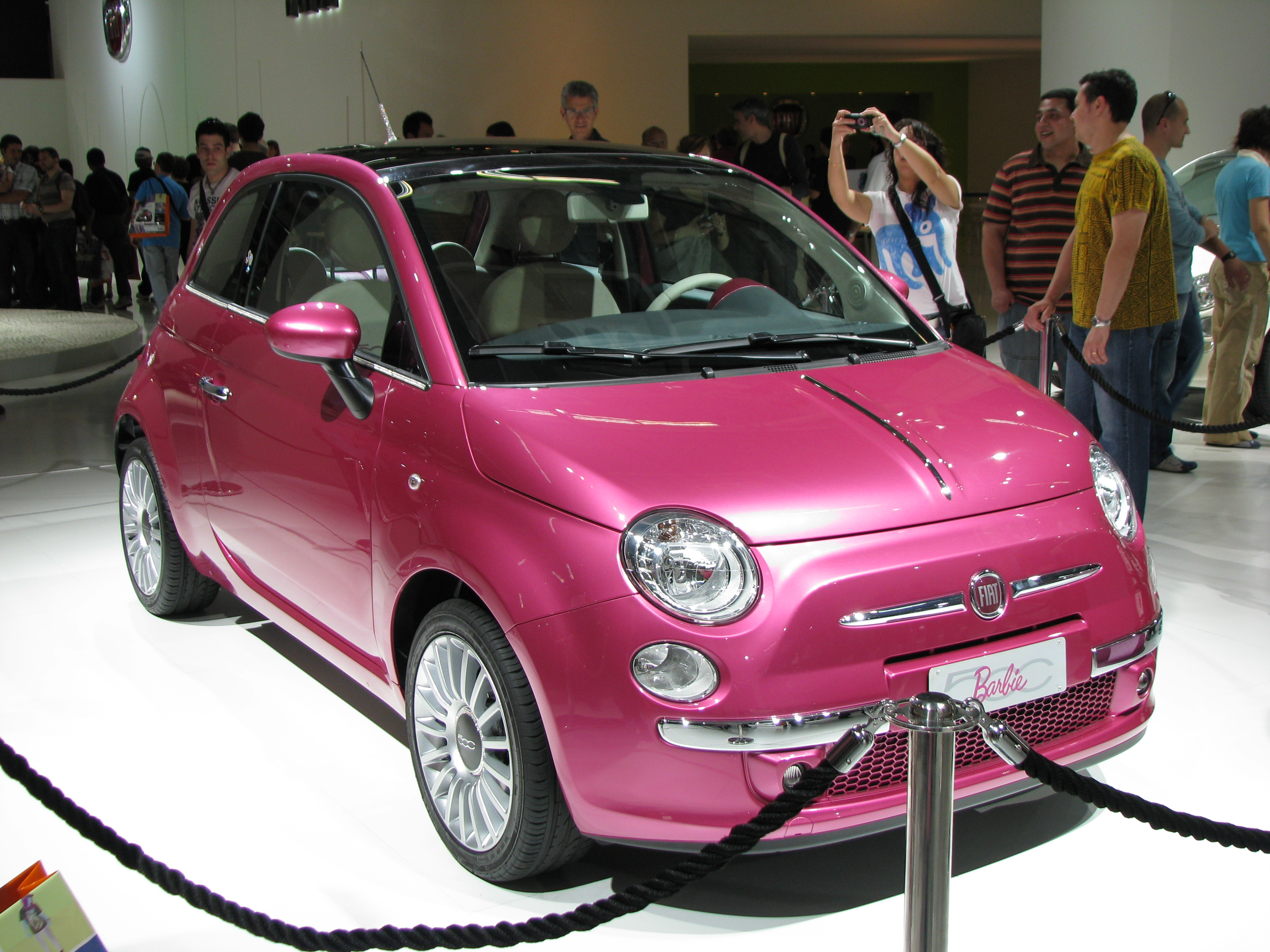
Fiat Barbie 500 at 2009 Barcelona motorshow

A special edition of the 500 designed to commemorate the 50th anniversary of the toy icon Barbie. Created by Centro Stile Fiat and Mattel, the car was unveiled on March 9, 2009, in Milan's fashion district, and parked at the entrance to La Rinascente department store, in Piazza Duomo, where German singer Nena performed live in the background. The 500 Barbie Edition will also be making an appearance at Fiat UK's flagship store at Marylebone in London.

=== Pink (2010) ===
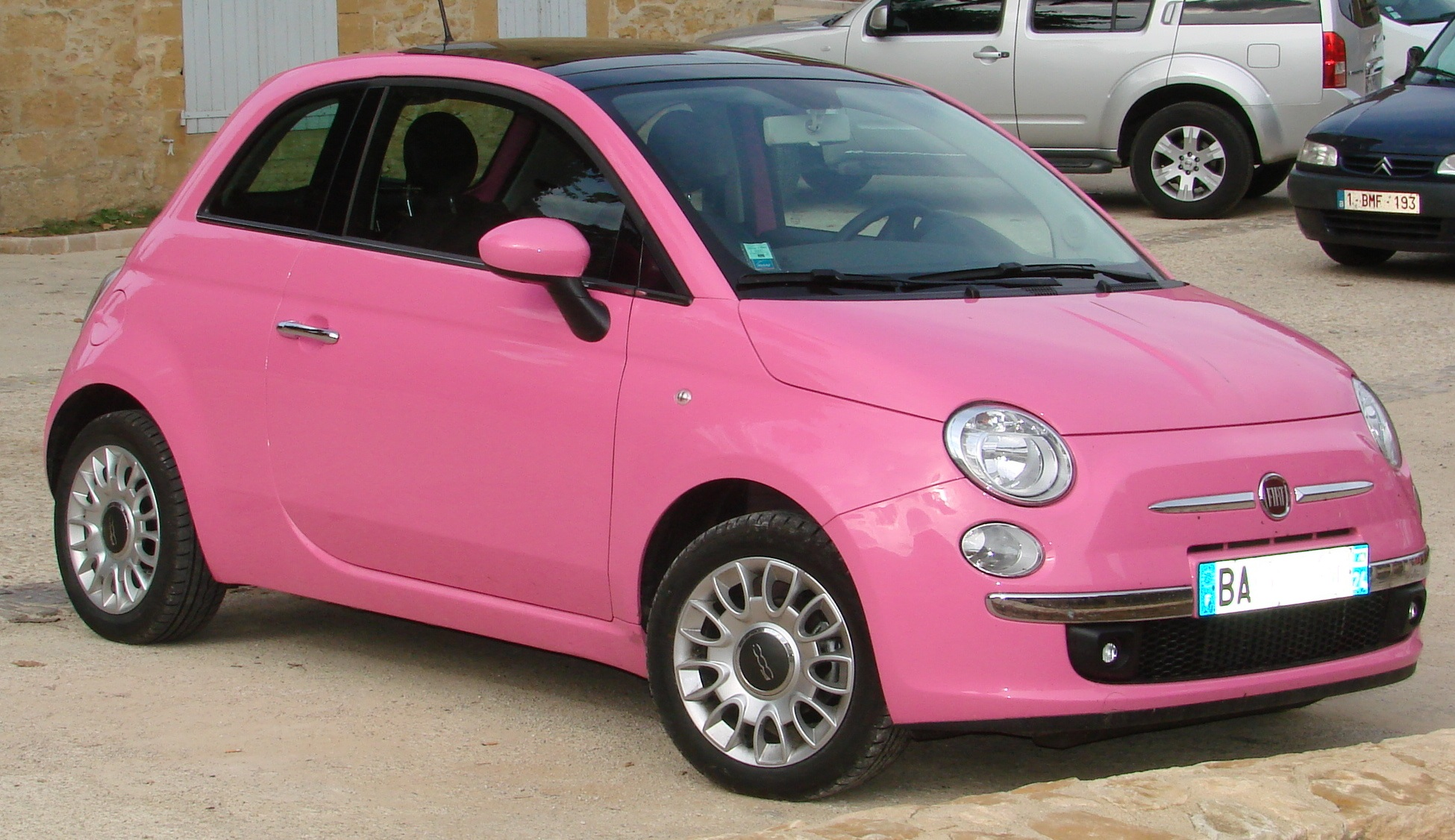
Fiat 500 Pink Edition

A limited edition 500, featured in pink, based on the 1.2 Lounge.

=== BlackJack (2010) ===
A limited-edition 500 in a special Satin Black paint. It is the first vehicle in the small car segment to feature this unique paint finish. Other special features include:

- Mouldings, door handles, door mirrors and plate holder in metallic effect
- 16-inch alloy wheels in matte black with red coach line
- Red brake calipers (1.4 only)
- Special carpet mats

=== 500 by Gucci (2011–) ===
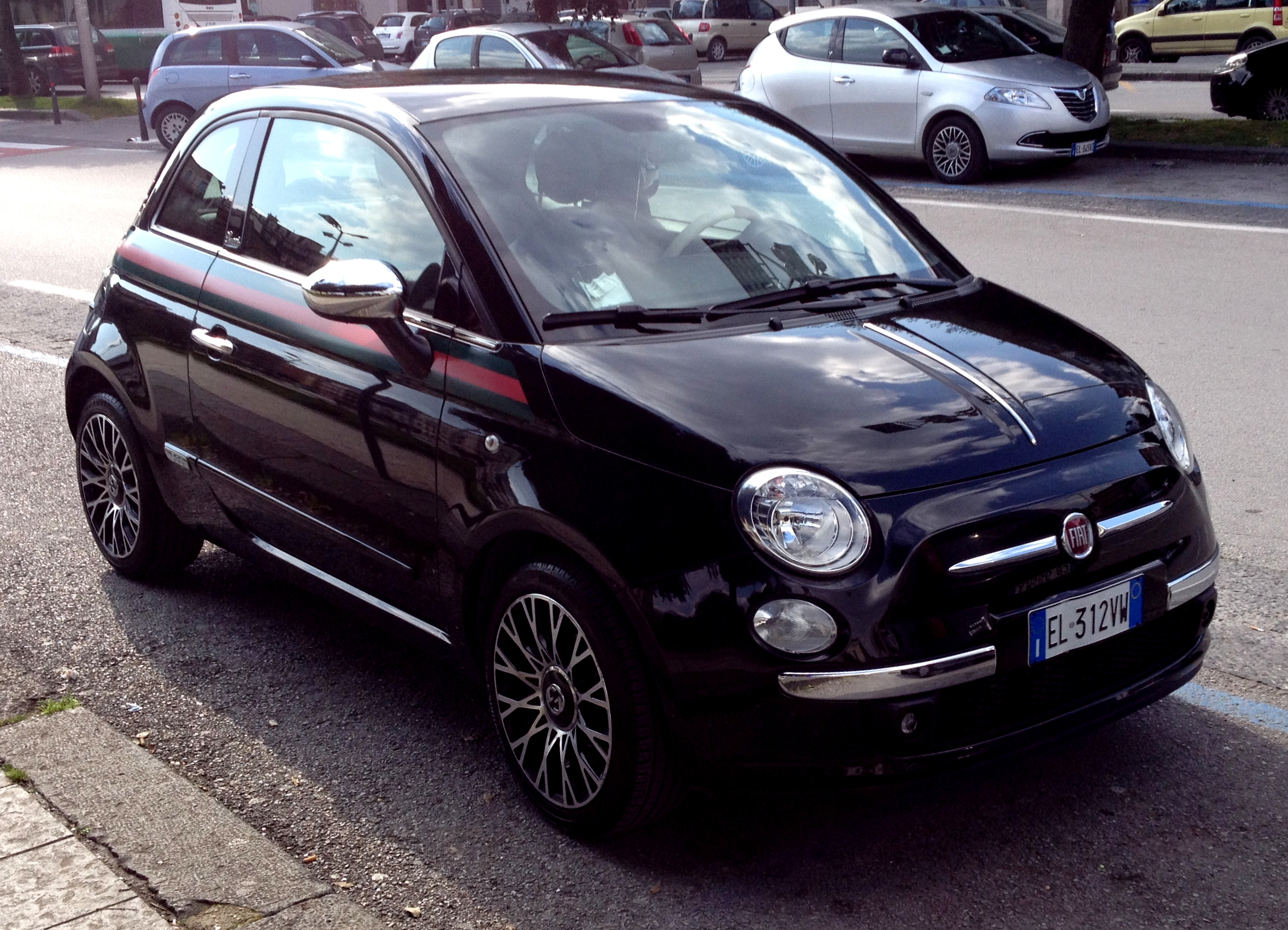
Fiat 500 by Gucci

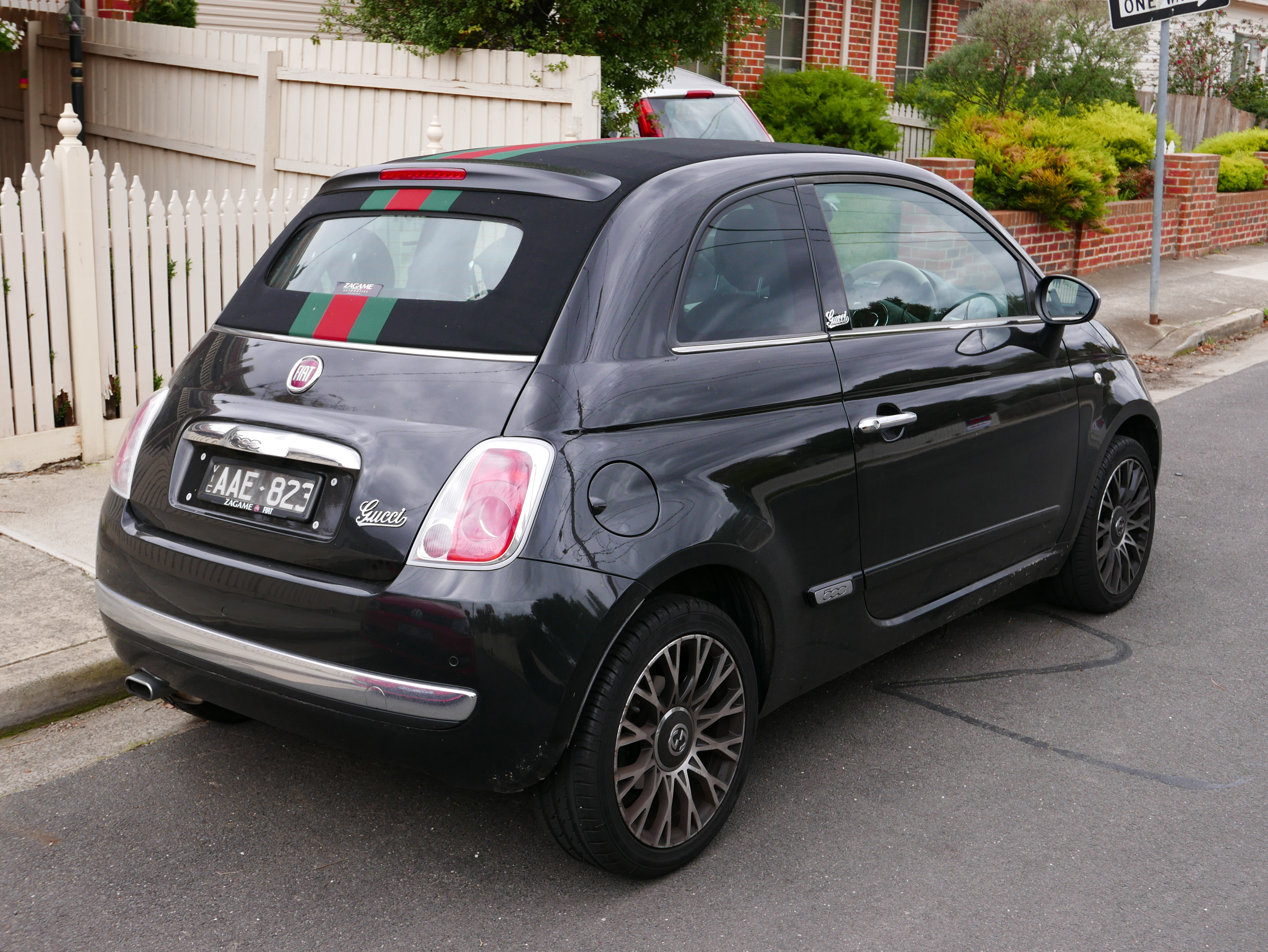
Fiat 500c by Gucci

The Fiat 500 by Gucci was a version of the Fiat 500 celebrating 150 years since the unification of Italy and Gucci's 90th anniversary. Customized by Gucci Creative Director Frida Giannini in partnership with Fiat's Centro Stile, it included a choice of 2 body colours (black or white), custom wheels for 195/45 R16 tires, and a red and green stripe around the car. The black version has detailing in metallic chrome with a sharp black and white interior for a contemporary and sporty feel, whilst the white version has satin chrome detailing with an ivory and black interior creating a softer look. Versions with the 1.4-litre engine include rear brake calipers in Gucci green.

There is a cabriolet version of the Gucci, called 500C by Gucci. It included a choice of two body colours (white with matte chrome-plated elements or gloss black with shiny chrome-plated accents), a black soft top with green-red-green Gucci web pattern printed lengthwise (the same graphic pattern is sported on the side of the car), 16-inch alloy wheels, and two-tone Frau leather seats with Guccissima print. The hatchback version was unveiled in metropolitan cities such as Paris, London, and Tokyo, followed by a European commercial launch in July. The production order was available between April 1 and June 30 in Europe, and become available in the rest of the world at the end of 2011. In 2011, the car made its U.S. debut at the New York Fashion Week.

The convertible version began to be available to order in August 2011. As part of the product launch, beginning on 19 August, 500C by Gucci car took a tour in Saint Tropez (from 19 to 27 August) followed by Berlin (8–14 September), Barcelona (25 September – 2 October), London (16–23 October) and Geneva (23–30 October). In Italy, the tour started from Forte Dei Marmi (22–28 August) and then reach Rome (4–11 September), Florence (19–26 September) and Milan (8–16 October).

=== 500 "America" (2012) ===
A total of 500 coupés and 500 convertible versions were available in the European market that was inspired by the United States where Fiat 500 sales began in 2011, and where Fiat's collaboration with the American pop singer Jennifer Lopez started. The "America" model includes mirror covers with "Stars & Stripes" graphics, stickers, dedicated beltline, and 16" alloy rims with red cap edge, an interior of red/ivory seats, and contrasting white dashboard, manual air conditioning, and exterior chrome-plated trim. The coupe model also includes metallic shade America Blue body.

The first car was won by Adelheid D. Kieper from Rosche, Germany, in a TwitBid campaign.

=== Fiat 500 Vintage 57/1957 Retro edition (2015) ===
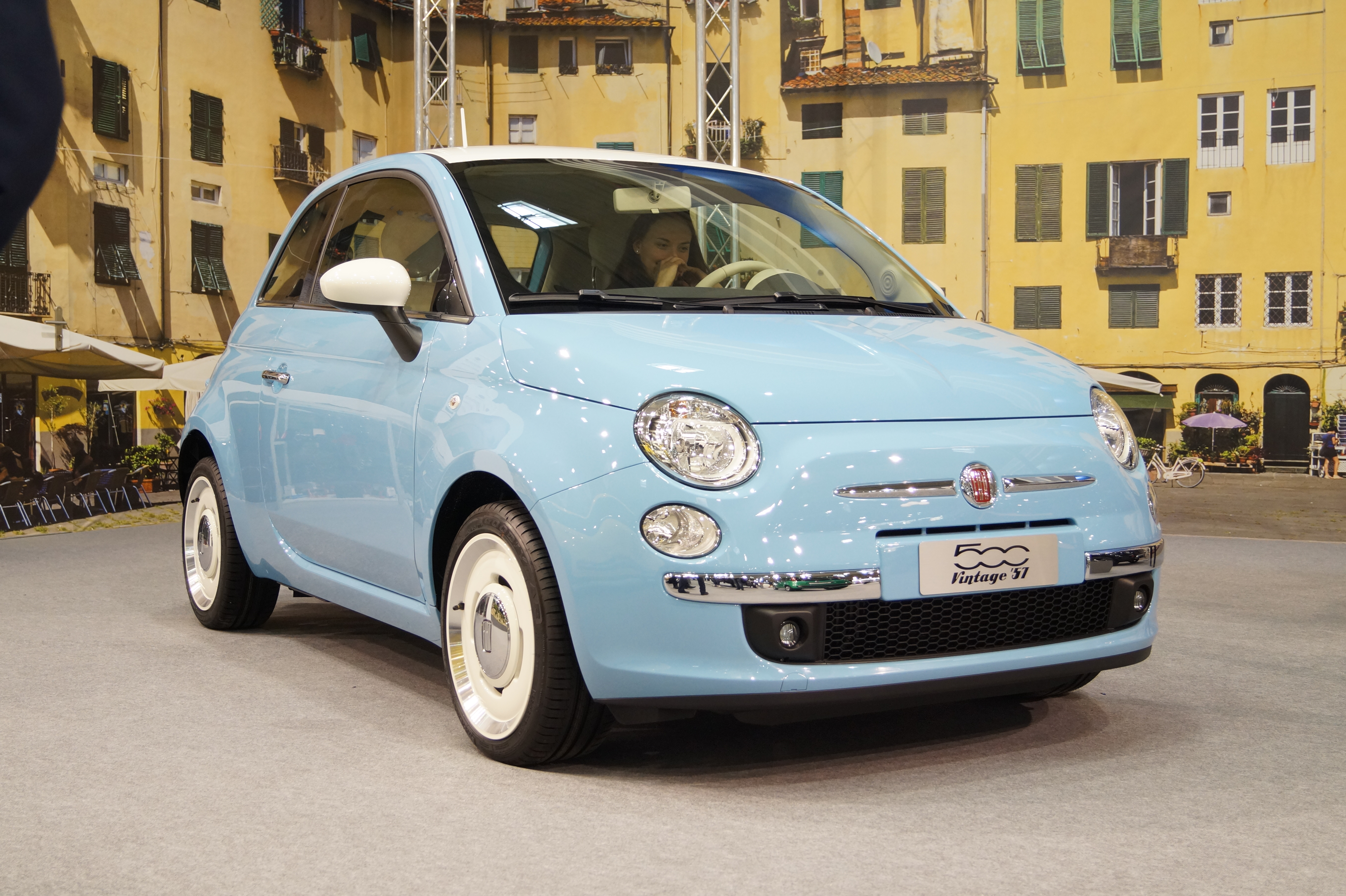
Fiat 500 Vintage 57

The special edition, marketed variously as the Vintage 57 (Europe) or as the 1957 Edition (North America), features exterior paint in Bianco (white), Verde Chiaro (light green), Celeste Blue (pastel sky blue), and red (not available in the USA), combined with a white roof and mirror caps; brown (in one of two shades) leather upholstery and color-matched (in the US, white elsewhere) 16-inch forged aluminum wheels, retro-styled with a wide chromed lip, body-color accent and large center caps with historic "FIAT" emblem — the design mimicking chrome hubcaps. The Vintage '57 500c features a dual-layer power-operated cloth top. The front hood and rear tailgate also feature a "FIAT" emblem which mixes its then-current design with the historic badge of 1957.

=== Fiat 500 Ron Arad Edition ===
This version of the Fiat 500 features a silhouette of the historic Nuova 500 on its side panels. The interior includes black-ivory Poltrona Frau leather upholstery. It is available only in Crossover Black Metallic with white trim.

=== 500 Riva (2017) ===
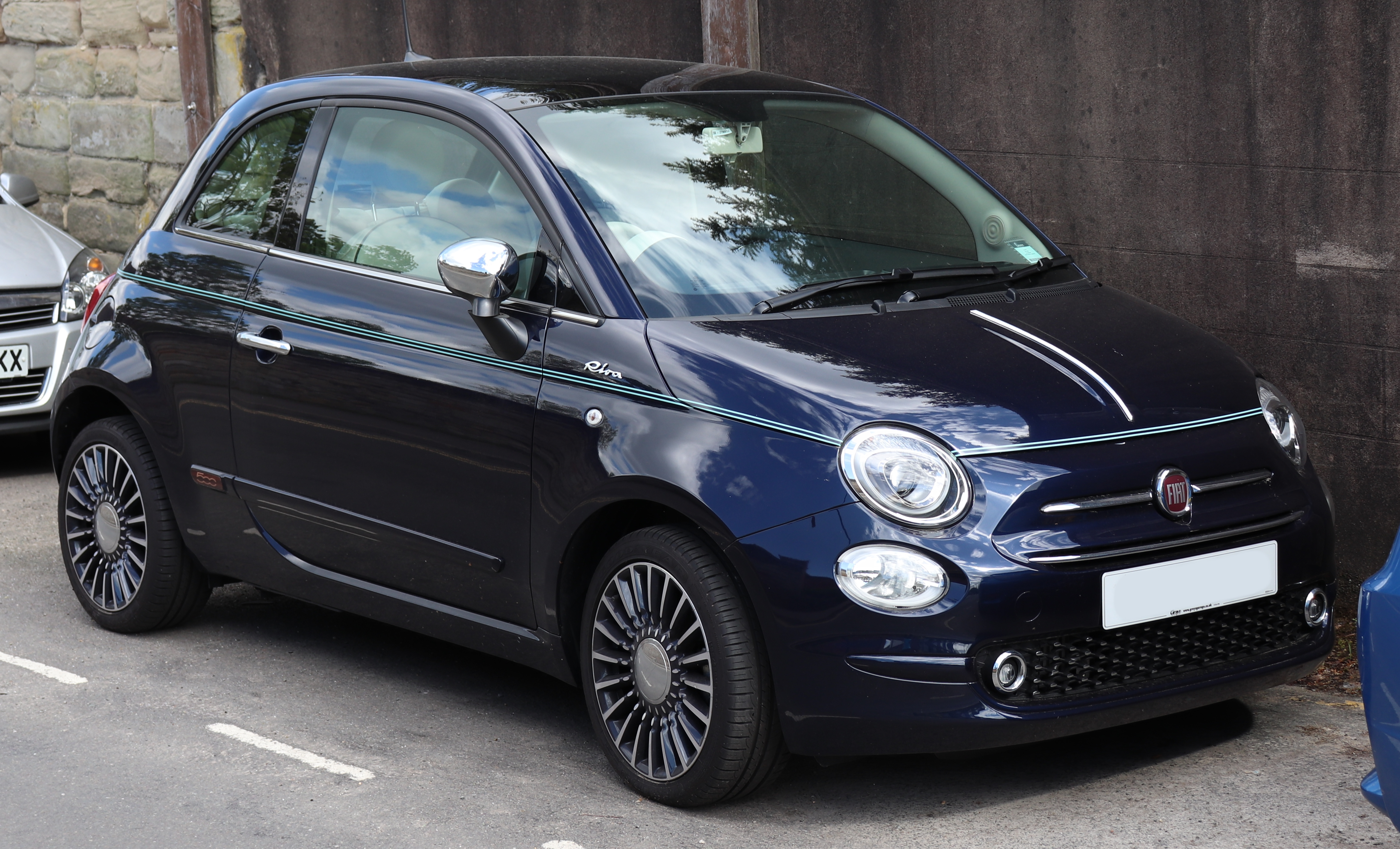
2016 Fiat 500 Riva (United Kingdom)

This is a special edition of the facelift Fiat 500 that showcases the Riva yacht brand, which is owned by the Ferretti Group. It features special Sera Blue paint with a contrasting double aquamarine line running around the waist of the car. The interior continues the luxury yacht theme, with ivory leather seats complemented by mahogany wood trim running across the dashboard. The Riva special edition is available in both hatchback and 500C convertible variants.

=== 500 Dolcevita (2019) ===
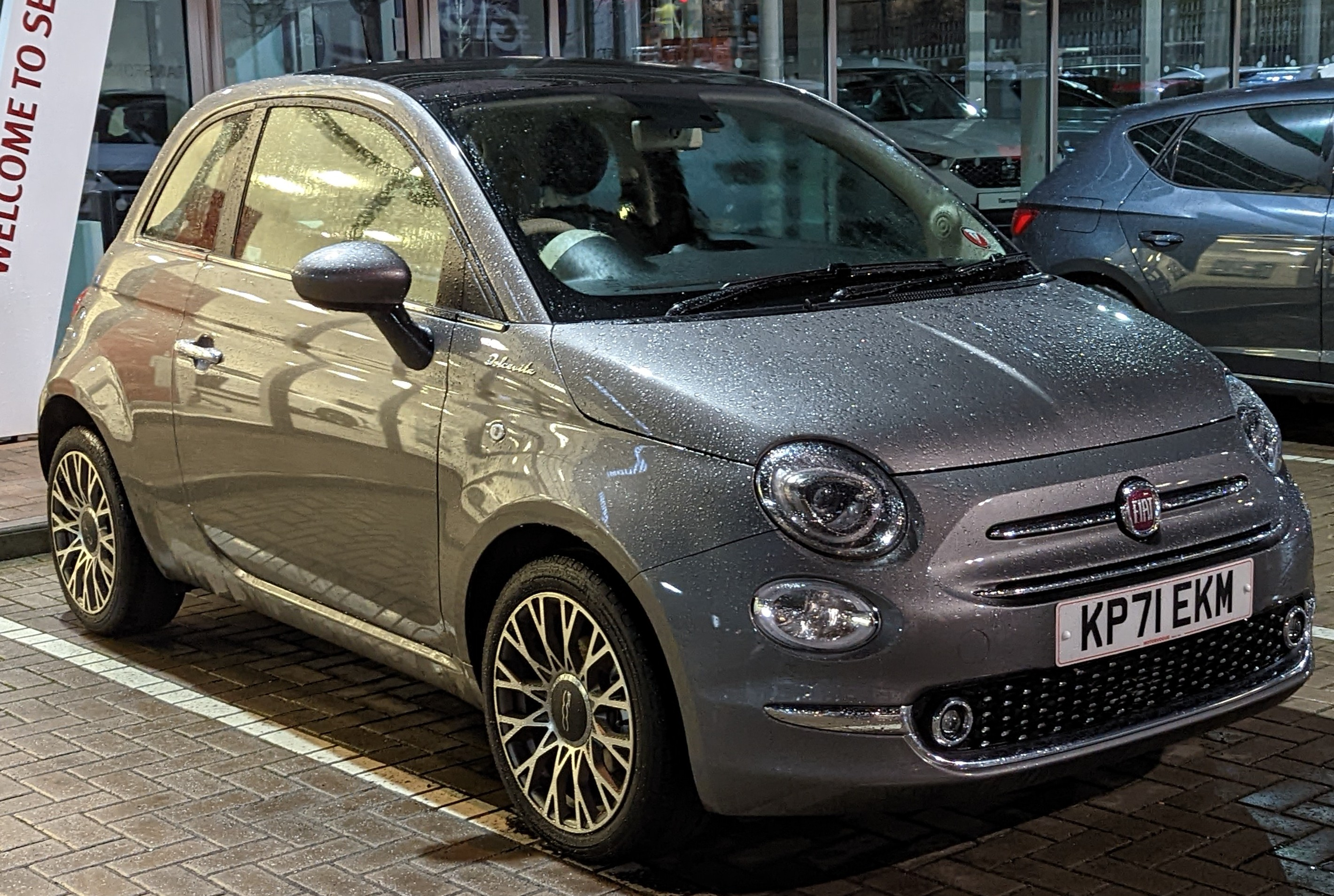
500 Dolcevita

The new Fiat 500 Dolcevita special edition sports a Gelato White livery, enhanced by a red, white and red beauty line drawn around the entire silhouette. The convertible version for the first time in the history of the model, it is fitted with a horizontal white-and-blue striped top with embroidered red "500" logo inspired by the deck chairs and beach umbrellas of the Italian Riviera of the Sixties. The engine range includes the 69-hp 1.2-litre engine paired with the Dualogic automatic or manual transmission, the 85-hp 0.9-litre Twin Air and the 69-hp 1.2 LPG, the latter two both with a manual transmission.

=== Fiat 500 Coupé Zagato concept (2011) ===
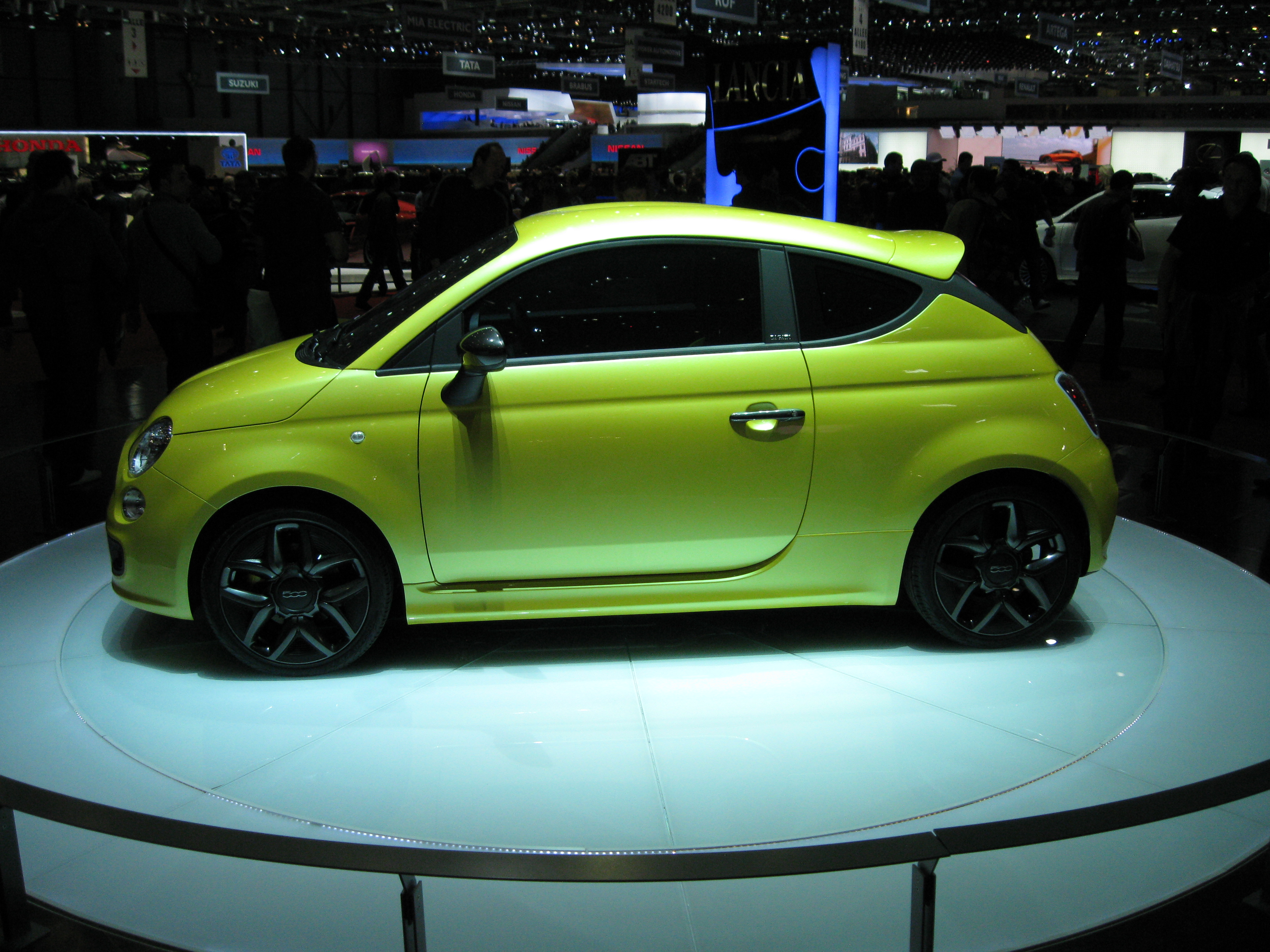
Fiat 500 Coupe Zagato concept at the 2011 Geneva Motor Show.

It included a double hump roof, a turbocharged Twin Air engine rated 105 PS (77 kW; 104 hp) at 5,500 rpm and 155 N⋅m (114 lb⋅ft) at 2,500 rpm, 17-inch "chrome shadow" wheels with a brand new double spoked shape and synthetic inserts (made of APP-TECH), 205/40R17 tyres, 4 perforated brake discs.

The vehicle was unveiled at the 2011 Geneva Motor Show.

The Zagato version was confirmed for production but no date has been given.

=== Zender Abarth 500 Corsa Stradale concept (2013) ===
The vehicle was unveiled at the 2013 Frankfurt Motor Show.

=== 500e concepts (2022) ===
FIAT unveiled 3 concepts of the 2024 Fiat 500e at the LA Auto Show. They are a preview of the upcoming redesigned second generation Fiat 500e to replace the original 500e that was discontinued in 2019.

=== Abarth 500 Opening Edition ===
The 500 Abarth "Opening Edition" is a limited production model (100 cars) for the Italian market. It includes the upgrades found in the 500 Abarth Esseesse. The car is available in two colours (Campovolo grey or pearlised White), while there is also the option of special stickers including a red chequered flag on the roof (exclusive to the Campovolo Grey shade) that pays homage to the numerous sporting victories of the Abarth brand.

=== Abarth 500 Assetto Corse ===
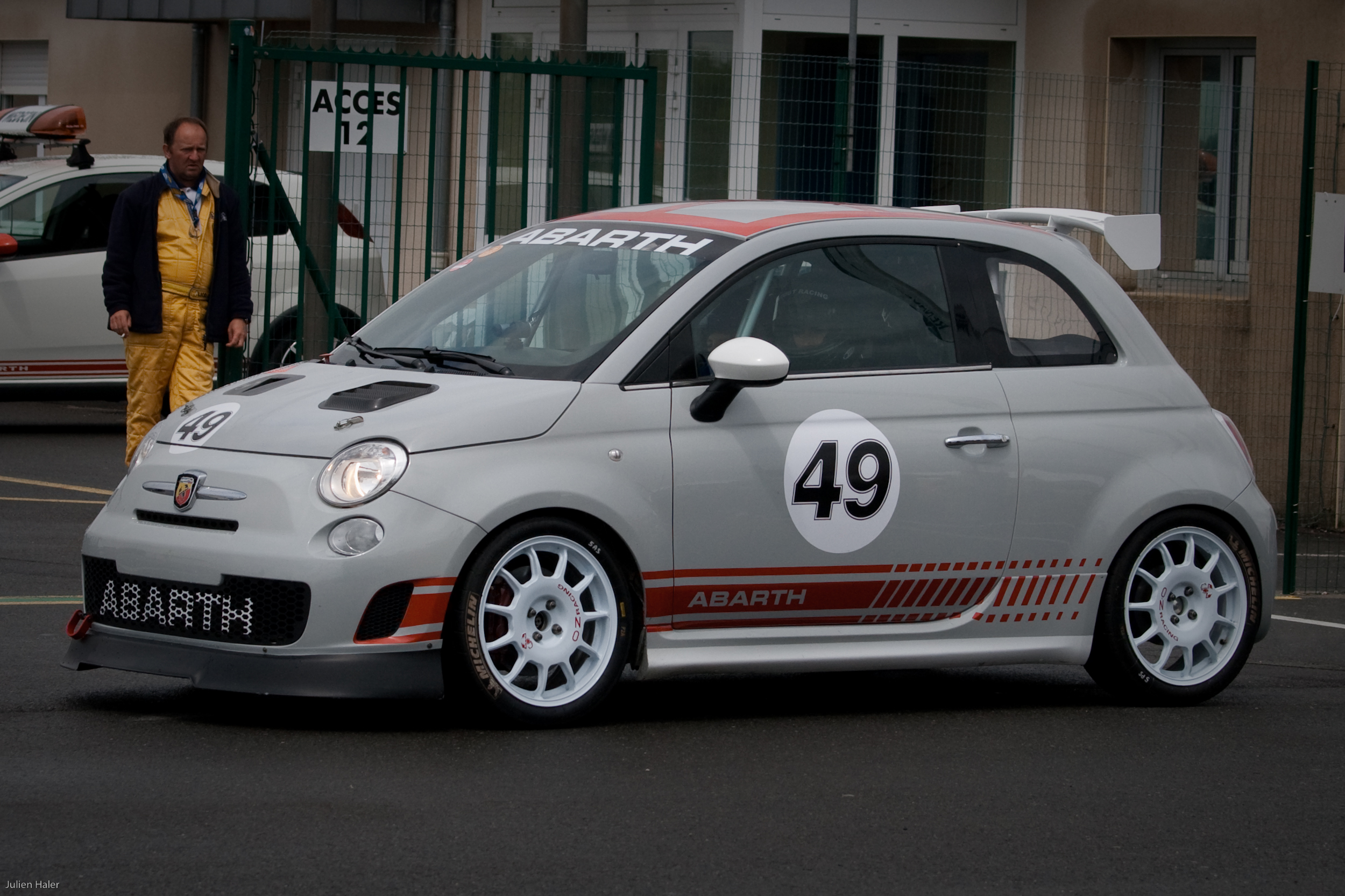
Abarth 500 Assetto Corse

Unveiled in the 2008 Paris Motor Show, the 500 Abarth Assetto Corse is a limited production model (49 cars), designed by the Fiat Group Automobiles Style Centre and produced by a team of Abarth Engineers and Designers. Engine is rated at 200 PS (147 kW; 197 hp) at 6,500 rpm and 300 N⋅m (221 lbf⋅ft) at 3,000 rpm. It includes white 17-inch (430 mm) special ultralight racing wheels, low ride, sports racing mirrors and a place for a number on the sides and a pastel grey body color with red Abarth side stripes.

=== Abarth 695 "Tributo Ferrari" (2009) ===
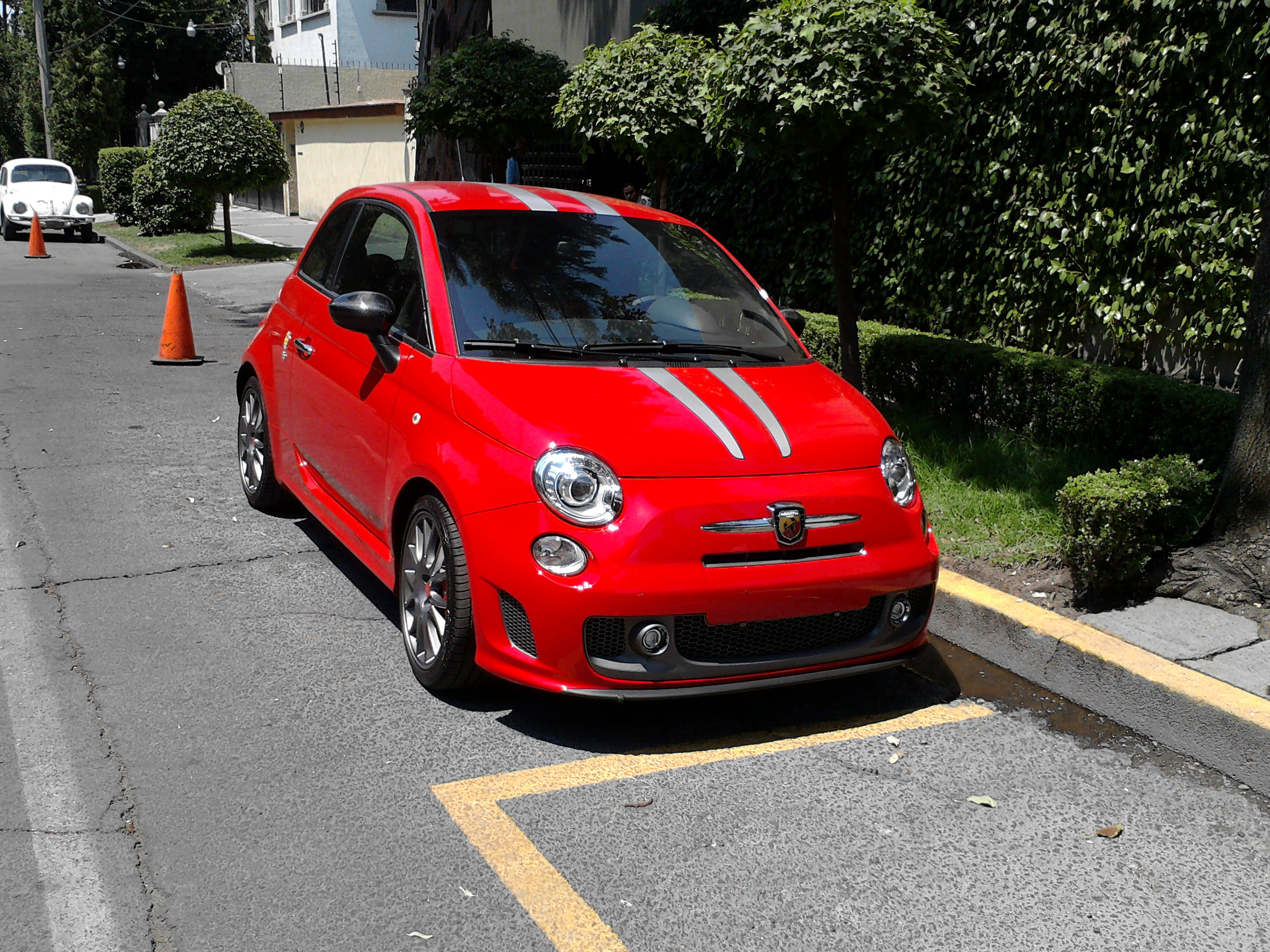
Abarth 695 Tributo Ferrari red with grey stripes

The Abarth 695 "Tributo Ferrari" is a limited-edition version developed in collaboration with engineers from Ferrari based on Abarth 500. The 1,368 cc (1.4 L; 83.5 cu in) Turbo T-Jet 16v engine is further developed and uses a different Garrett turbocharger. Rated at over 180 PS (132 kW; 178 hp) at 5,500 rpm and 250 N⋅m (184 lb⋅ft) of torque at 3,000 rpm. It includes an "MTA" (automated manual transmission), an electrohydraulic-actuated transmission with paddle shifters, unique to this version, 17 inch alloy wheels with performance tyres, Brembo 284 mm (11.2 in) multi-section discs with fixed 4-piston calipers, "Record Monza" variable back-pressure "dual mode" exhaust, Scuderia Red body with Racing Grey wheels and rear air intakes, Magneti Marelli Automotive Lighting xenon headlights, "Abarth Corsa by Sabelt" seats in black leather upholstery with carbon fibre shell and seat base, black leather steering wheel with red leather inserts and a tricolour hub, Jaeger instrument panel, non-slip aluminium foot wells, Scorpion racing pedals, special kick plates and a plate bearing the vehicle series number. This version will eventually be released also in blue, yellow and grey. The vehicle was unveiled in the 2009 Frankfurt Motor Show.

=== Abarth 500 SpeedGrey (2009) ===
The Abarth 500 "SpeedGrey" is a very limited-edition version model (10 cars only) produced by Neubauer, the official Abarth distributor in France, exclusively for the French market. Starting from the "Esseesse" version of the Abarth 500, Neubauer added the "Record Monza" variable back-pressure "dual mode" exhaust system (boosting output to 165 PS (121 kW; 163 hp)), as well as a pair of "Abarth Corsa by Sabelt" seats in black leather upholstery with carbon-fibre shell and seat base. Tinted windows were added, along with the Blue&Me GPS system. Finally, Neubauer repainted the car in a special "Maserati Grey" paint.

=== Abarth 500 "Cabrio Italia" (2011) ===
The Abarth 500 "Cabrio Italia" is a limited (150 units) model commemorating the 150th anniversary of Italian unity, unveiled at the 64th Frankfurt International Motor Show in 2011. It includes the 1.4 Turbo T-Jet engine from the Abarth Esseesse, 5-speed manual gearbox, Torque Transfer Control device, Esseesse brake system, Abarth Corsa by Sabelt natural leather seats, Blu Abu Dhabi shade dashboard, Abarth Blue&Me MAP satellite navigation unit with a telemetric function developed by Magneti Marelli, black leather with a double-stitching steering wheel, magnesium shade mirror covers, 10-spoke 17" rims with diamond effect and yellow Brembo front calipers.

=== Abarth 695 Competizione (2011) ===
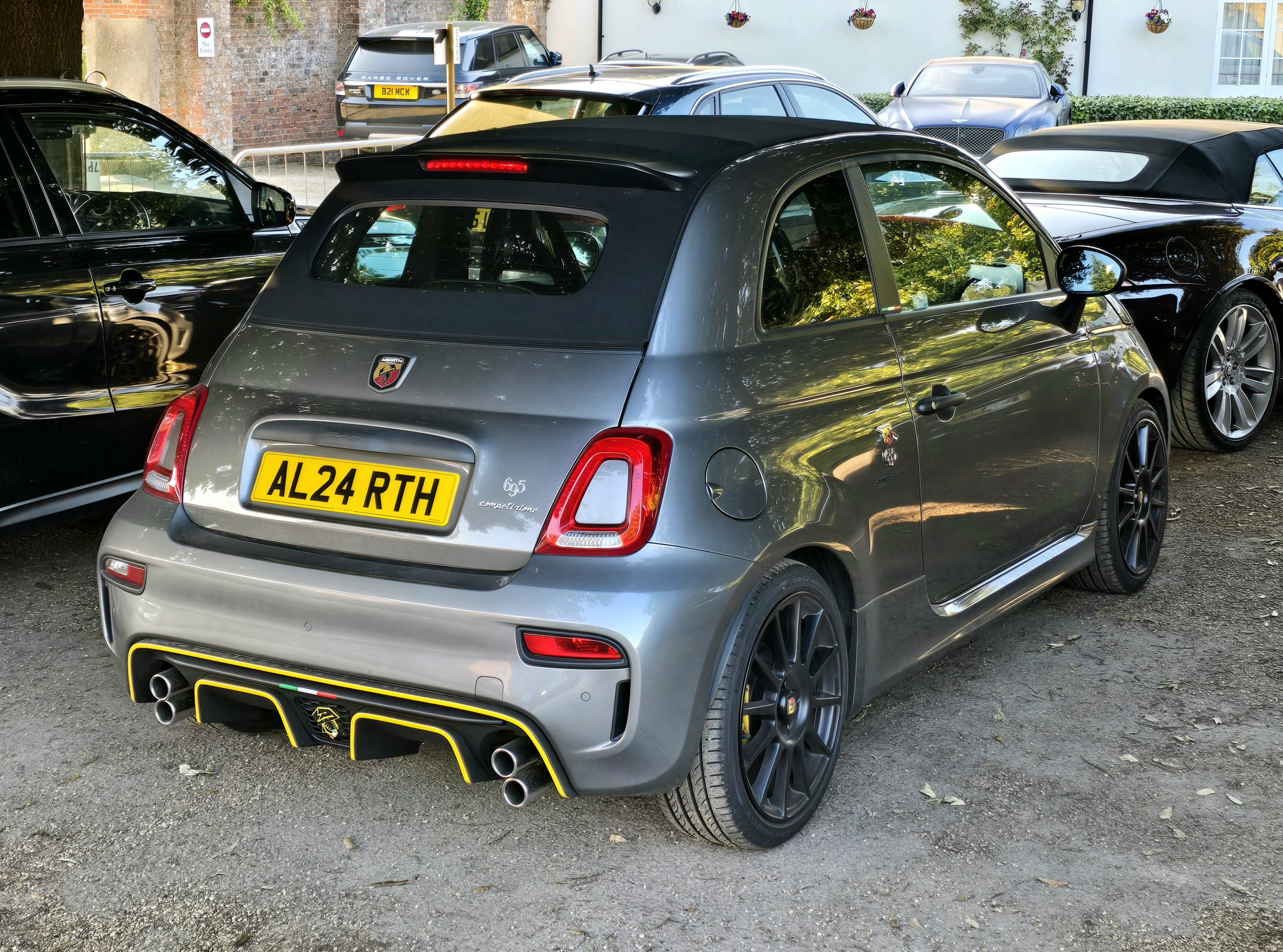
Abarth 695 Competizione

The Abarth 695 "Competizione" is inspired by the Abarth 500 Assetto Corsa, which debuted at the 2011 Frankfurt International Motor Show together with the Cabrio Italia. It includes only 2 seats with a rear roll bar, Grigio Competizione Opaco paint, Abarth Corsa by Sabelt seats in black leather with red Alcantara leather inserts with carbon fiber shell and seat base, black leather steering wheel, 5-speed "Abarth Competizione" gearshift paddles, instrument panel made by Jaeger, Abarth Blue&Me MAP satellite navigation unit with a telemetric function developed by Magneti Marelli, Abarth logo racing pedals, Xenon headlights with dipped and main beam functions, 17-inch rims from Abarth 695 Tributo Ferrari, red Brembo brake calipers and center cap, 1.4 Turbo T-Jet engine rated 180 PS (132 kW; 178 hp), Abarth Competizione electromechanical transmission, Brembo 305 mm disc brakes with fixed four-piston caliper disc and special shock absorbers and Record Monza variable back-pressure "dual mode" exhaust.

=== Abarth 695 Tributo Maserati (2012) ===
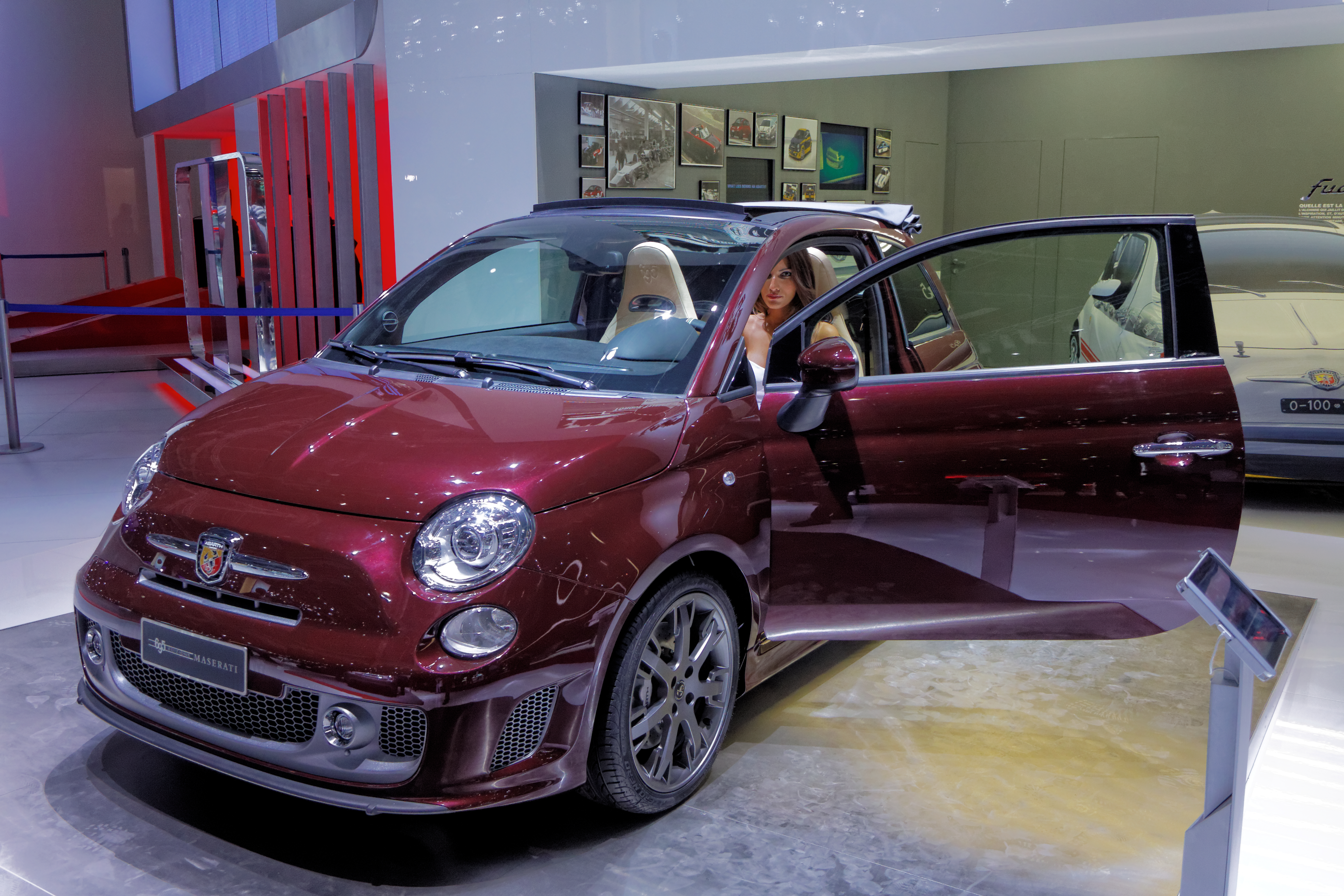
Abarth 695C Edizione Maserati

It is a limited (499 vehicles) version of the Abarth 500C convertible with the 1.4 Turbo T-Jet 16v engine rated at 180 PS (132 kW; 178 hp), 5-speed electrically operated manual Abarth Competizione gearbox with steering wheel controls, Maserati "Neptune" 17" alloy wheels with performance tires, Brembo 305 mm brake discs with fixed four-piston caliper and special shock absorbers, Record Modena variable back-pressure "dual mode" exhaust, Pontevecchio Bordeaux body-color, Xenon headlights with dipped and driving light functions, sand beige Poltrona Frau leather seats with containment strips featuring single-layer padding and the pista grey contrasting electro-welding, black leather steering wheel, aluminum pedal unit and sill plate, carbon fiber kick plate and boosted hi-fi audio system.

The vehicle was unveiled at the 2012 Geneva Motor Show.

=== Abarth 595 '50th Anniversary' (2013–) ===
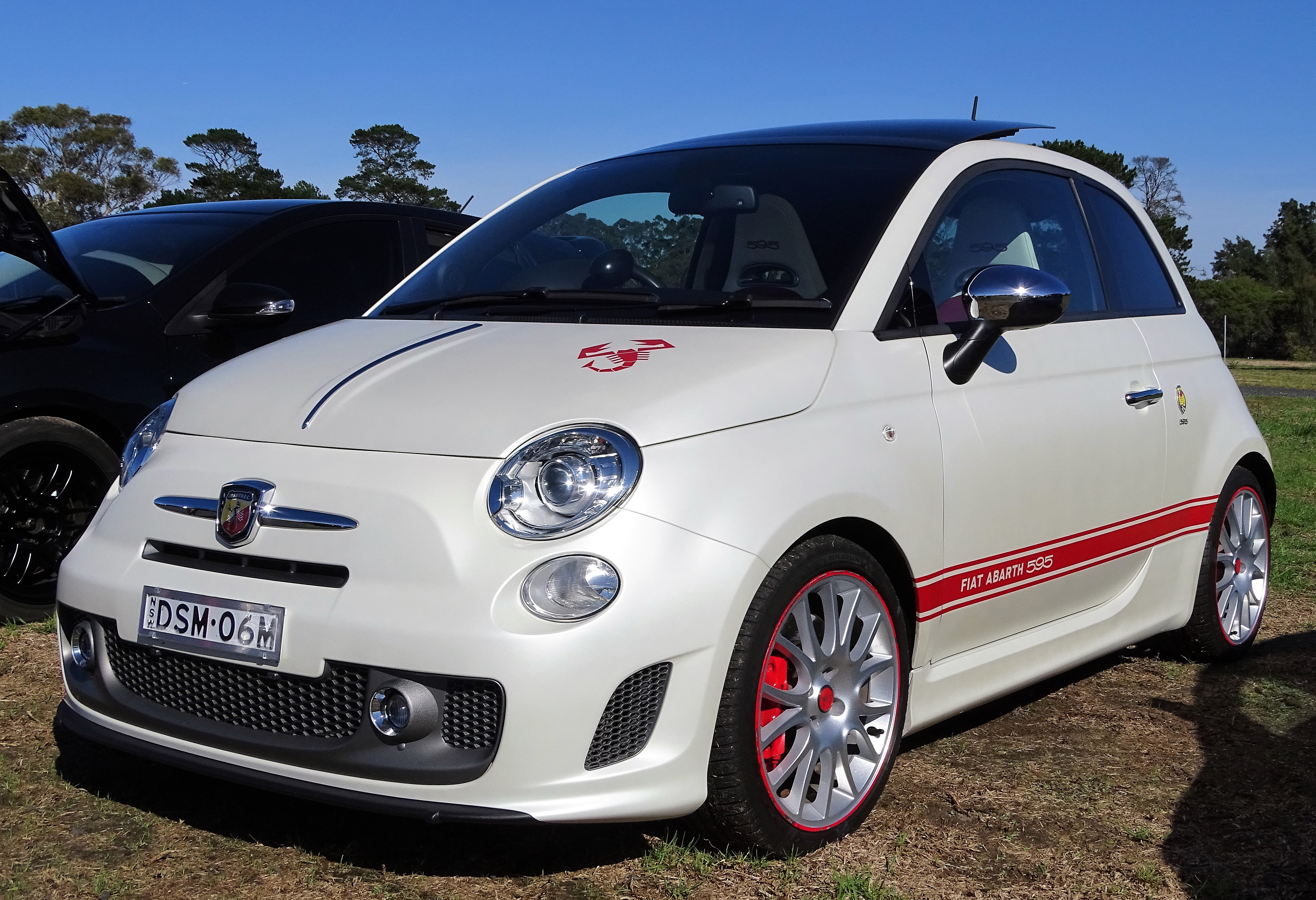
Abarth 595 '50th Anniversary'

It is a limited (299 vehicles) version of the Abarth 595 commemorating the 50th anniversary of the original Fiat-Abarth 595, with 180 PS (132 kW; 178 hp) 1.4 T-Jet engine, Abarth Competizione gearbox, 17-inch alloy wheels with 695 Magnesio Grey design embellished and red liner, Brembo 305 mm floating brake discs, fixed four-piston caliper, special shock absorbers, 'Record Monza' variable back-pressure dual-mode exhaust, matt three-layer white body color, Xenon headlights with dipped and driving light functions, red leather sports seats with white inserts and red stitching, Abarth logo at the black leather steering wheel with red inserts and finder and the kick plate.

The vehicle was unveiled at the 2013 Frankfurt Motor Show.

=== Abarth 500 esseesse ===
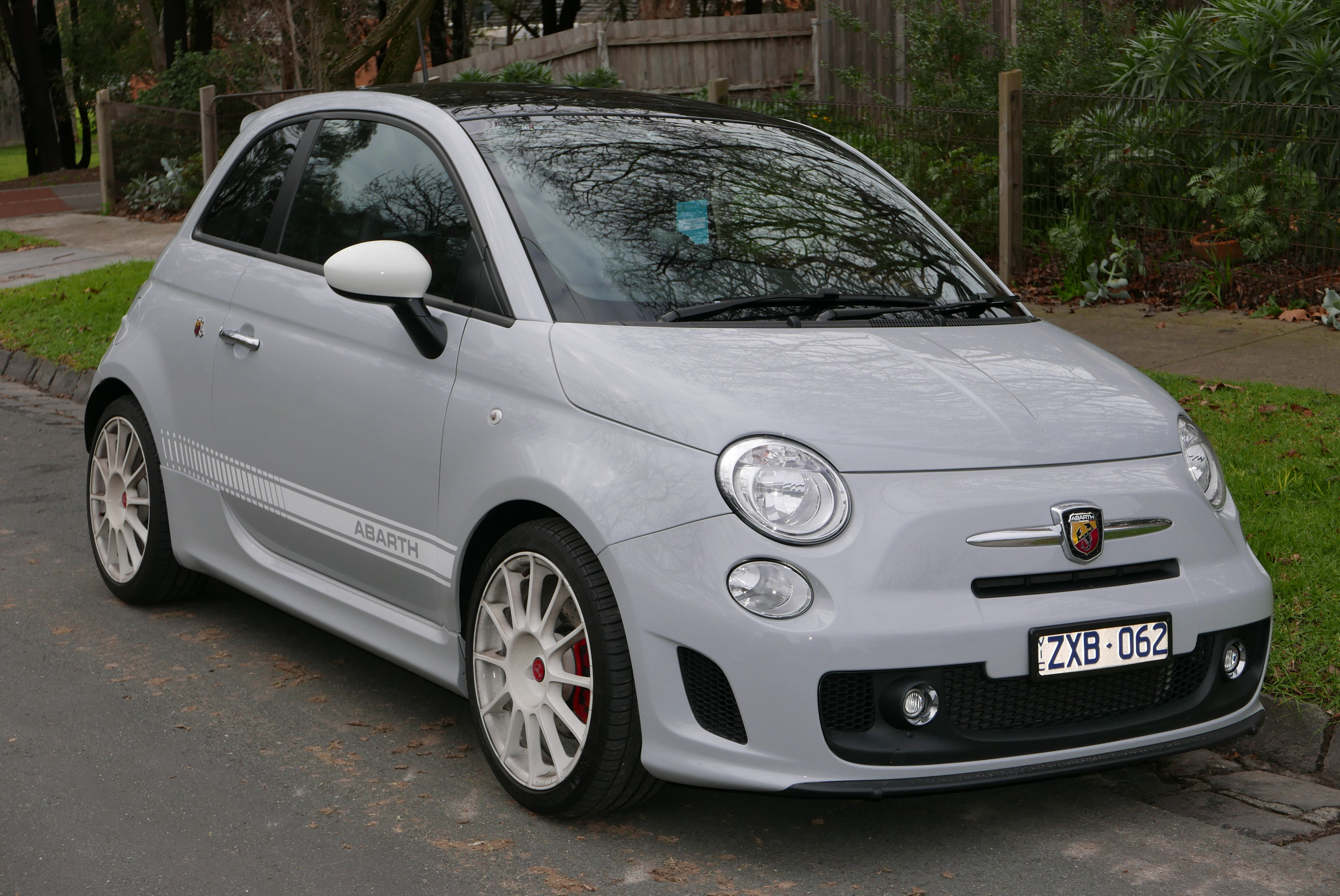
Abarth 500 Esseesse hatchback

The 500 Abarth esseesse is a conversion kit for the Abarth 500, to be installed within 12 months or 20,000 km (12,000 mi) of the car's first registration. The engine is upgraded to 160 PS (118 kW; 158 hp) at 5,750 rpm and 206 N⋅m (152 lb⋅ft) at 3,000 rpm (230 N⋅m (170 lb⋅ft) in sport mode). The kit also includes cross-drilled and ventilated 284 mm (11.2 in) x 22 mm (0.87 in) front brake discs with new pads, 240 mm (9.4 in) x 11 mm (0.43 in) cross-drilled rear brake discs, lowered springs, sport air filter, 17-inch white or titanium colour alloy wheels with 205/40 R17 tyres, tyre pressure monitoring system, and a unique key cover. The conversion costs £2,500 in the UK.

=== Giannini 350 GP (2017) ===
The Giannini 350 GP was a car built by Giannini Automobili to celebrate its 100th anniversary. It has 350 horsepower that comes from a 1.7 liter turbocharged 4-cylinder and RWD. It was limited to just 100 units and was sold for 150,000 euros.

=== Abarth 695 70° Anniversario (2019–) ===
The Abarth 695 70° Anniversario was unveiled at the 2019 Abarth Days in Milan, as part of the brand's 70th-anniversary celebrations. Limited to 1949 units, it is powered by the 180 PS (132 kW; 178 hp) 1.4 Turbo T-Jet engine. Highlights of the special edition include an adjustable rear spoiler.

=== 500 Edicion Especial Tributo a Mexico (2019) ===
Abarth has recently launched a special edition of the 500 for the Mexican market to end its production in Toluca. It has a 1.4 litre 160 hp (119 kW), 170 lb⋅ft (230 N⋅m) turbo engine, accompanied by a 5-gear manual transmission gearbox or a 6-speed automatic transmission, but with 157 hp (117 kW) and 183 lb⋅ft (248 N⋅m) of torque. It has a 17" Pirelli PZero Nero aluminium alloy wheels, disc brakes in all wheels and security assistance such as ABS, traction and stability control, and 7 airbags. It is limited to 37 units.

== International markets ==
=== Mexico (North America) ===
The new 500 was introduced in Mexico in September 2008, powered the 1.4 L 16V 100 PS (74 kW; 99 hp) engine, transmissions are Dualogic for the '500 Classic', '500 Lounge' and '500 Vintage' trims or six-speed manual gearbox for the '500 Sport' Trim. The 'Abarth 500', 'Abarth 500 esseesse', 'Abarth 500C', and the 'Abarth 695 Tributo Ferrari' variants have been sold through independent importers. Mexico became the first country in the Americas in which the new 500 is sold. As of 2011, the Fiat 500 is also manufactured in Mexico. In 2012 when the North American 500 released all Mexican 500's got an update to meet the North American Spec. As of Sept. 2019, the Nuova 500 has ended production for the North American market.

=== Canada and United States ===
The Fiat 500 debuted at the 2010 North American International Auto Show with production beginning in December 2010 — effectively reintroducing the Fiat brand in the United States and Canada after 26 years. The North American 500 is marketed in Pop, Lounge, Sport and Turbo trim levels with market-specific modifications including increased body strength; revised suspension; changes for reduced noise, vibration, and harshness; BiHalogen projector headlamps and amber front and red rear sidemarker lights and reflectors on each wheel arch edge to comply with FMVSS 108; new four-wheel anti-lock disc brake system with new front calipers; larger 10.5 US gal (40 L; 9 imp gal) fuel tank; upgraded heating and cooling system; revised front seats with an armrest and seat cushion; easy entry system designed into the driver's seats; revised steering wheel controls and revised steering; a Bose branded audio system as well as a more rounded center grille and a plastic lip that wraps onto the bottom of the spoiler. FCA offers the North American 500 with either an AISIN 6-speed automatic transmission with a driver-selectable mode as well as a 5-speed manual.

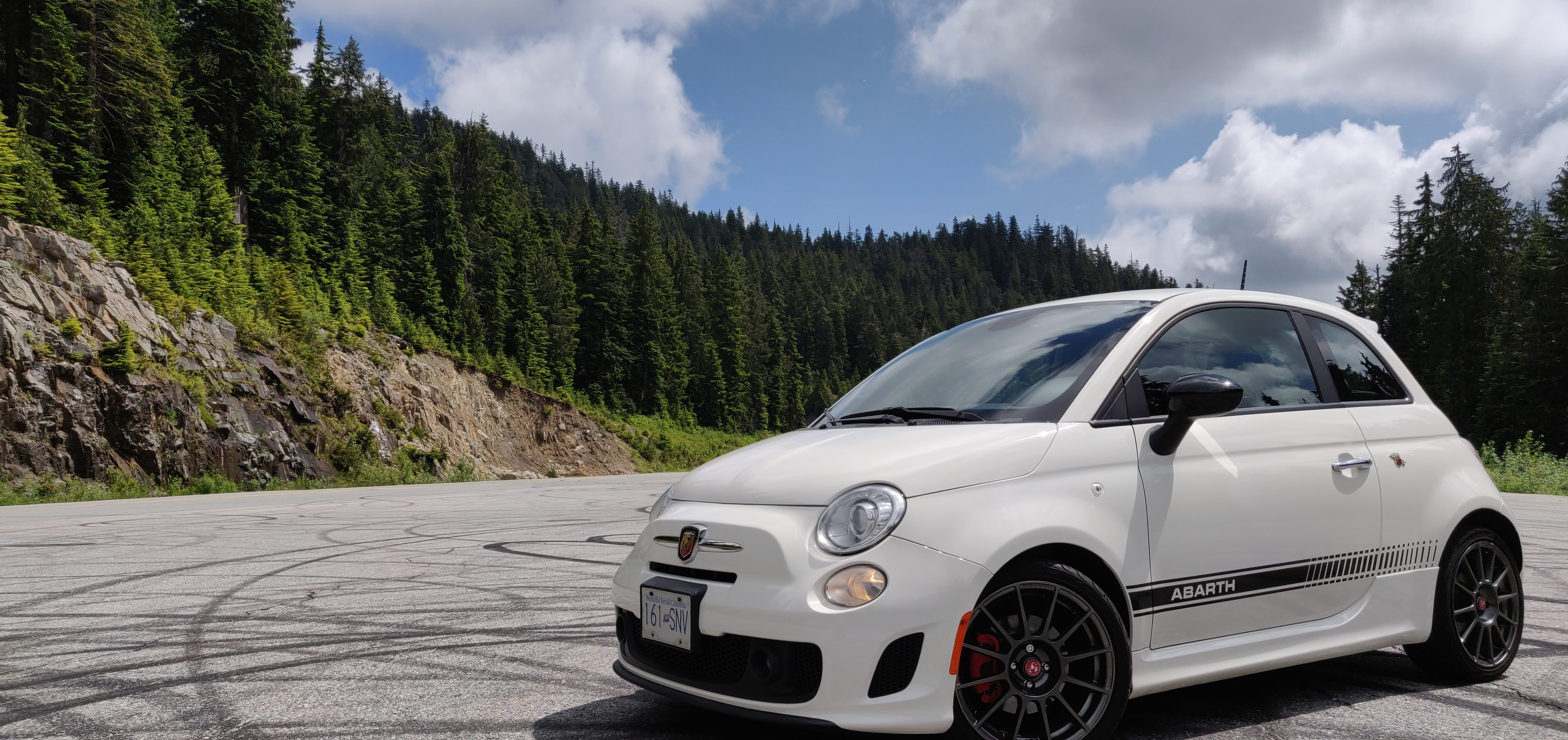
2013 Fiat 500 Abarth North American

Fiat began marketing the 500C in Spring 2011. The 500 Abarth is also confirmed for North American markets. The North American 500 has the 1.4-litre 16v MultiAir FIRE engine from the Fiat Panda 100HP, and the European-market Fiat 500 1.4 16v. The engine produces 100 hp (75 kW) at 6,750 rpm and 97 lb⋅ft (132 N⋅m) at 4,250 rpm. The US version of the 500 is rated at 38 mpg_{‑US} (6.2 L/100 km; 46 mpg_{‑imp}) highway by United States Environmental Protection Agency when equipped with the manual transmission; the 500 with the automatic transmission has a fuel mileage of 34 mpg_{‑US} (6.9 L/100 km; 41 mpg_{‑imp}) highway. The Toluca-built version of the 500 is for sale in the U.S., Canada, and Mexico and was launched in mid-2011 in Brazil and Argentina where it replaces the European version made in Poland.

For 2015 the 500 lines (500, 500c, and 500/500c Abarth) received updates to its interior styling and features. The Easy model is added above the Pop model and below the Sport model. All models also now include the U Connect 5.0BT infotainment system, which features an AM-FM stereo, iPod/USB and 3.5-millimeter auxiliary audio input jacks, U Connect hands-free Bluetooth phone w/ hands-free stereo audio streaming, a five-inch color touch-screen display, and voice command, plus six speakers (six Beats premium amplified speakers on higher-end models), replacing the previous stereo, which included an AM-FM stereo, single-disc CD/MP3 player, 3.5-millimeter auxiliary audio input jack, and six speakers. A rearview backup camera with rear backup sensors is available, as well as a built-in GPS navigational system. SIRIUS-XM Satellite Radio remains an option on lower models and standard on higher-end models. The 500e electric model is not available for 2016. Trim levels are the Easy (500 ONLY), Pop, Sport, and Abarth. The 1957 Edition is replaced by a Retro Appearance Package, which is now available on all 500 models (aside from the performance-oriented Abarth model). The Abarth version for North America was introduced in the LA Auto Show in November 2011 with a 1.4 L turbocharged Multiair engine producing 160 hp (119 kW) and 170 lb⋅ft (230 N⋅m) of torque.The NA Abarths came with the esseesse package as standard.

The 500 Turbo model went on sale for the 2013 model year featuring a 1.4 L turbocharged Multiair engine rated 135 hp (101 kW) and 150 lb⋅ft (203 N⋅m) of torque, 16-inch aluminum wheels with Nero (black) painted pockets, semi- metallic brake linings at all four corners, larger 11.1-inch ventilated front rotors, brake calipers lacquered in Rosso (red) paint, taillamps with Gloss Black bezels, black-accented rear diffuser, choice of 7 body colours (Argento (silver), Bianco (white), Grigio (gray), Nero (black), Rame (copper), Rosso (red) and all-new Verde Azzurro (green & blue)), leather-wrapped shift knob and steering wheel with Argento (silver) stitching, a Grigio/Nero (gray/black) seating and interior environment, optional Nero/Nero (black/black) or vivid Rosso/Nero (red/black) heated leather seating, optional Beats by Dr. Dre audio system (6 premium speakers, an 8-inch dual-voice coil (DVC) subwoofer with trunk-mounted enclosure and 8-channel 368-watt amplifier with Beats Audio digital sound processing (DSP) algorithm). As of 2018, the 500 Turbo engine, brakes, 16" wheels, suspension tuning, and body kit became standard for all 500 trim levels in the US market (aside from the more powerful 500 Abarth and the electric-drive 500e), and new colors were introduced: Brillante Red, Mezzanotte Blue Pearl, and Vesuvio Black Pearl. As of September 2019, the Nuova 500 has ended production for the North American market. 2019 is the final model year for the Fiat 500, 500c, 500e, and Abarth in North America, while the 500L and 500X continued to be sold there.

==== U.S. special editions ====
===== Fiat Cinquecento Prima Edizione (2010) =====
It is a limited (500 units) version of the Fiat 500 with the 1.4L 16v 100HP engine, for the US market. It include a choice of 3 body colours (Bianco (White), Rosso (Red) and Grigio (Gray)), 5spd manual transmission, exclusive Prima Edizione badge, sequential VIN and badge.

===== 2012 "Pink Ribbon" Edition (2011) =====
It is a limited (250 units) version of the 2012 Fiat 500 Lounge model produced in partnership with The Breast Cancer Research Foundation. It includes a choice of Argento (silver) and Bianco (white) body, with a signature dark pink bodyside stripe, Nero leather front and rear seats with pink accent stitching on the perimeter and signature "500" logo embroidered on the front seatbacks and a pink ribbon embroidered on the floor mats and pink accents on Nero leather steering wheel.

===== Fiat 500 Stinger (2012) =====
It is a production version of the 2011 Specialty Equipment Market Association (SEMA) Hottest Sports Compact Car award-winning car but based on the 2012 Fiat 500 Sport with 2-stage options.

Stage 1 includes Giallo (yellow) exterior body, Black Chrome exterior door handles and mirror caps, 17-inch by 7-inch Abarth Hyper Black aluminum wheels with wider 205/40 R 17 performance tires, tinted head and taillamps and license-plate brow, Mopar's vinyl bodyside and roof graphics in the black checker, Mopar's Katzkin leather seats, Alcantara seat centres, Giallo black leather bolsters, and Giallo accent stitching, Mopar carbon-fiber instrument panel decal and Mopar shifter ball finished in Gloss Black.

Stage 2 includes Mopar's cold-air intake and free-flowing cat-back exhaust, performance brakes with cross-drilled rotors.

===== 2014 Fiat 500c GQ Edition (2014–) =====
It is a version of the 2014 Fiat 500c produced in association with Condé Nast, with the 1.4-liter MultiAir Turbo (160 hp) engine, five-speed manual transmission, 16-inch split five-spoke aluminum wheels with Hyper Nero (black) with a Rosso (red) center cap and accenting inner backbone, a cloth-top mounted spoiler, a rear-fascia diffuser with dual exhaust, Gloss Nero headlamp, taillamp and parking lamp bezels, a "GQ 500" badge located on the B-pillar, a thick-rim three-spoke steering wheel wrapped in Nero leather with a contrasting Steam (white) inner leather ring, a large concentric instrument cluster with 160-mph speedometer, tachometer and trip computer sits behind the steering wheel with a Nero leather-wrapped cluster brow finished with Tungsten accent stitching; a Nero shift knob with Tungsten accent thread stitching, satin chrome interior accents, Nero leather-wrapped tightly contoured seat bolsters, Alcantara inserts and a Steam leatherette center stripe on the seat cushion, Tungsten accent stitching and a "GQ" embossed in the seatbacks, instrument panel bezel matching body colour with a matte finish, a choice of 4 body colours (Nero Puro (straight black), Argento (silver), Granito Lucente (granite crystal) and Bianco (white)).

The vehicle was unveiled in the 2013 Concorso Italiano auto show, followed by the 2013 Frankfurt Motor Show, and 2014 Toronto Auto Show.

US model was scheduled to arrive to FIAT studios nationwide in early 2014.

===== 2014 Fiat 500 1957 Edition (2014) =====
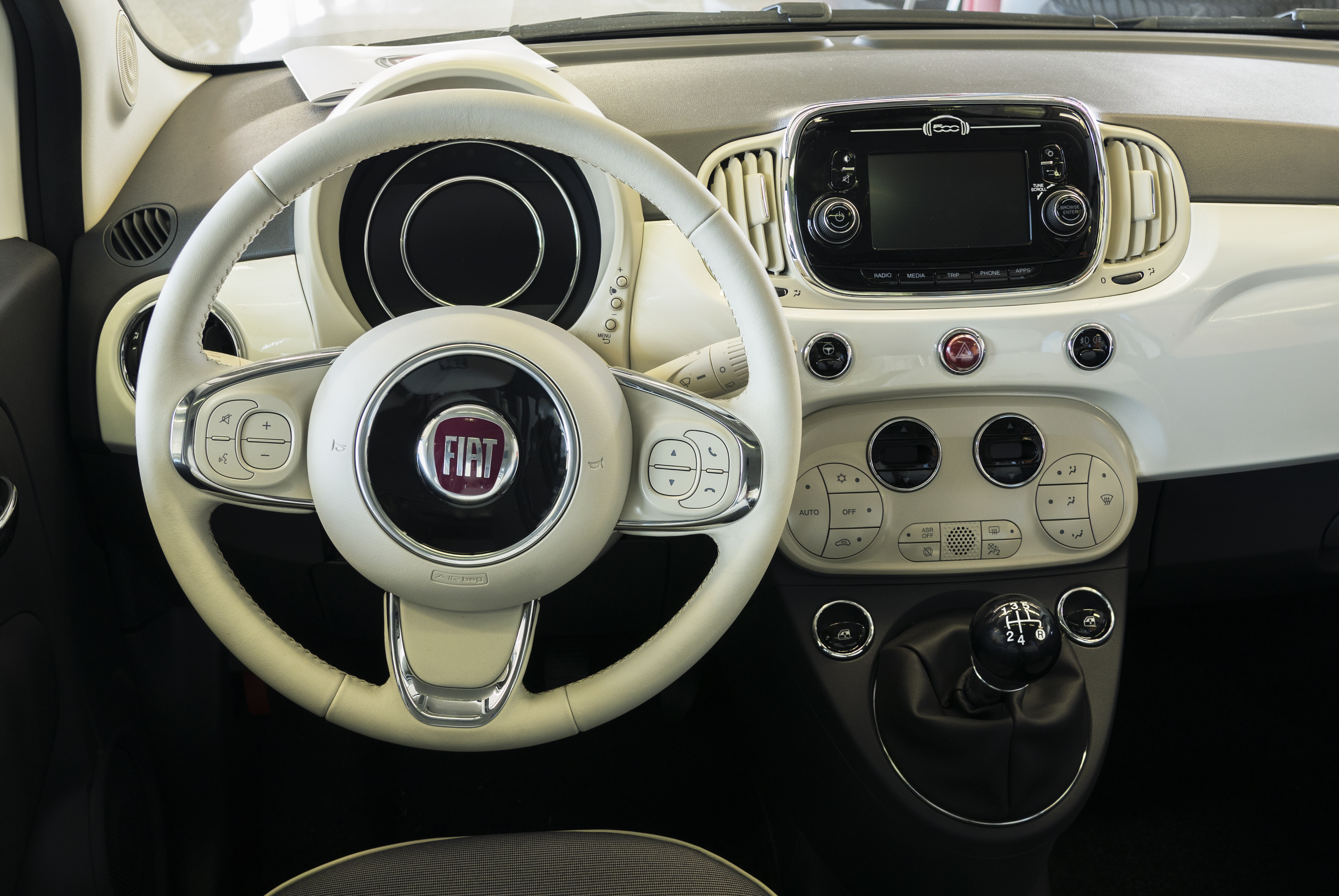
Dashboard in white (2015 model year)

It is a limited version of the 2014 Fiat 500 Lounge for the North American market, commemorating the 57th anniversary of the original 1957 "Nuova" Cinquecento. It included the 1.4l 16v 100HP engine, choice of 3 body colours (Bianco (white), Verde Chiaro (light green) or exclusive Celeste (celestial blue)) with Bianco roof and mirror caps, 16-inch retro wheel design with a wide chromed lip, body-color accent and large center cap with historic "FIAT" emblem; a sport-tuned suspension and all-season performance tires, "FIAT" badges on the front fascia and rear liftgate, Avorio (ivory) interior, Marrone (brown) leather seats, Avorio accent stitching at the seatbacks and seat cushions and perimeter; Grigio (grey) door panels with a unique Avorio inner panel, Marrone door armrests and shift boot (with manual transmission) are color-keyed to the leather seats; exclusive Avorio leather-wrapped steering wheel with Marrone leather on the "inner ring" and features a retro "FIAT" badge; a uniquely styled key fob with Marrone casing and Avorio-painted "1957" graphic, six-speaker and 276-watt FIAT premium audio system with SiriusXM Radio, C514 five-speed manual transmission (optional six-speed automatic transmission with driver-selectable gear changes), driver-selectable "Sport" mode on the instrument panel.

The vehicles arrive at FIAT Studios in the Spring of 2014. Ordering for the US model was set to begin in early 2014.

==== North American safety ====
On October 18, 2011, the North American Fiat 500 earned the IIHS (The Insurance Institute for Highway Safety) Top Safety Pick award. In 2011 Fiat sold 19,769 units of the Fiat 500 in the United States. Fiat 500 sales between January and September 2012 is 32,742 units.

The Fiat 500 and Fiat 500L scored a "Poor" rating on the IIHS small overlap crash test.

== Electric models ==
Refer to § 500e

=== Micro Vett ===
The Micro Vett electric Fiat 500 has been presented at the London Auto Show by the NICE Car Company. The Micro-Vett electric Fiat 500 is powered by a Lithium polymer – Kokam battery with a 22 kWh capacity and is able to get to a top speed of 60 mph (97 km/h). The range of the Micro-Vett electric Fiat 500 is 70 miles (110 km) and after that will need 6–8 hours to re-charge it.

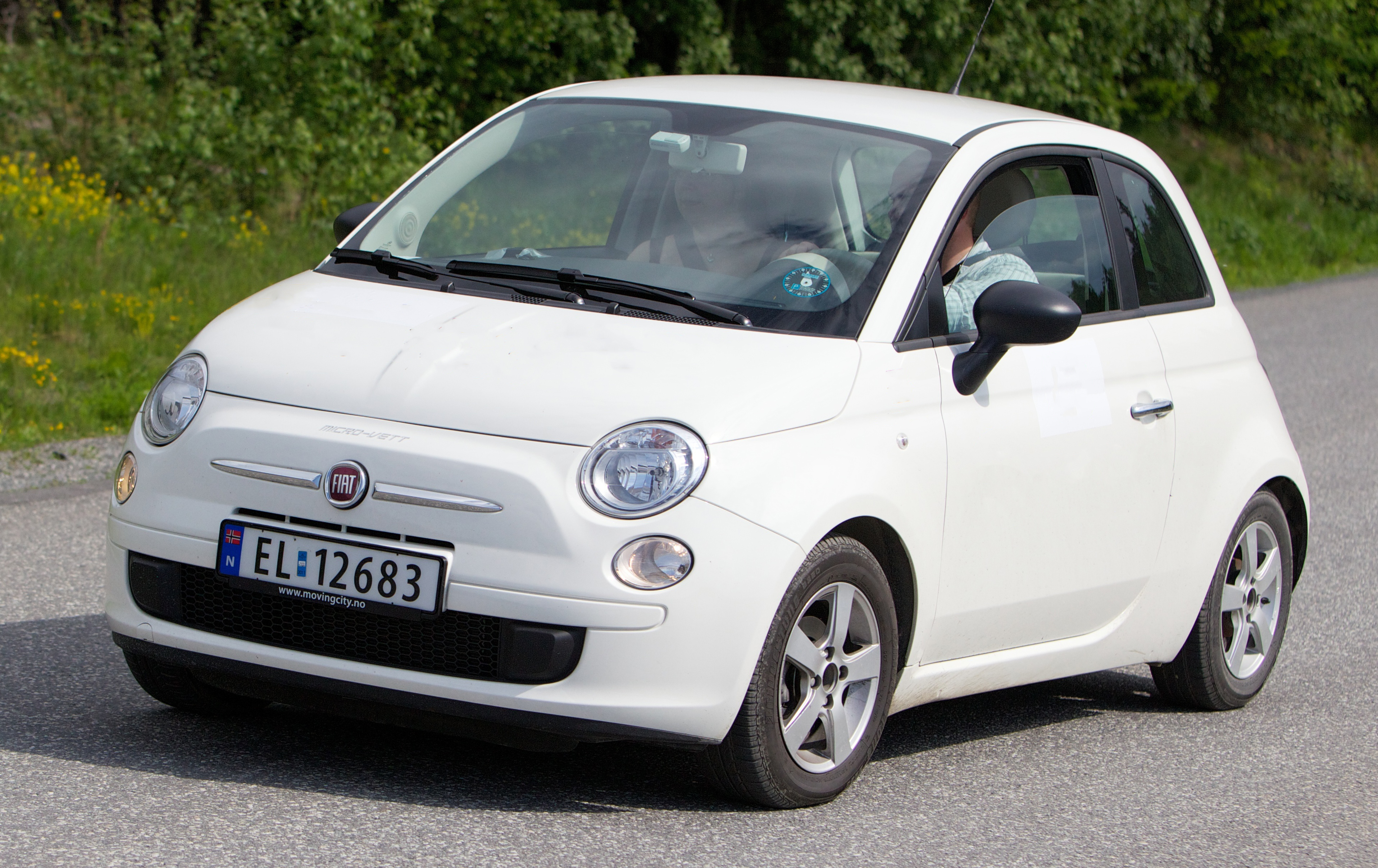
Fiat 500 Elettra BEV.

=== Fiat 500 EV ===
The Italian automaker gave Swedish company EV Adapt permission to buy the stock 500, swap out the combustion motor for an electric one, and then resell the car as an EV. The vehicle is now available throughout Europe. Buyers have the option of purchasing a battery-less car for a reduced price, and then renting its battery pack (in partnership with Alelion Batteries, all vehicles from EV Adapt are equipped with Lithium iron phosphate batteries). The range is 120 kilometres (75 mi) and the max speed is limited to 120 km/h (75 mph).

=== Fiat 500 Elettra (2010) ===
Chrysler unveiled the Fiat 500 Elettra concept electric car at the 2010 North American International Auto Show. The carmaker announced its decision to build an electric version of the 500 for the U.S. market, with a powertrain to be developed at its Auburn Hills, Michigan headquarters. Initially the electric car was scheduled go into production in 2012.

== Production and sales ==
Within three weeks of the 500's launch, the entire year's production of 58,000 had been sold out. While Italy has been the 500's main market (in October 2007, some 9,000 cars had been sold in Italy, making it the 3rd bestselling car there), the 500 has gained a strong following in many countries. Fiat France had received more than 10,000 orders by the end of October 2007. To cope with demand, Fiat has announced that production has been increased to 200,000 in 2008. The 500 was launched on 21 January 2008, in the UK. 500,000 500s have been produced up to March 2010.

By the end of 2013, the Fiat 500 had accumulated over 1 million sales in Europe. In 2013, the 500 outsold the Fiat Panda to become Europe's best-selling minicar for the first time since its launch.

In North America, initial sales were lower than anticipated, as of December 2011, only 16,000 500s were sold in North America, short of the initial goal of 50,000. Poor marketing and a shortage of dealers were blamed for the low numbers, Chrysler Group replaced North American head Laura Soave with Timothy Kuniskis, who was director of marketing for the Chrysler brand. The 1.5 million mark of sold FIAT 500s was reached in 2015. On March 22, 2021, the 2,500,000th Fiat 500 left the production line in Tychy, in Poland.

=== Sales ===
Year	United States	Canada	México	Europe	France	Italy	Germany	United Kingdom	Spain	Australia	Argentina	Japan	Brazil	Hungary	Austria	Switzerland	Luxembourg
2007				42,468	4,823	33,268											
2008			126	177,680	21,451	93,274			3,951	584		2,495					
2009			340	179,241	25,453	80,122			3,703	342		3,053	614				
2010			278	172,205	21,594	68,468		26,920	5,332	344		4,280	1,280				
2011	14,825		1,133	156,051	18,703	60,029		25,607	4,296	532		4,501	5,060				
2012	46,999	8,474	3,353	145,700	16,619	43,007		34,161	5,989	513	4,790	4,506	15,922				
2013	36,375	5,956	3,888	158,918	19,006	40,545		37,918	5,790	2,443	2,718	4,340	7,281				
2014	33,705	5,566	4,627	180,403	22,099	43,593		43,427	8,663	2,995	2,106	4,650	5,060				
2015	25,084	2,955	4,059	180,005	22,908	40,850		42,906	10,735	2,158	1,430	4,370	2,128				
2016	15,587	1,010	1,821	183,194	20,203	45,405		29,416	13,261	1,178	577	4,229	1,056				
2017	12,685	840	440	189,360	25,485	53,960		38,916	16,503	872	305	4,303	419				
2018	5,370	269	23	188,448	28,697	39,885		24,666	21,313	770	588		10				
2019	3,267	117	101	175,017	21,955	29,993			17,295	673	426						
2020	674	17	19	141,313	17,450	31,409			12,189	520	75						
2021	51			174,739		44,819			15,921				2	4,945	4,889	3,617	1,168
2022				179,863		33,966							202				
2023				112,567	32,420	32,981	47,166						51				
2024						30,761											

== Marketing ==
Presentation of Fiat 500 in Piazza Dei Signori in Vicenza. On this occasion, the new Fiat 500s were covered with a cloth resembling the old Fiat 500.

The launch show, which took place in the Turin's Murazzi del Po region, was a huge firework spectacle that also celebrated the 50th anniversary of the old 500 launch. The show was coordinated by Marco Balich, who was also responsible for Turin's 2006 Winter Olympic Games and was an event never made before for a car launch. Several artists performed during the show, including Lauryn Hill, Israel I dancing group Mayumana, and others. In the first part of the show, artists reproduced scenes of the 60s, such as scenes from films by Federico Fellini, a Beatles show made by a cover band and Marilyn Monroe's iconic "Happy Birthday, Mr. President", which became "Happy Birthday, dear Cinquecento" (sung by a Marilyn cover to celebrate the original 500's fifty years). Several bikes also represented the Giro d'Italia competition, filmed by a cameraman inside an original 500, just like in the 60s. Both the 500 and the bikes floated on the river.

The show was broadcast live by Italian Canale 5 and by a live video stream at fiat500.com, which was watched by over 100,000 people online.

=== "500 wants you" ===
A project called "500 wants you" was launched by Fiat as part of a major online advertising campaign. The project uses the Internet to involve the public in planning the evolution of the new vehicle. The official 500 Internet page has been visited by over four million people.

=== Black bear/Black panther ===
Print ads titled Black bear and Black panther were produced Leo Burnett agency for French market. The ads were premiered in September 2010.

=== Fiat 500 Cinema Challenge ===
As part of the Fiat 500C launch in Germany, an interactive game event was held inside a movie theatre. Theatre attendants would find steering hands with a coupon that allows the attendant to win a weekend driving a Fiat 500C. Attendants played the interactive game by trying to collectively drive two on-screen Fiat 500C cars around a uniquely designed race track.

The campaign was produced by the Leo Burnett agency.

=== Fiat 500 hand dryer ===
To demonstrate Fiat's Start & Stop system, Leo Burnett, Frankfurt developed the Fiat 500 hand dryer to promote its eco-friendly image.

=== 500 by Gucci ===
As part of the 500 by Gucci product launch, a commercial featuring model Natasha Poly was produced. The commercial was shot by Mert Alas and Marcus Piggott in Rome, and conceived by Giannini. In addition, single and double-page print ads were also produced.

==== 500 by Gucci short film collection ====
This is a series of five short films starring the 500 by Gucci. The films were premiered at the Independent Ideas headquarters in Milan, during a special event for a select audience of international journalists and opinion leaders, in the presence of Lapo Elkann.

=== North American launch campaign ===
A tagline 'Simply More' was used to define 'The Fiat 500 as everything you need and nothing you don't. It represents the notion that the simple things in life are treasures, alongside the thought that the richness and fullness of a life well-lived is defined by one's view of self-expression.'

In the 'Life Is Best When Driven' campaign, Jennifer Lopez was featured in the "My World" ad. The Smoking Gun reported the Big Block-produced commercial was shot in Los Angeles, and a body-double was used for the scenes showing the car driving through Lopez' 'hometown of the Bronx'. Following the production of the ad, the artists behind a copyrighted mural in the Bronx sued Chrysler for using the image in the commercial without their permission, which was later settled out of court in undisclosed terms. Jennifer Lopez later appeared in 2011 American Music Awards with a 2012 Fiat 500 during her performance of "Papi", a 30 and 60-second versions of Fiat 500 Pop commercial, and the Fiat 500C Gucci Edition ad titled 'Elegance'.

In the 500 Abarth 'Seduction' ad, Jennifer Lopez was replaced by Romanian model Catrinel Menghia. A Pop-Up Video version of the ad was also produced.

Another Fiat 500 TV commercial titled 'Liberation' debuted at the 2012 Golden Globes Award Show.

A new Fiat 500 Abarth TV commercial starring Charlie Sheen and Catrinel Menghia debuted during the 2012 NCAA Tournament.

=== Abarth 595 '50th Anniversary' ===
A series of commercial activities across the Abarth range were launched for the Abarth 595 '50th Anniversary', including a digital communication plan revolving around a commercial: the essence of the Abarth brand concentrated in 5.95 seconds through slow motion. It was also celebrated through the first digital "rally" and an app for iPhone, iPad, Android, and Facebook through which fans can "play" tunes by substituting the musical notes with the sounds of the Abarth engines.

=== 2014 Fiat 500c GQ Edition ===
As part of the 2014 Fiat 500c GQ Edition launch, the FIAT brand sponsored the 'How GQ Are You?' online photo-sharing platform, where participants can upload photos of themselves to compete in online style contests, with winning participants awarded monthly prizes, culminating in December with the give-away of one Fiat 500c GQ Edition to the 'Most GQ Guy of the Year,' chosen by the public and the editors of GQ Magazine.

== Awards ==
In 2011 the TwinAir engine used in the 500 was awarded with four awards in the International Engine of the Year competition.

- What Car? readers' affections 2007
- Car: Car of the Year 2007
- EuroCarBody 2007 award
- European Car of the Year for 2008
- The World's Most Beautiful Automobile (City Car and Small Car category)
- AUTO EUROPA 2008
- Fifth Gear: Best Small Car 2007
- Top Gear: Best 'City Car' 2007
- Auto 1 Europa 2008 – (Auto Bild)
- 2008 What Car? Green Car of the Year Award
- Auto Express: "Best City Car" 2008
- evecars.com Best Supermini/City Car Award 2008
- evecars.com readers Sexiest Manbag type Car of 2008
- Best Compact Car Consumers' Choice Award-Car of the Year in Japan
- 2009 World Car Design of the Year
- Auto Express: "Best City Car" 2009
- 2010 What Car? Green Car of the year supermini category
- First place in the 2011 J.D. Power & Associates "Vehicle Owner Satisfaction Study" (conducted in Germany).
- Best City Car in the 2011 Fleet World Honours.
- Men's Journal: "Gear of the Year" award, 2011 Vehicle category (U.S. version).

In 2009, an art installation designed by architect Fabio Novembre featured 20 full-size fibreglass replicas of the Fiat 500C, shaped as planters, along Milan's famous Via Monte Napoleone.

== See also ==
- Fiat 500
- Fiat 500L
- Fiat 500X
