= Uptown =

Uptown may refer to:

== Neighborhoods or regions in several cities ==
=== United States ===
- Uptown, Chicago, Illinois
- Uptown Manhattan, New York City, New York
- Uptown, Richmond, Virginia
- Uptown, Dallas, Texas
- Uptown, Harrisburg, Pennsylvania
- Uptown, Hartford, Connecticut
- Uptown Houston, Texas
- Uptown Charlotte, North Carolina
- Uptown Kingston, New York
- Uptown Lexington, Kentucky
- Uptown, Memphis, Tennessee
- Uptown, Minneapolis, Minnesota, area surrounding Hennepin Avenue at Lake Street
- Uptown New Orleans, Louisiana
  - Uptown, New Orleans, a neighborhood
- Uptown Oakland, California
- Uptown Pittsburgh, Pennsylvania, also known as The Bluff
- Uptown, Seattle, Washington, also known as Lower Queen Anne, Seattle
- Uptown Tampa, Florida
- Uptown, Wichita, Kansas
- Buckhead, Atlanta, Georgia, North of Midtown and Downtown
- Uptown, entertainment district east of Downtown and Midtown Albuquerque, New Mexico
- Uptown, area surrounding the University of Cincinnati in Cincinnati, Ohio

=== Canada ===
- Uptown Toronto, Ontario
- Uptown, Montreal, Quebec (see Golden Square Mile)
- Uptown, Saint John, New Brunswick
- Uptown Waterloo, Ontario
- Uptown Port Alberni, British Columbia
- Uptown, Victoria, British Columbia
- Uptown, New Westminster, British Columbia

== Music ==
- Uptown (band), Korean hip hop and R&B group
- Uptown (Billy Taylor album), 1960
- Uptown (André Previn album), 1990
- Uptown (Machinations album), 1988
- "Uptown", a 1960 song by Roy Orbison
- "Uptown" (The Crystals song), 1962
- "Uptown" (The Chambers Brothers song), 1967
- "Uptown" (Prince song), 1980
- "Uptown", 2009 song by Drake from his So Far Gone mixtape
- "Uptown", 2013 song by Travis Scott from his mixtape Owl Pharaoh
- Uptown Records, American hip hop/R&B record label
- Uptown Records (jazz), American Jazz record label

== Buildings ==
- Hochhaus Uptown München, a skyscraper in Munich, Germany
- SM City CDO Uptown, a shopping mall in Cagayan de Oro, Philippines
- Uptown, Brisbane, a shopping centre in Brisbane, Queensland, Australia
- Uptown Theatres in various cities

== Media ==
- Uptown (1987 film), Spanish film
- Uptown (2009 film), American independent drama film written and directed by Brian Ackley
- Uptown (newspaper), alternative weekly in Winnipeg, Manitoba, Canada

== See also ==
- "Uptown Funk", 2014 song by Bruno Mars
- "Uptown Girl", 1983 song by Billy Joel
- Downtown (disambiguation)
- Midtown (disambiguation)
