= Downtown (disambiguation) =

Downtown is the American term for the central business district of a city.

Downtown or Down Town may also refer to:

== Places ==
=== Philippines ===
- SM CDO Downtown, a shopping mall in Cagayan de Oro, Philippines

=== Singapore ===
- Downtown Core, a planning area of Singapore

=== South Korea ===
- Downtown Seoul, an original city center of Seoul, South Korea

=== Poland ===
- Downtown, Warsaw, a city district of Warsaw, Poland
  - North Downtown, Warsaw, a neighbourhood in Warsaw, Poland
  - South Downtown, Warsaw, a neighbourhood in Warsaw, Poland
  - Mier Park (also known as Downtown Park), an urban park in Warsaw, Poland

=== United Kingdom ===
- Downtown, Rotherhithe, an area in London

=== United States ===
- Downtown Atlanta
  - South Downtown, Atlanta, a neighbourhood in Atlanta, Georgia, United States
- Downtown (Nevada gaming area), a neighborhood of Las Vegas
  - Downtown Las Vegas
- Downtown Brooklyn, neighborhood and civic center in Brooklyn, New York City and is home to the MetroTech Center, the Williamsburgh Savings Bank Tower and Barclays Center, home to the Brooklyn Nets of the National Basketball Association
- Downtown Manhattan, referred to as Lower Manhattan in New York City and is home to the Financial District and One World Trade Center
- Downtown (Washington, D.C.), a neighborhood of Washington, D.C.

== Film and television ==
- Downtown (film), a 1990 American comedy
- Downtown: A Street Tale, a 2004 American drama film
- Downtown (1986 TV series), an American crime drama
- Downtown (1999 TV series), an American animated series
- "Downtown" (American Dad!), a 2020 TV episode

== Music ==
=== Albums ===
- Downtown (Marshall Crenshaw album), 1985
- Downtown (Petula Clark album) or the title song (see below), 1965
- Downtown: Life Under the Gun, an EP by August Alsina, or the title song, 2013

=== Songs ===
- "Downtown" (Anitta and J Balvin song), 2017
- "Downtown" (Crazy Horse song), or "Come On Baby Let's Go Downtown", 1971
- "Downtown" (Kids of 88 song), 2010
- "Downtown" (Lady Antebellum song), 2013
- "Downtown" (Lloyd Cole song), 1990
- "Downtown" (Macklemore & Ryan Lewis song), 2015
- "Downtown" (Neil Young song), 1995
- "Downtown" (Peaches song), 2006
- "Downtown" (Petula Clark song), written by Tony Hatch, 1964
- "Down Town", by the Justified Ancients of Mu Mu, 1987
- "Down Town" / "Yasashisa ni Tsutsumareta Nara", by Maaya Sakamoto, covering the 1975 song by Sugar Babe (see below), 2010
- "Down Town", by Gen Hoshino from Yellow Dancer, 2015
- "Downtown", by Eraserheads from Sticker Happy, 1997
- "Downtown", by Gotthard from Gotthard, 1992
- "Downtown", by Icona Pop from Icona Pop, 2012
- "Downtown", by Kep1er from Troubleshooter, 2022
- "Downtown", by Majical Cloudz from Are You Alone?, 2015
- "Downtown", by One 2 Many, 1988
- "Downtown", by Orson from Bright Idea, 2006
- "Downtown", by SWV from It's About Time, 1993
- "Downtown", by Toh Kay from You By Me: Vol. 1, 2010
- "Down Town", by Sugar Babe, a band featuring Tatsuro Yamashita, 1975
- "Skid Row (Downtown)", from the musical Little Shop of Horrors, 1982

=== Other ===
- Downtown music, a category of American music that originated in downtown Manhattan in the 1960s
- Downtown Music Holdings, a global independent rights management and music services company
- Downtown Radio, a radio station based in Northern Ireland
- Downtown Records, an American record label

== People ==
- Fred Brown (basketball) (born 1948), American basketball player
- Downtown Julie Brown (born 1963), English-born actress, DJ and VJ
- Downtown (comedy duo), the Japanese comedy duo of Masatoshi Hamada and Hitoshi Matsumoto

== Transportation ==
- Downtown Line, a mass transit line in Singapore
  - Downtown MRT station, a station on the Downtown line
- Kuloloia station, also known as Downtown station, a planned Skyline light metro station in Honolulu, Hawaiʻi
- Downtown station (Capital MetroRail), Austin, Texas
- Fiat Downtown, a concept car

== Other uses ==
- Downtown (G.I. Joe), a fictional character in the G.I. Joe universe
- Downtown Hotel, Dawson City, Yukon, Canada
- Down Town (magazine), a Greek weekly
- Downtown, in basketball terminology, the area of the court beyond the three-point line
- Downtown, a subgroup of the organized Ultras group Horde Zla
- Downtown, a 1994 novel by Anne Rivers Siddons
- Downtown, a 1990 novel by Ed McBain

== See also ==
- Downton (disambiguation)
- Midtown (disambiguation)
- Uptown (disambiguation)
