= Midtown Tunnel =

The Midtown Tunnel may refer to:

- Queens-Midtown Tunnel, a tunnel in New York City linking the boroughs of Queens and Manhattan
- Midtown Tunnel (Virginia), a tunnel in Virginia linking the cities of Portsmouth and Norfolk

== See also ==
- Midtown (disambiguation)
- Tunnel (disambiguation)
