= Frank Stephenson =

Spanish-American car designer (born 1959)

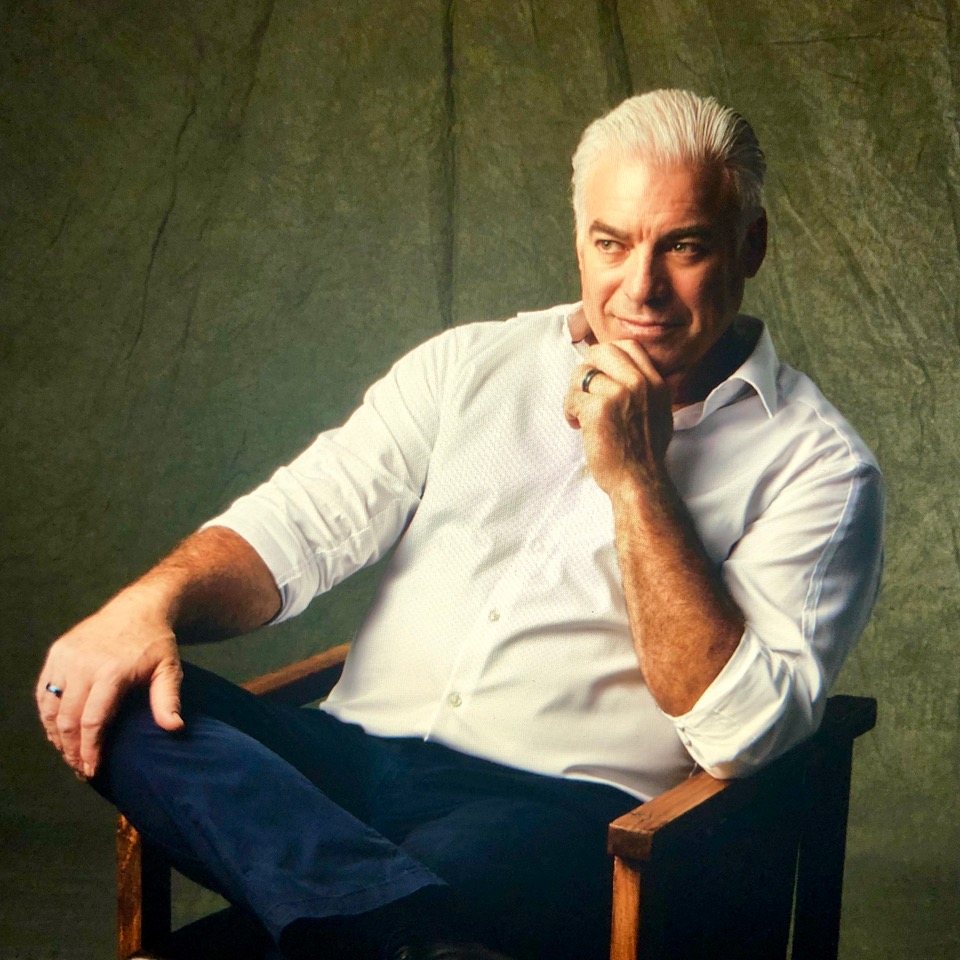
- Stephenson in 2018
- Born: 3 October 1959 (age 67); Casablanca, Morocco
- Education: Art Center College of Design
- Occupation: Industrial Designer
- Known for: Design work at BMW, Mini, Fiat, Ferrari and McLaren

Frank Stephenson (STEFF-en-sən; born 3 October 1959) is a Moroccan-born Spanish-American automobile designer who has worked for Ford, BMW, Mini, Ferrari, Maserati, Fiat, Lancia, Alfa Romeo, and McLaren. He is best known for redesigning the Mini as the Mini Hatch.

Motor Trend magazine has called him "one of the most influential automotive designers of our time". Stephenson has created a YouTube channel under his name, his first video series being the "How I Designed..." series in April 2020; as of October 2026, his channel has gained nearly 250,000 subscribers and over 17,000,000 views.

== Background ==
Stephenson was born and raised in Casablanca, Morocco to a Norwegian father and a Spanish mother on 3 October 1959. At the age of 11, his family moved to Istanbul, Turkey followed by two years in Madrid, Spain, where he graduated from high school. After high school, Stephenson spent six years competing professionally in motocross. His passion for drawing and automobiles since his youth led him to study automotive design at ArtCenter College of Design in Pasadena, California from 1982 to 1986.

Stephenson has been the director of design for Mini, Ferrari, Maserati, Fiat, Lancia, Alfa Romeo, and McLaren before moving on to Lilium Aviation to lead the design team creating eVTOL taxi aircraft, as well as being a Design Master at Suning Intelligent Technology, a major Chinese technology company. Additionally, he is the design director of Frank Stephenson Design, his independent UK-based design studio that designs and collaborates with companies worldwide. Stephenson speaks English, Italian, German, and Spanish fluently and is an international speaker on many design-related and motivational subjects. He has also been listed in Debrett's People of Today since 2010.

In 2019, a film documentary about his work and career titled Chasing Perfect, produced by Lionsgate and Salon Pictures and directed by Helena Coan, was released globally.

== Career ==
Stephenson's design career spans several of Europe's best-known automotive companies. He began at Ford's design studio in Cologne, Germany, where he was asked to submit designs for some distinctive features on the Ford Escort RS Cosworth. While Steve Harper "did the bulk of the design", Stephenson proposed an innovative, third functional spoiler that did not make it into production. He later moved to BMW where he spent 11 years, eventually leading to an appointment as Chief Designer. His design of the new Mini Cooper, launched at the Paris Motor Show in 2000, led to the award-winning rebirth of the brand and a new generation of Mini models. In 2003, the Cooper was the first European car to win the North American Car of the Year award in 2003. Also while at BMW, Stephenson designed the first BMW SUV, the BMW X5 (E53).

In July 2002, Stephenson was appointed the first Director of Ferrari-Maserati Concept Design and Development in Maranello and Modena, Italy. His work with this department included the design of the Maserati GranSport, Maserati MC12, Ferrari FXX, and Ferrari F430. His work with this department included the design of Pininfarina's work on the Maserati Quattroporte, Maserati GranTurismo and Ferrari 612 Scaglietti. Stephenson's success with the Ferrari and Maserati designs led to his appointment as head of Fiat, Lancia, and the Commercial Vehicle Styling Centre in Turin in 2006. He was tasked with rebuilding the struggling Fiat brand, where he directed the styling of the Punto and Bravo and translated Roberto Giolito's 2004 Fiat Trepiùno concept into the production 500, Punto and Bravo. In 2007 he was made Head of Centro Stile Alfa Romeo design.

Stephenson left the Italian group in April 2008 to become design director at McLaren Automotive, where he created a new design language and oversaw the design of the MP4-12C, P1, 675LT, 570S and 720S. While at McLaren he drew inspiration for the P1 partially from a sailfish that he saw when on holiday in Miami.

Stephenson left McLaren Automotive in 2017 and was rumoured to make a return to the BMW Group to head the design team at Mini. The rumours turned out to be unfounded; upon leaving McLaren, Stephenson founded his own design studio, Frank Stephenson Design Consultancy. From May 2018 to November 2019, Stephenson was head of product design at the German aviation company Lilium and Design Master of Suning Smart Technology. Stephenson continues to work on many different cross-industry design projects, products and design solutions.

[21] On September 21, 2026, it was announced that Frank Stephenson Design was in charge of designing the Runabout Pickup Truck/SUV for Reo Motors in an email to its reservation holders. It was subsequently announced on the Reo website.

Cars designed/assisted by Stephenson
Company	Brand	Model	Role
Ford	Ford	Escort RS Cosworth	Designer
BMW	BMW	X5 (E53)	Designer
BMW	MINI	Mini Hatch	Designer
Ferrari and Maserati	Ferrari	F430	Designer
Ferrari and Maserati	Maserati	MC12	Designer
Ferrari and Maserati	Ferrari	FXX	Designer
Ferrari and Maserati	Maserati	GranSport	Designer
Ferrari and Maserati	Maserati	Quattroporte	Assistant
Ferrari and Maserati	Maserati	GranTurismo	Assistant
Ferrari and Maserati	Ferrari	612 Scaglietti	Assistant
Ferrari and Maserati	Ferrari	599 Fiorano	Assistant
Fiat and Lancia	Fiat	500	Designer
Fiat and Lancia	Fiat	Punto	Assistant
Fiat and Lancia	Fiat	Bravo	Assistant
McLaren	McLaren	MP4-12C	Designer
McLaren	McLaren	P1	Designer
McLaren	McLaren	675LT	Designer
McLaren	McLaren	570S	Designer
McLaren	McLaren	720S	Designer

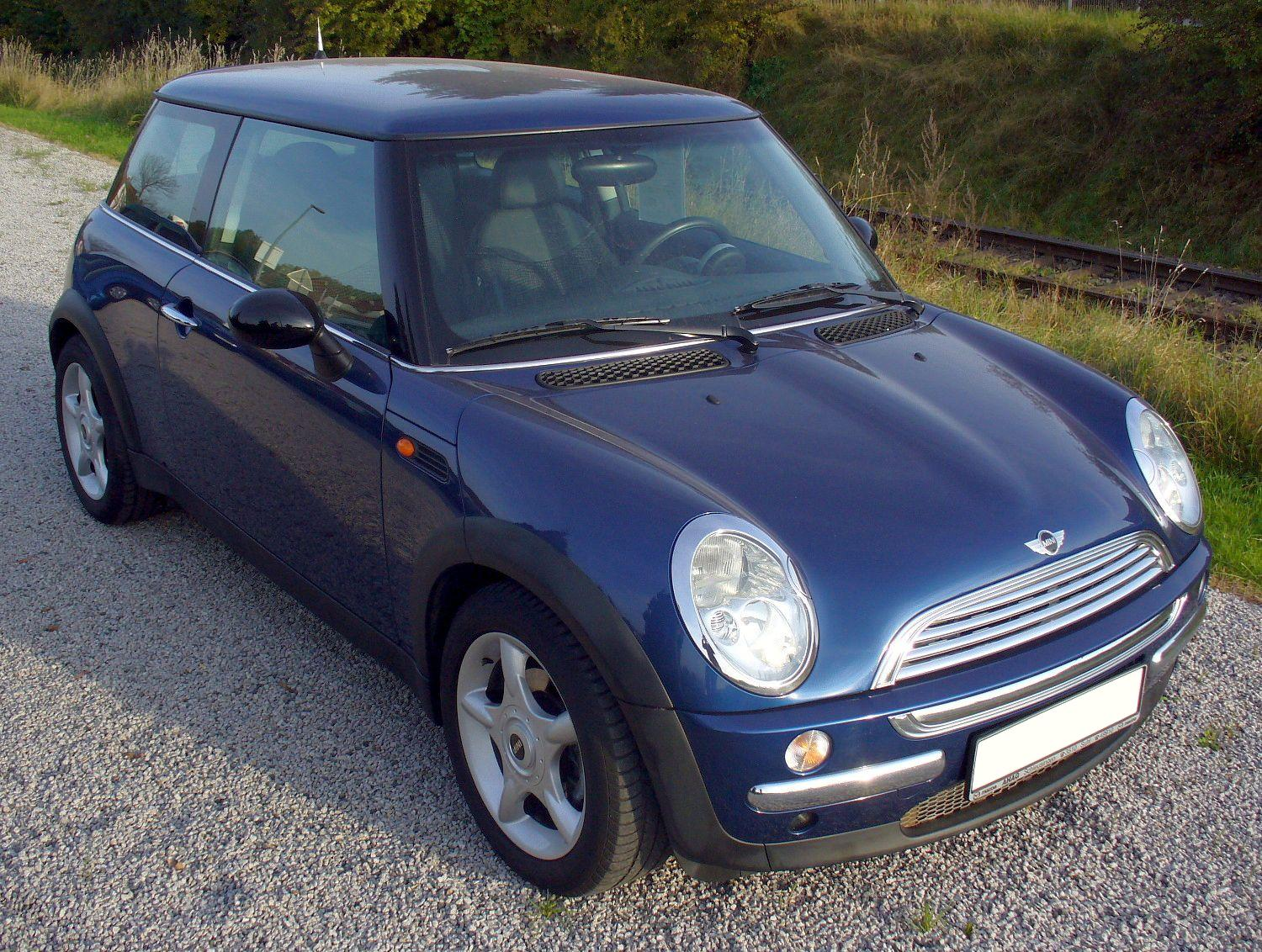
Mini Hatch

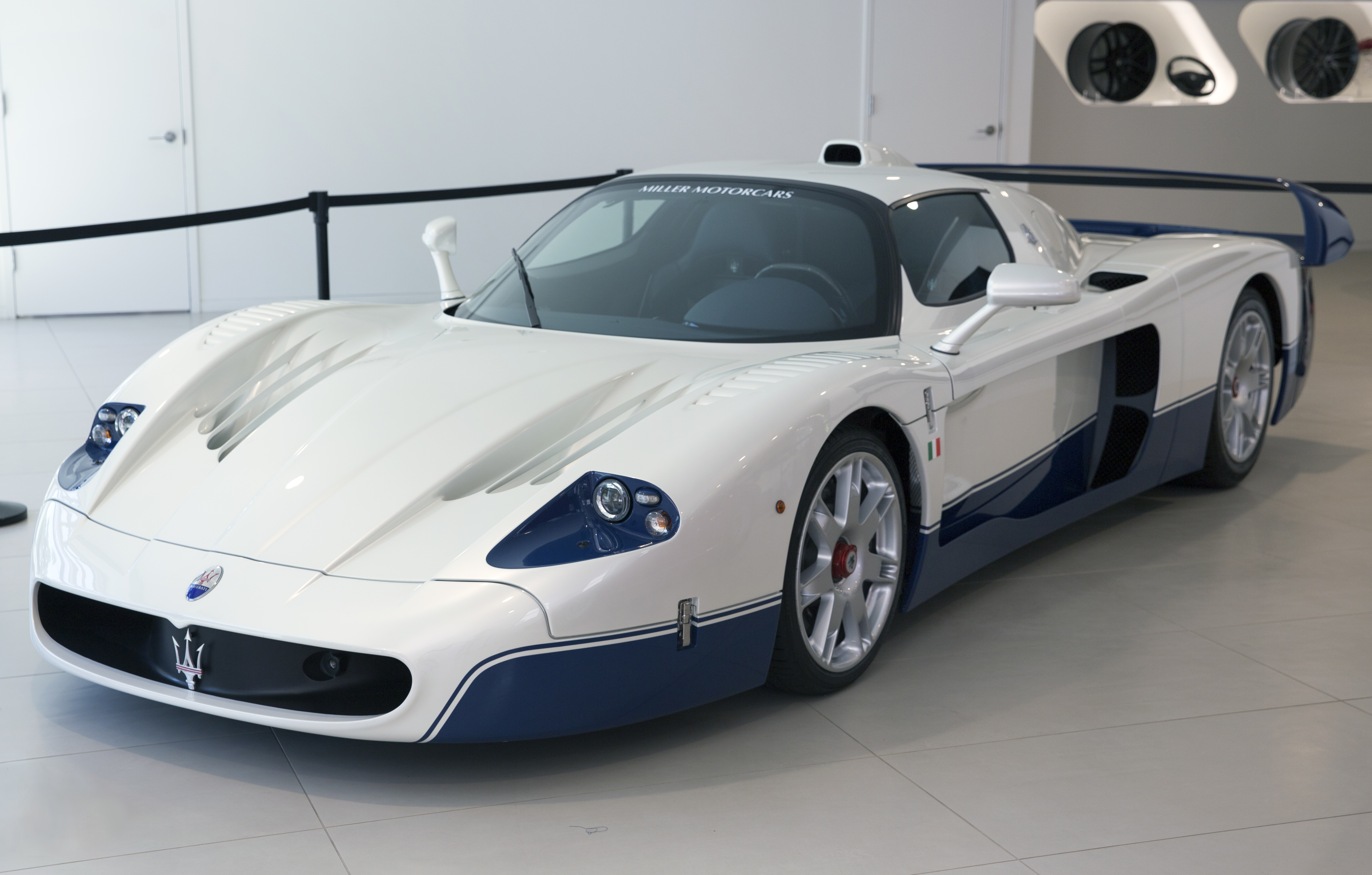
Maserati MC12

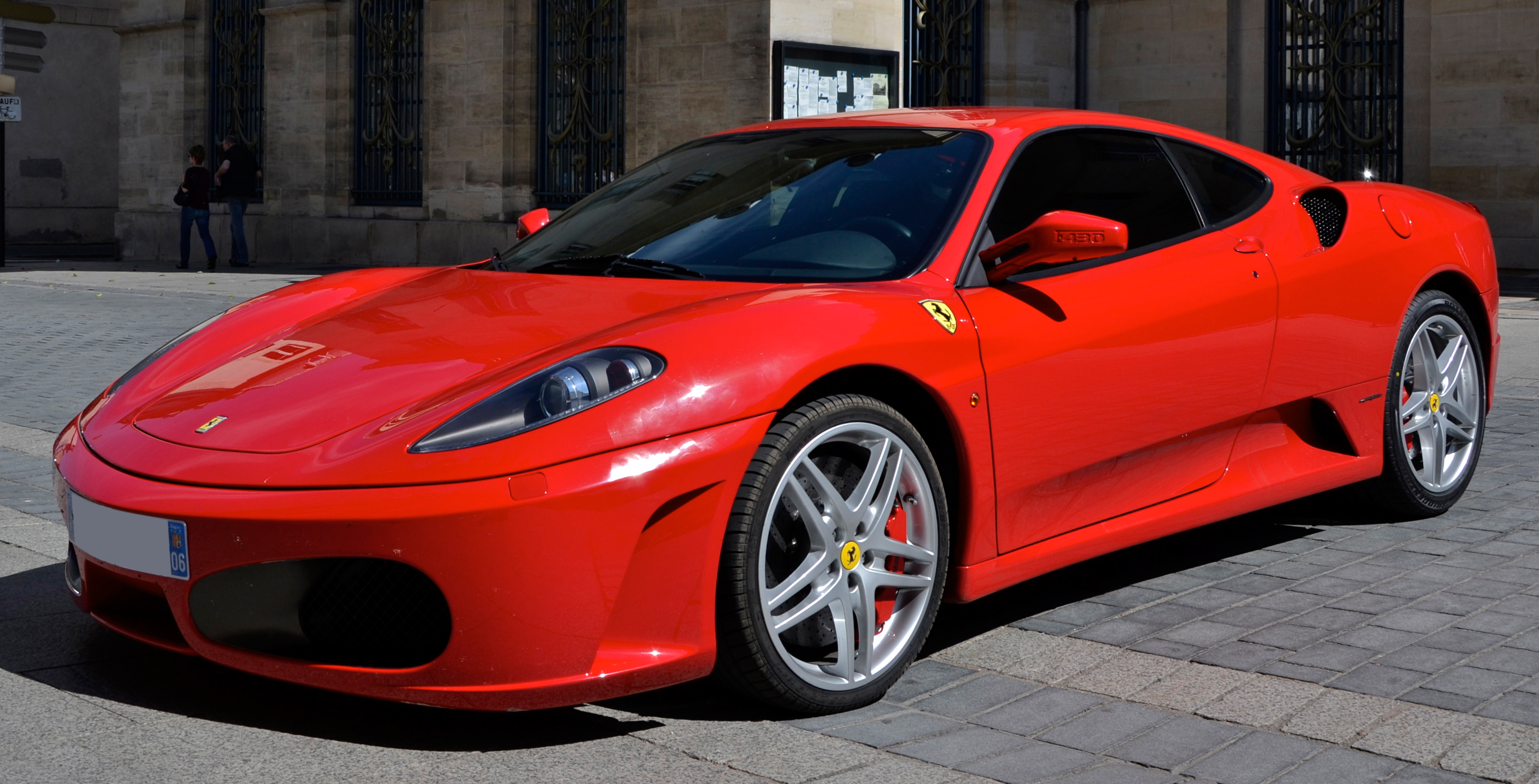
Ferrari F430

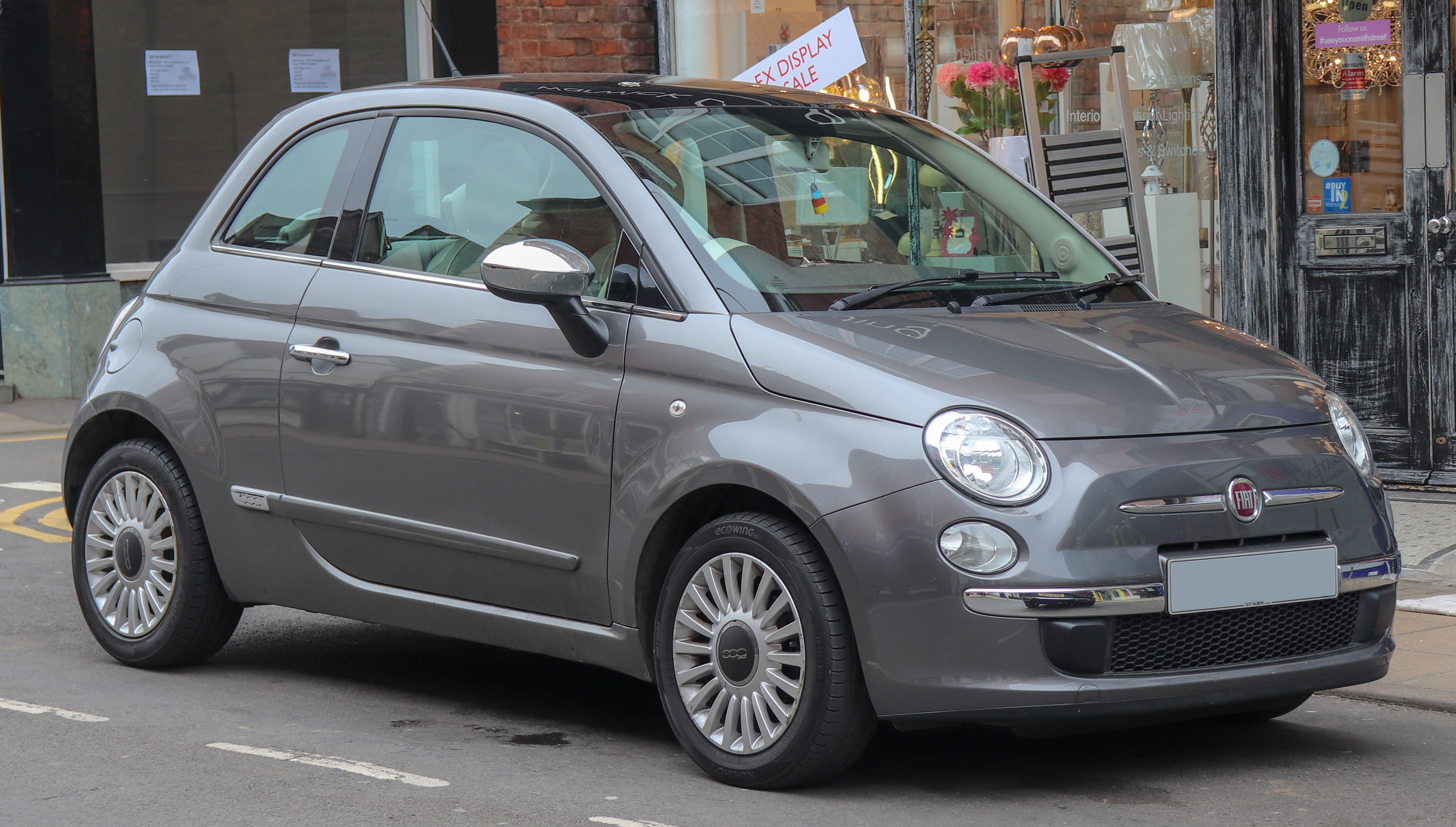
Fiat 500

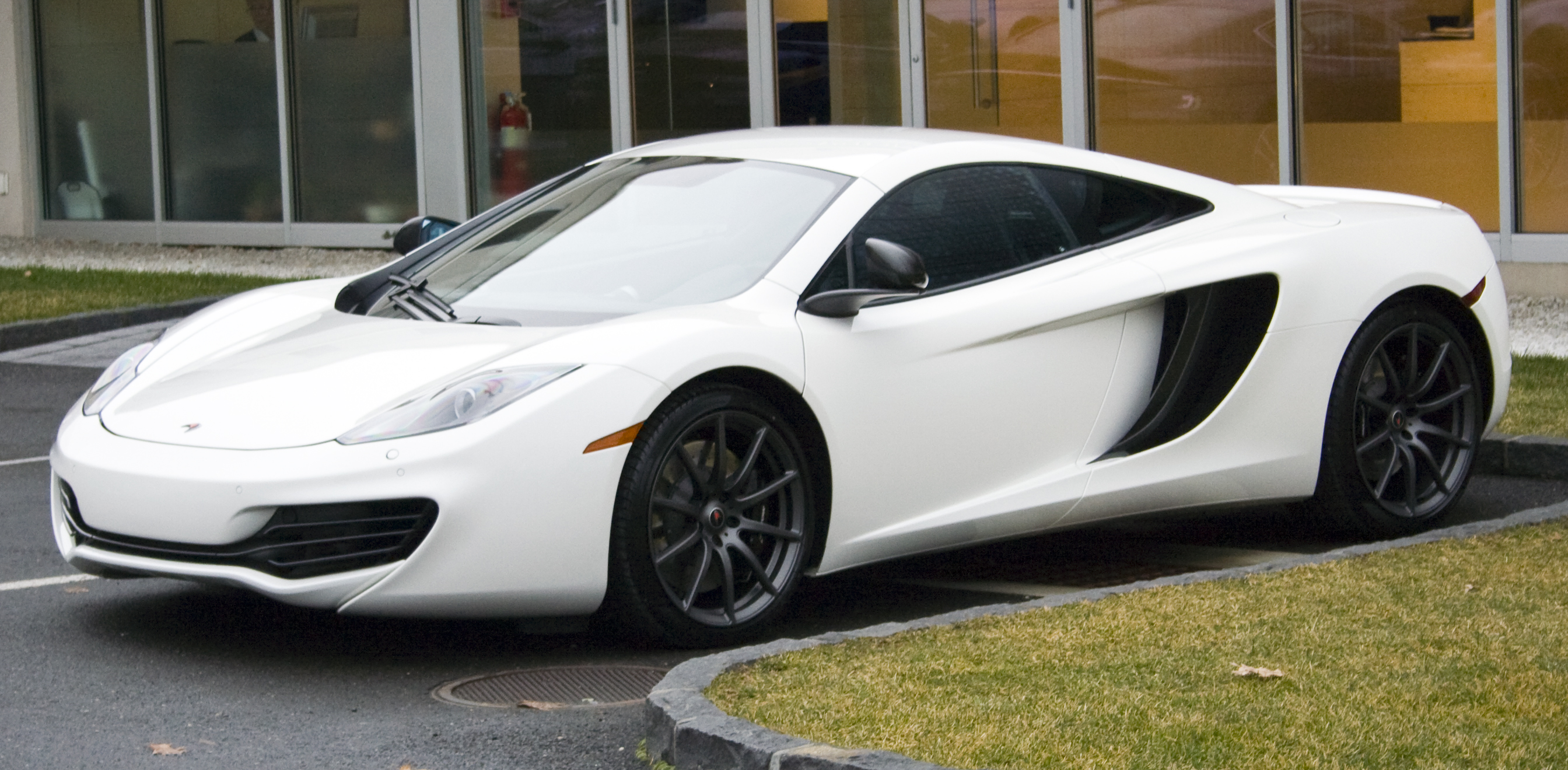
McLaren MP4-12C

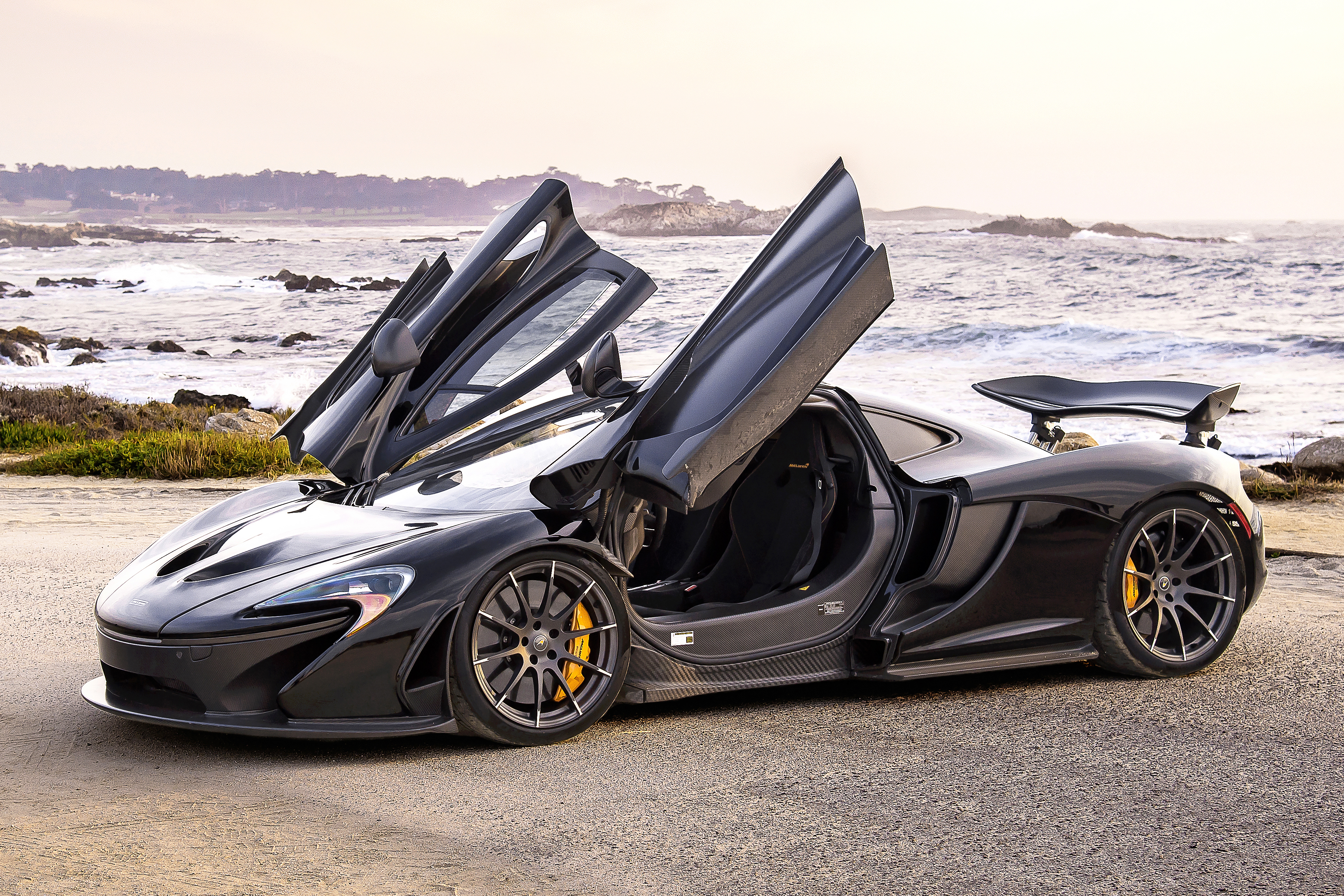
McLaren P1

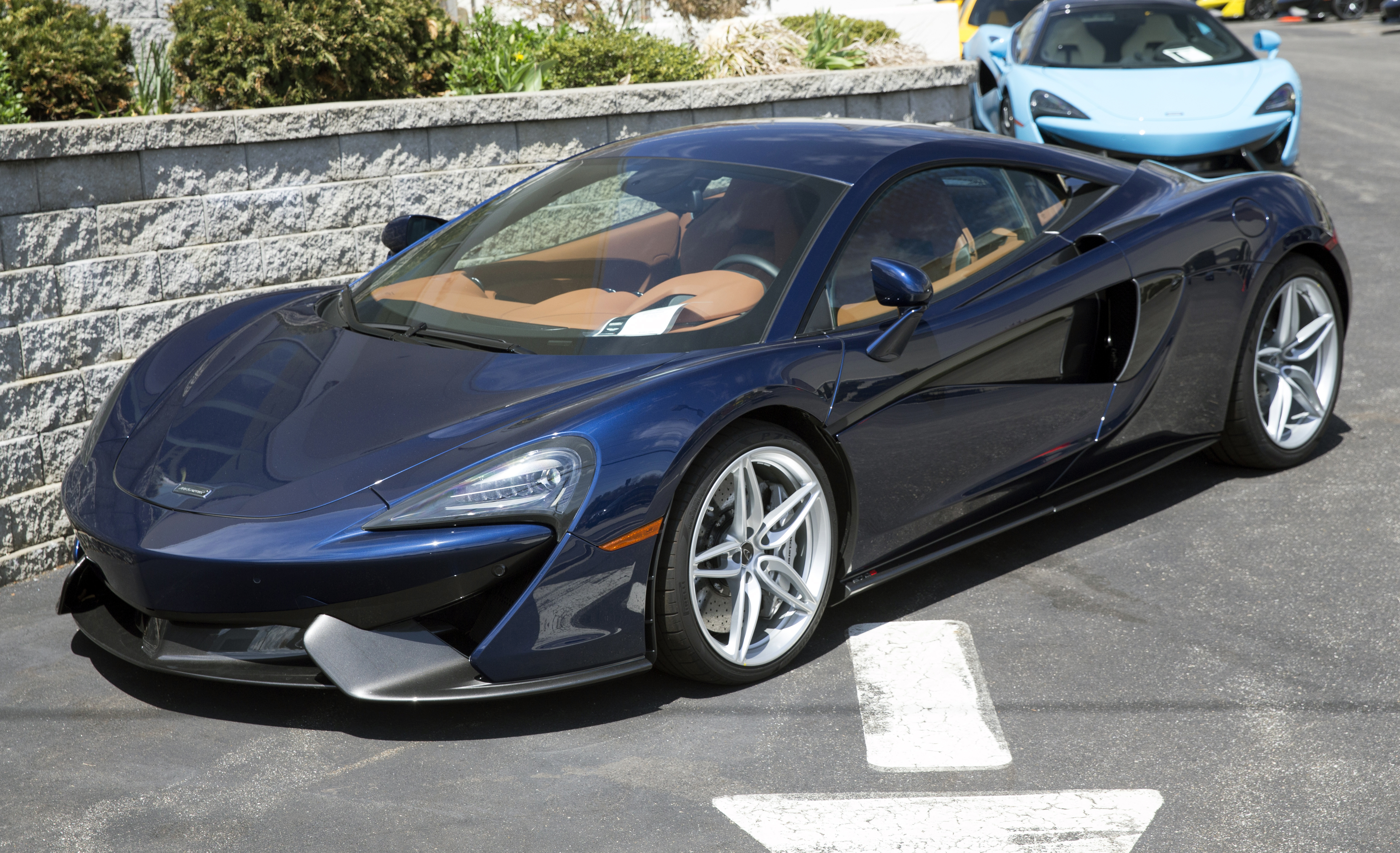
McLaren 570S

=== Design style ===
Stephenson says that he looks everywhere for inspiration and is always sketching. He adds that just walking down the street one can find inspiration from so many things. Stephenson also says that he looks to the animal kingdom for design, adopting what's termed biomimicry for his design inspiration. His stated goal is to "find the principles in nature that make organisms be successful in their environment".

Stephenson's design process progresses from a sketch pad to computer graphics, then clay models, and finally to prototype models. He says the advantage of working with clay models is that you can see and feel the designed surfaces in three dimensions, embedding the product with the human touch. He credits curiosity, research, and innovation as key drivers to his design values.
