= South Downtown =

South Downtown may also refer to:

- South Downtown, Atlanta, Georgia, United States
- South Downtown, Warsaw, Poland
- Downtown South, a proposed real estate development in Raleigh, North Carolina, United States

== See also ==
- Downton (disambiguation)
