= FCA Heritage =

Historical legacy department of Stellantis

Heritage
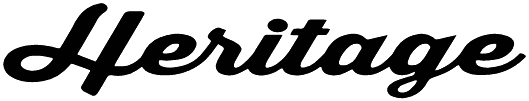
- Formerly: FCA Heritage
- Type: Subsidiary
- Founded: 2015; 11 years ago
- Headquarters: Turin, Italy
- Key people: Roberto Giolito
- Brands: List: Alfa Romeo; Fiat; Lancia; Abarth
- Parent: Stellantis Europe S.p.A.
- Website: fcaheritage.com

Stellantis Heritage (formerly FCA Heritage) is a department established to protect and promote the historic legacy –both automotive and archival– of the Italian brands Alfa Romeo, Fiat, Lancia and Abarth. It was founded in Torino in 2015 to coordinate all the activities which, up to that moment, had been conducted individually by the brands to promote their historical and cultural heritage.

== History ==
In the 1960s and 1970s, several Italian automotive manufacturers (that later merged into the FCA Group) launched programmes to protect and promote their historical heritage, which led to the opening of the Centro Storico Fiat (Fiat Historical Center) in Turin in 1963 and, later, of the Lancia Museum in 1971. The Museo Storico Alfa Romeo opened in Arese a few years later, in 1976. Both the Alfa Romeo Museum and the Centro Storico Fiat are still in operation and house the automotive collections and historical production records of their respective brands, in addition to archival collections which include technical drawings and designs, advertising materials, financial and industrial documentation, films and images.

In the same years, Fiat acquired Autobianchi in 1968, Ferrari and Lancia in 1969, Abarth in 1971, Alfa Romeo in 1986, and finally Innocenti and Maserati in 1990. The Lancia Museum, located in Borgo San Paolo in Turin closed in 1993 and the cars of its collection were transferred to an industrial building belonging to the Fiat Group in Beinasco.

Abarth was relaunched in the 2000s. The operational autonomy of the brand was supported by an operation aimed at taking advantage of its historical heritage. The collection of the brands's record-breaking and rally racing cars was put on display in the new Abarth headquarters, located in the industrial hub of Mirafiori. Certification and restoration services dedicated to the vintage cars of the brand were activated in parallel.

Fiat S.p.A. and Chrysler Group in 2014 merged to become FCA and FCA Heritage was founded the following year to expand the Abarth experience to the Alfa Romeo, Fiat and Lancia brands. Roberto Giolito was named head of FCA Heritage. The automotive designer had led the Centro Stile Fiat (FCA EMEA Design Center) and is the creator of Fiat Multipla and Fiat 500.

== Location ==
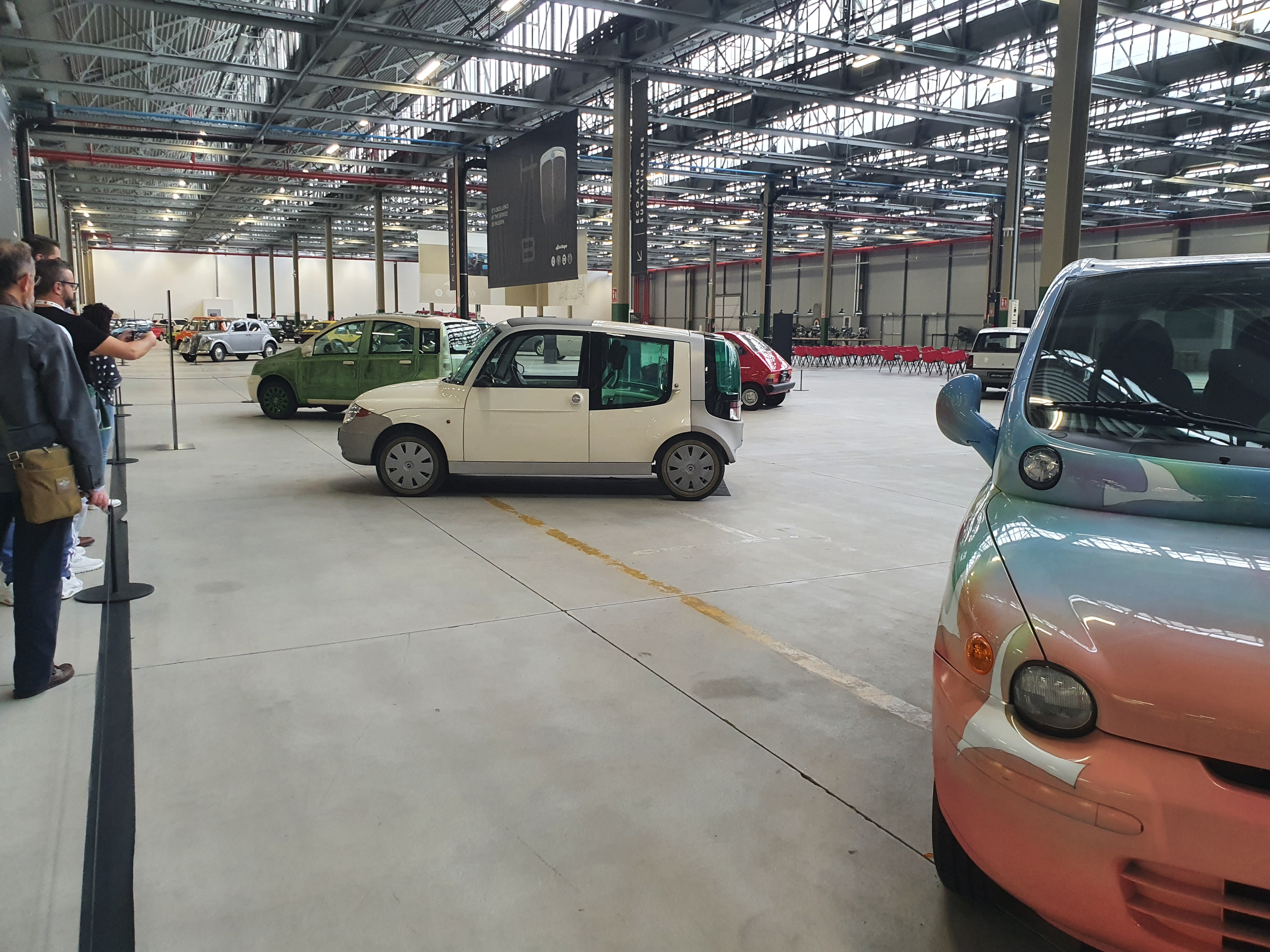
Fiat ecobasic5 concept in the exhibition hall

In 2019, the department opened its operational headquarters, the "Heritage HUB". The multi-functional space is located in a former Fiat mechanical workshop in the Mirafiori plant called Officina 81.

The 15,000 square metre surface area of the building houses staff offices, a central area dedicated to meetings and workshops, the classic car sales service showroom, an exhibition celebrating the 80th anniversary of the Mirafiori plant and a selection of the company's collection of vintage cars consisting of more than 300 models mostly made by Fiat and Abarth and, to a lesser extent, by Alfa Romeo, in addition to the entire Lancia collection previously kept in Beinasco. Of the 300 cars on display in the Heritage Hub, 64 feature in eight thematic areas with eight models each.

In addition to the over 300 cars at the Hub, the FCA Heritage collection includes some 30 vintage Fiat cars on display in the Centro Storico Fiat and more than 250 Alfa Romeo cars kept in the Alfa Romeo Museum in Arese.

== Activities and services ==
FCA Heritage works to protect the historical heritage of the brands of the group by periodically restoring and maintaining the cars in the company's collection.

FCA Heritage has listed and mapped all the official Alfa Romeo, Fiat, Lancia and Abarth clubs and takes part in international exhibitions dedicated to vintage cars in official capacity, including Concours d'Elegance, rallies, classic car gatherings and specialised motor shows, such as Goodwood Festival of Speed, Rétromobile, the Geneva Motor Show, Mille Miglia, the Cesana-Sestriere rally and Targa Florio.

FCA Heritage donated a Fiat 500 F to the MOMA in New York and has established relationships with the Victoria and Albert Museum in London, the Triennale Design Museum in Milan, the Musée National de la Voiture in Compiègne and the Technik Museum in Sinsheim which in 2019 dedicated the opening exhibition of its new display area to the history of Alfa Romeo.

A number of services are offered to Alfa Romeo, Fiat, Lancia and Abarth classic car owners, including certification of authenticity, certificate of origin and a vintage car restoration and repair service, as well as a classic car trading programme, called “Reloaded by Creators”.
