= Fiat Downtown =

1993 concept car

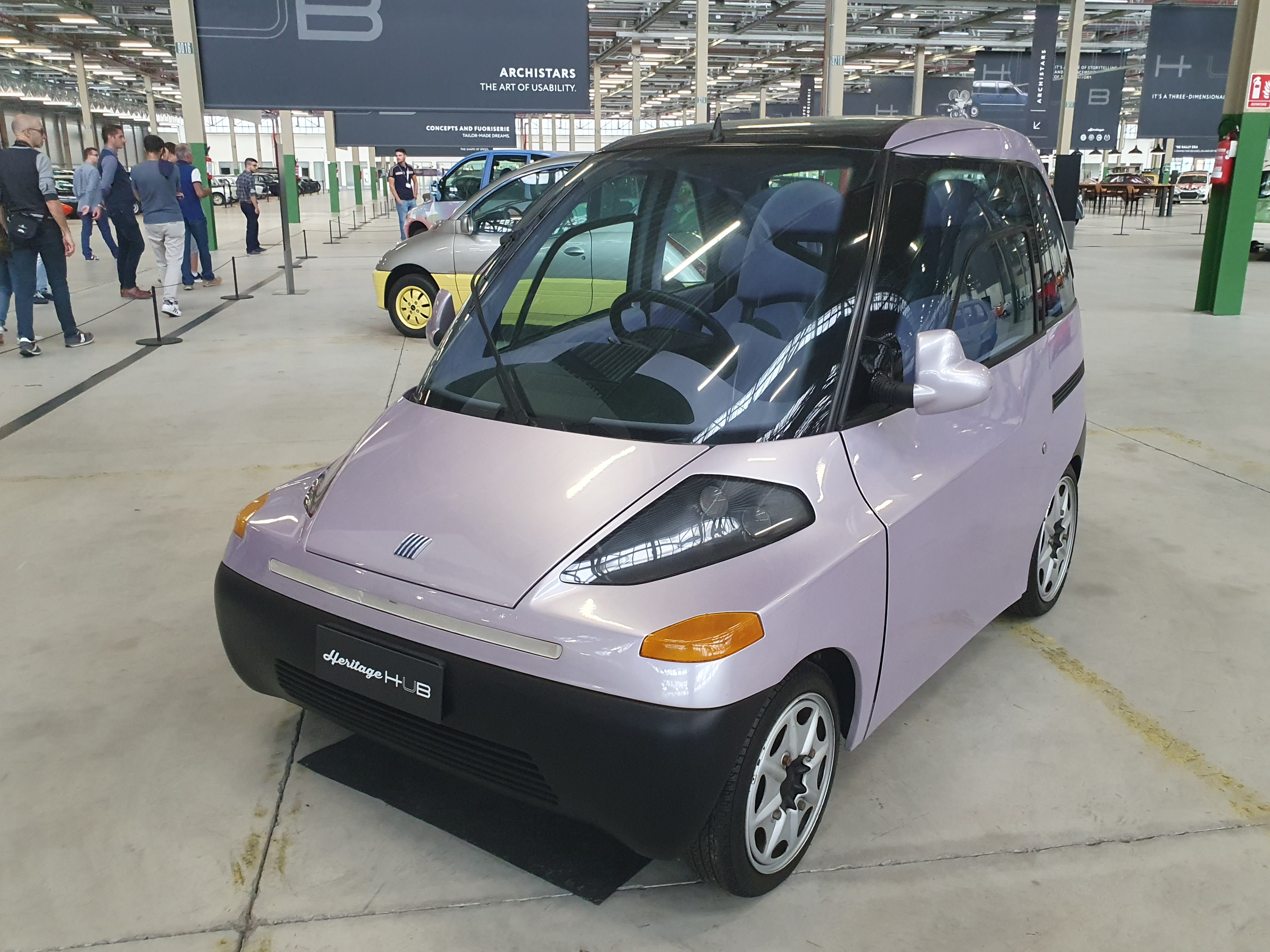
1993 Fiat Downtown on display at the FCA Heritage HUB in Turin

The Fiat Downtown is a concept car originally shown in 1993 at the Turin Motor Show by the Italian car company Fiat. It was designed by Roberto Giolito. From 1991 to 1993, 2 examples were made in total, first by Stola and second by Fiat from ready molds.

The Downtown is a plastic bodied car on an aluminium chassis, resulting in a low kerb weight of 700 kg (1,500 lb). It is powered by a 9.5 hp (7.1 kW) motor integrated in each rear wheel, with rear-mounted sodium-sulphur batteries that can achieve a claimed top speed of 100 km/h (62 mph), or a range of 300 km (190 mi) at 50 km/h (31 mph).
