= Fiat Trepiùno =

Concept city car

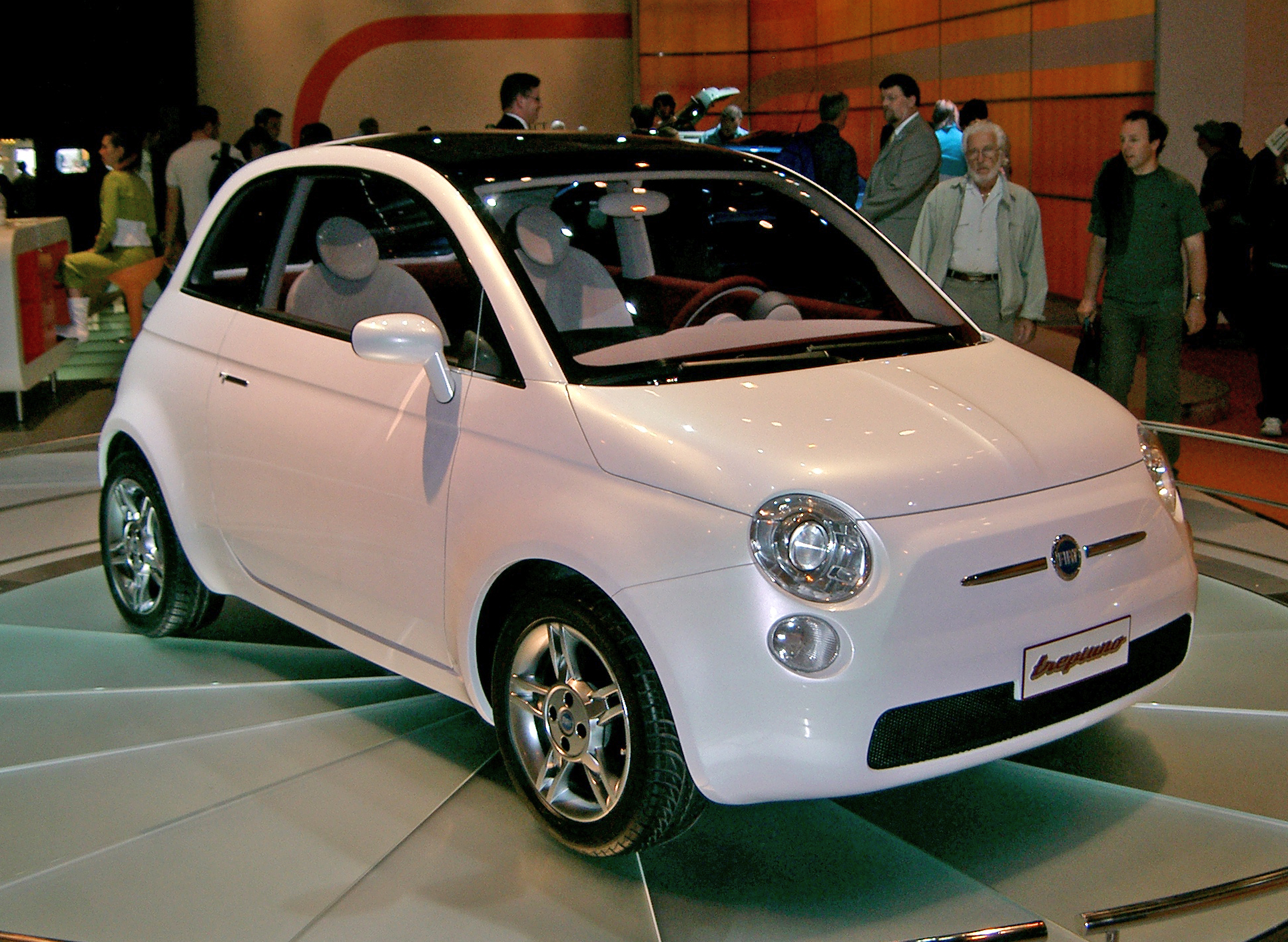

Overview
- Manufacturer: Fiat
- Designer: Roberto Giolito at Centro Stile Fiat

Body and chassis
- Class: Subcompact
- Body style: 3-door hatchback concept car
- Layout: Front engine, front-wheel drive / four-wheel drive

Dimensions
- Length: 129.6 in (3,292 mm)

The Fiat Trepiùno is a transverse front-engine, front-wheel drive, four-passenger concept city car introduced by Fiat at the 2004 Geneva Salon international de l'auto; styled at the Centro Stile Fiat; powered by a 54 hp 1100cc engine and built by the Turin-based company, I.DE.A.

Designed by Roberto Giolito, the Trepiùno is noted for its reconfigurable interior, which can accommodate four passengers in a 3+1 configuration, i.e., three adults and one occasional passenger. The name Trepiùno translates from Italian as "three plus one".

Presented at the Geneva Motor Show under the theme "Return to the Future," the Trepiùno's styling recalled Fiat's original Fiat 500, introduced for model year 1957 and widely called the Bambino — a model that was designed by noted Fiat engineer Dante Giacosa and went on to sell more than four million examples over a production run of 18 years. The Trepiùno also uses Giacosa's breakthrough transverse front-wheel drive layout — which ultimately became an industry standard, the front-wheel drive layout "adopted by virtually every other manufacturer in the world."

The 2004 concept Trepiùno inspired a subsequent production four-seater hatchback and cabriolet, the 6th-generation 500 & 500C (2007), designed under the direction of Frank Stephenson at Centro Stile Fiat. The 500 would go on to be marketed in more than 100 countries worldwide and win more than 40 awards, including the CAR Magazine Car of the Year (2007) and the 2008 European Car of the Year. It is still in production more than a decade after its launch.

== Origins ==
Stung by the tremendous success of the Smart Fortwo, especially in Italy, Fiat began examining a variety of small car concepts "to regain its small-car crown," — developing an "intense interest in producing a Smart (Fortwo) competitor" — and concluding that "most customers want more than just the Smart’s two seats."

Roberto Giolito said "many owners of vehicles such as the two-seater Smart would prefer added seating flexibility and that desire has prompted the option of a third seat in the Fiat Trepiuno concept," adding: "three seats is a good number for the city car", where the Smart (Fortwo) could be restrictive. The Fiat philosophy there is the trend to create something more useful for daily problems."

== Design ==
External images
- Fiat Trepiùno; extendable trunk
- Fiat Trepiùno; extendable trunk
- Fiat Trepiùno; 3+1 Seating Concept
- Fiat Trepiùno; dash control panel
- Fiat Trepiùno; dash controls

Seating concept

Consistent with its 3+1 name, the Trepiùno's packaging concept combines an overall short length with high h-point seating — and a seating configuration where the front passenger can slide forward toward a reconfigurable dashboard with an inward-folding collapsable glovebox — thus enabling sufficient room for one full-size rear passenger along with a fourth, strictly occasional, "emergency" child seat behind the driver — or enabling a pure 3-seat or 2-seat vehicle by folding one or both rear seats.

The 3+1 capability allowed the Trepiùno to "transcend the classic 2+2 arrangements of certain coupés or open-topped sports cars and also the configurations of many city cars that limit passenger room to just two seats in the front." Fiat would later adopt a production version of the Trepiùno, but not as a 3+1 — a seating arrangement that did appear in the Opel Trixx (2004) concept car and in the production 2008 Toyota iQ city car, four years after the Trepiùno's debut.

Fiat worked with engineers at Johnson Controls to develop the Trepiùno seating package, minimizing seat thickness and using a sandwich of soft polyurethane over a thin and rigid polyurethane frame. Rear seat backrests could fold inward and upward, extending the concealed load compartment.

Design details

The Trepiùno's dashboard features two storage drawers; interior lighting using light-emitting diodes to illuminate the cabin at night; and tail-lights that communicate with the dashboard TFT/LCD screen. Foreshadowing the 500C (Cabriolet) model of the subsequent production model and recalling the 1957 500's folding canvas sunroof the Trepiùno features a fixed polycarbonate roof, marketed as a Skydome. Head restraints featured a distinctive circular shape and were carried forward to the production Fiat 500. A two-part tailgate (a la Smart Fortwo) featured lower half-gate designed to support loading, along with an upper half-gate including the rear window and an upper spoiler.

In updating the styling of the 1957 500, Roberto Giolito said “the important thing is what you leave out. We left out the double bubble” — the two curved forms of original. These shapes served a structural purpose on the original, strengthening the bodywork. Given that the Trepiùno had a different layout (front vs. rear engine) and bodywork, the structural shapes were unnecessary. According to Giolito, "the reason the original 500 worked, he said, was that its designer, Dante Giacosa, was an engineer who understood structure."

In addition to I.D.E.A. Institute and Johnson Controls, Fiat engineers worked with Bosch, Ficosa, Hitachi, IXFIN SpA, Magneti Marelli, Pirelli, Rieter and Toora to develop the Trepiùno concept.

Infotainment control system

The Trepiùno's instrument panel features an innovative integral control and infotainment system, developed by Johnson Controls over a period of two years — presaging such systems as Ford's Sync, Kia Uvo and Fiat's own Blue&Me. The Trepiùno system, marketed as MultiController, features a flush-mounted function control system with an instrument panel mounted display as well as a deployable/retractable TFT/LCD panel. Commands for climate control, fog lights or entertainment are accessed by the deployed TFT/LCD or by tapping the dashboard's pressure-sensitive translucent silicone membrane, marketed as ElekTex. The concept eliminated buttons and switches; could luminously "trace" user inputs; and was augmented by a touch-sensitive multi-function controller located between the front seats.

== See also ==
- Blue&Me
- Ford Sync
- Fiat New 500 3+1
- Smart Fortwo
- Toyota iQ
