= Downton =

Downton could be

== Places ==
- Downton, Hampshire, England
- Downton, Herefordshire, England
- Downton, Wiltshire, England
- Downton (UK Parliament constituency), a former parliament constituency in Wiltshire
- Mount Downton, a volcanic peak in British Columbia, Canada
- Downton Lake, a reservoir in British Columbia, Canada

== Other uses ==
- Downton (surname)
- Downton F.C., a football club based in Wiltshire, England

== See also ==
- Downton Abbey, a British television period drama
- Downton Castle, an 18th-century country house at Downton on the Rock, Herefordshire
- Downton pump
- Downtown (disambiguation)
- Down (disambiguation)
