= Roberto Giolito =

Italian automobile designer (born 1962)

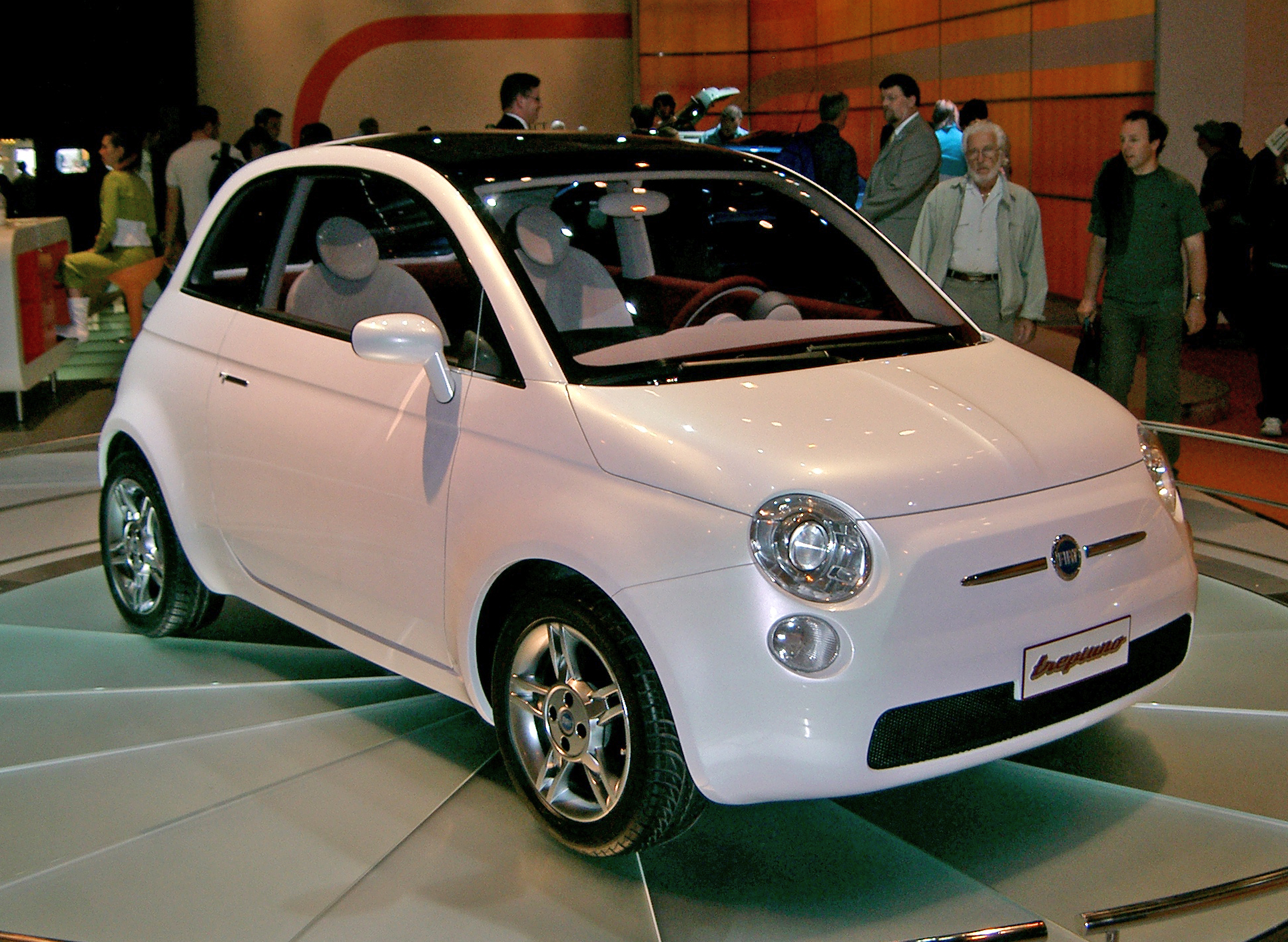
- 2004 Fiat Trepiùno Concept
- Born: 10 November 1962 (age 63); Ancona, Italy
- Education: Istituto Superiore per le Industrie Artistiche
- Occupation: Automobile designer
- Known for: Fiat Multipla, Fiat Trepiùno, Fiat 500 (2007)

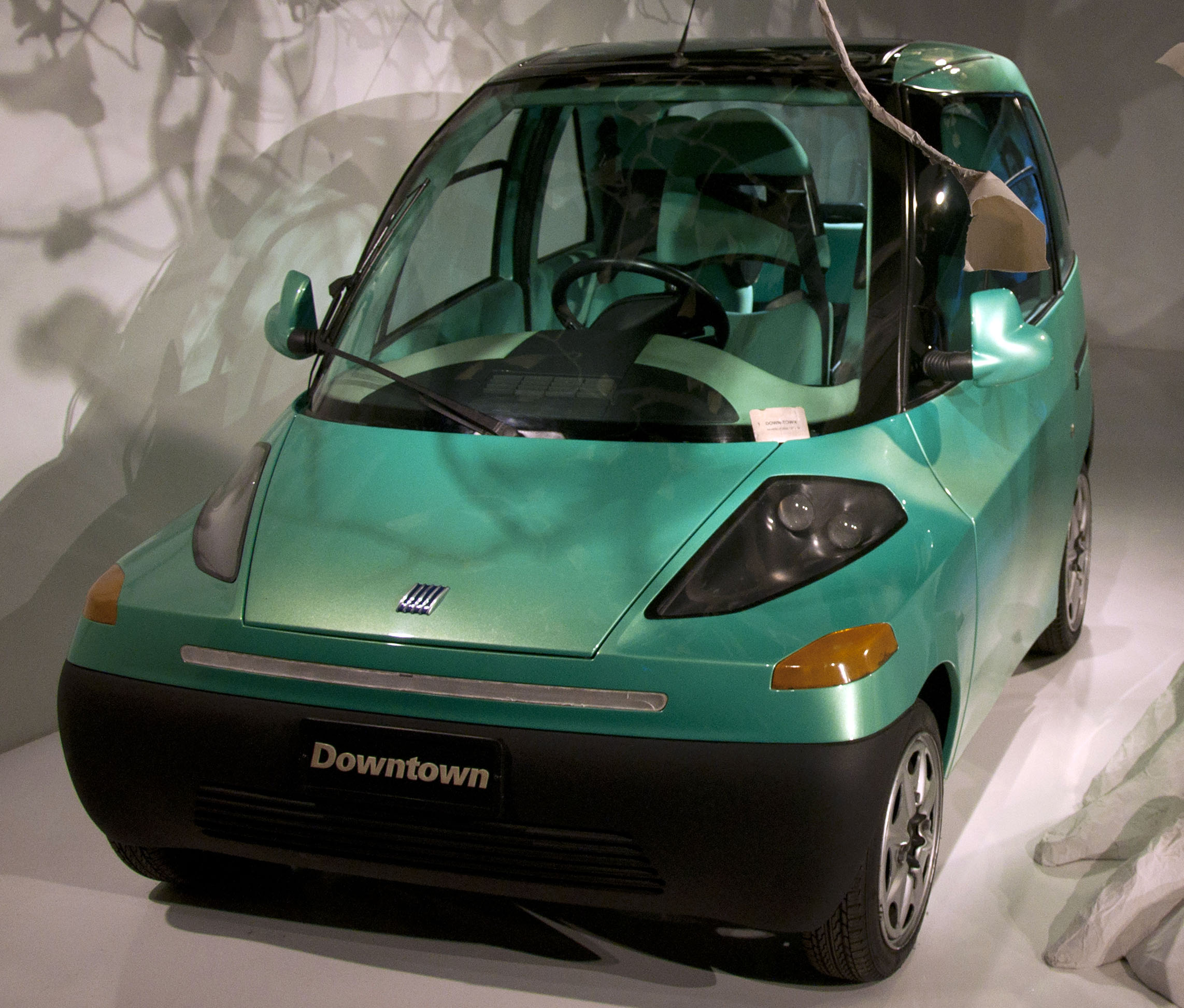
Fiat Downtown on display at the Museo Nazionale dell'Automobile in Turin

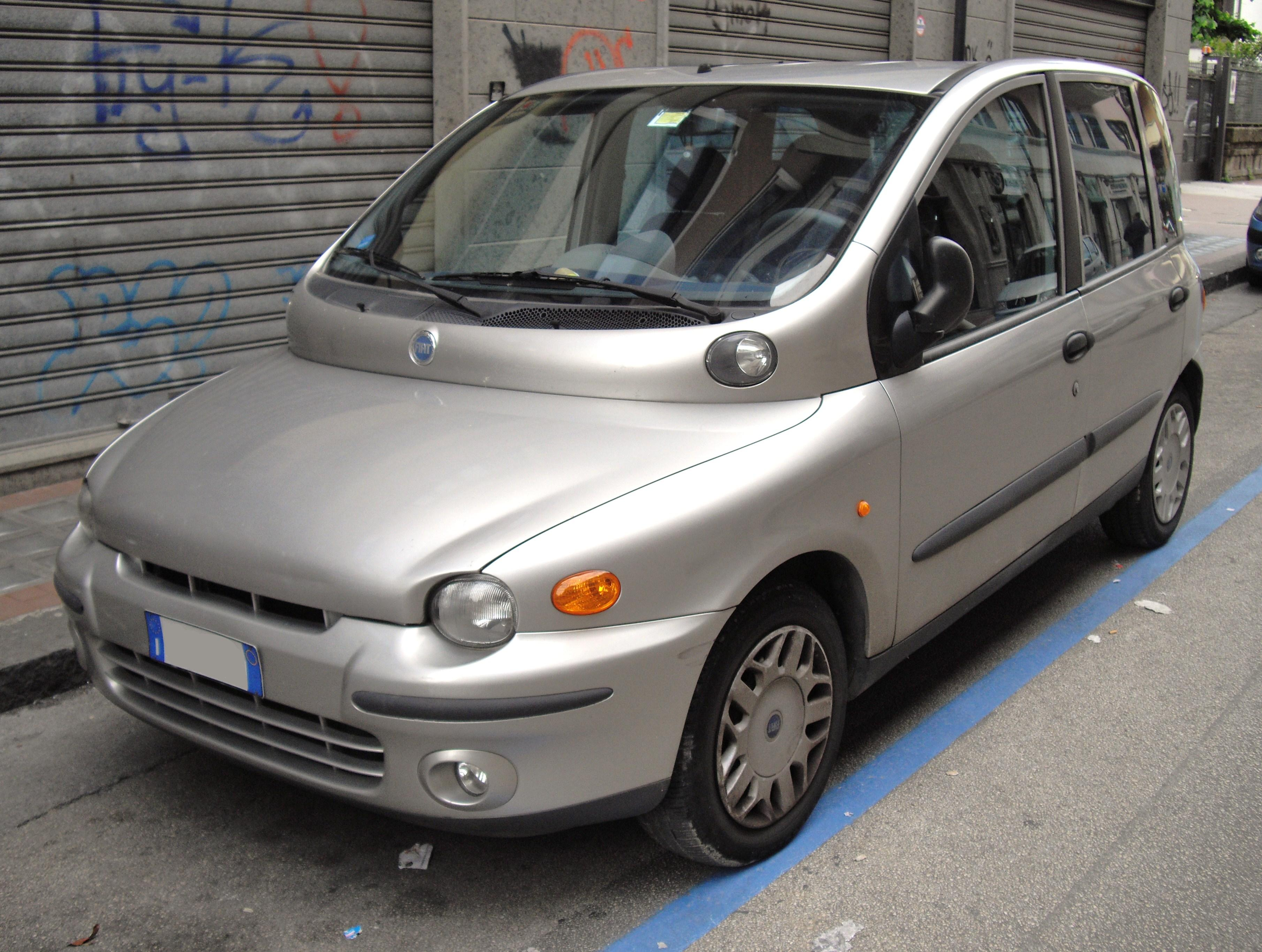
Fiat Multipla

Roberto Giolito (born 10 November 1962) is an Italian automobile designer. Acting as Chief Designer at Fiat, Giolito is widely known for the Fiat Multipla (1998, exhibited at MoMA, New York), and the 2004 Fiat Trepiùno concept — precursor to the Fiat 500 of 2007, voted Car of the Year in 2008 and World Car Design of the Year 2009.

== Background ==
Born in 1962 in Ancona, Italy, Giolito graduated in industrial design from Istituto Superiore per le Industrie Artistiche (Higher Institute for Artistic Industries, ISIA) in Rome in 1985. For four years he worked in graphic, communications and furniture design before joining Fiat in 1989.

In high school Giolito played jazz bass, playing in a high school program with American masters including saxophonist Lee Konitz and playing through design school, earning money on the side by teaching music. Giolito continues to play jazz music, and collects vintage vacuum-tube-powered audio equipment.

Giolito has received design influence from a range of sources, including Ettore Sottsass’s Olivetti portable electric typewriter; an early Apple II computer with which he designed his home as well as a battery-powered car with Chris Bangle — and architects including le Corbusier and Jean Nouvel.

== Career ==
In July 1989 Giolito won a position at Fiat, after responding to an advertisement looking for computer-savvy young designers. At the advanced design studio, Giolito penned several concept cars, including the Fiat Downtown (1993), Zic (1994), and Ecobasic (2000). At Fiat, he has designed experimental electric vehicles, sedans, sports cars (e.g., Maserati) as well as a farm tractor for New Holland.

In 2001, he was nominated to chief director at Fiat S.p.A. and is currently the head of Fiat & Abarth Design. He continues to work on new small models for the company.

In 1998 he designed the much discussed and highly controversial Fiat Multipla, both criticized and praised, achieving only meager commercial success, and was exhibited in the 1999 MoMA exhibition "Different Roads: Automobiles for the Next Century". Proclaimed "Car of the Year" by the magazine Top Gear and for several consecutive years was awarded the "Family car of the year".

In 2007 Giolito designed the Fiat 500: car of the year in 2008, World car design of the year in 2009 and Compasso d'Oro for industrial design in 2011.

From 2011 to 2015, at FCA Giolito was head designer of the Centro Stile for the Fiat and Abarth brands and also Vice President of the design center for the EMEA market.

Since 2016 he has been Head of FCA Heritage, the department tasked with safeguarding, publicising and promoting the historic legacy of FCA's Italian brands.

== Giolito designs ==
- Fiat Downtown concept
- Fiat Zic concept
- Fiat Multipla
- Fiat Ecobasic concept (as project manager)
- Fiat Trepiùno concept
- Fiat 500 (2007)
- Fiat 500L
- Fiat Panda (2011 - present)
- Fiat Palio (2011)
- Fiat Ottimo
- Abarth Classiche 1000 SP

== Honors ==
- Designer of the year 2009
