= Cityscape of Cincinnati =

Cincinnati, Ohio is home to numerous structures that are noteworthy due to their architectural characteristics or historic associations. The city also boasts Fountain Square and a riverfront that is being revitalized under The Banks project.

== Famous buildings ==
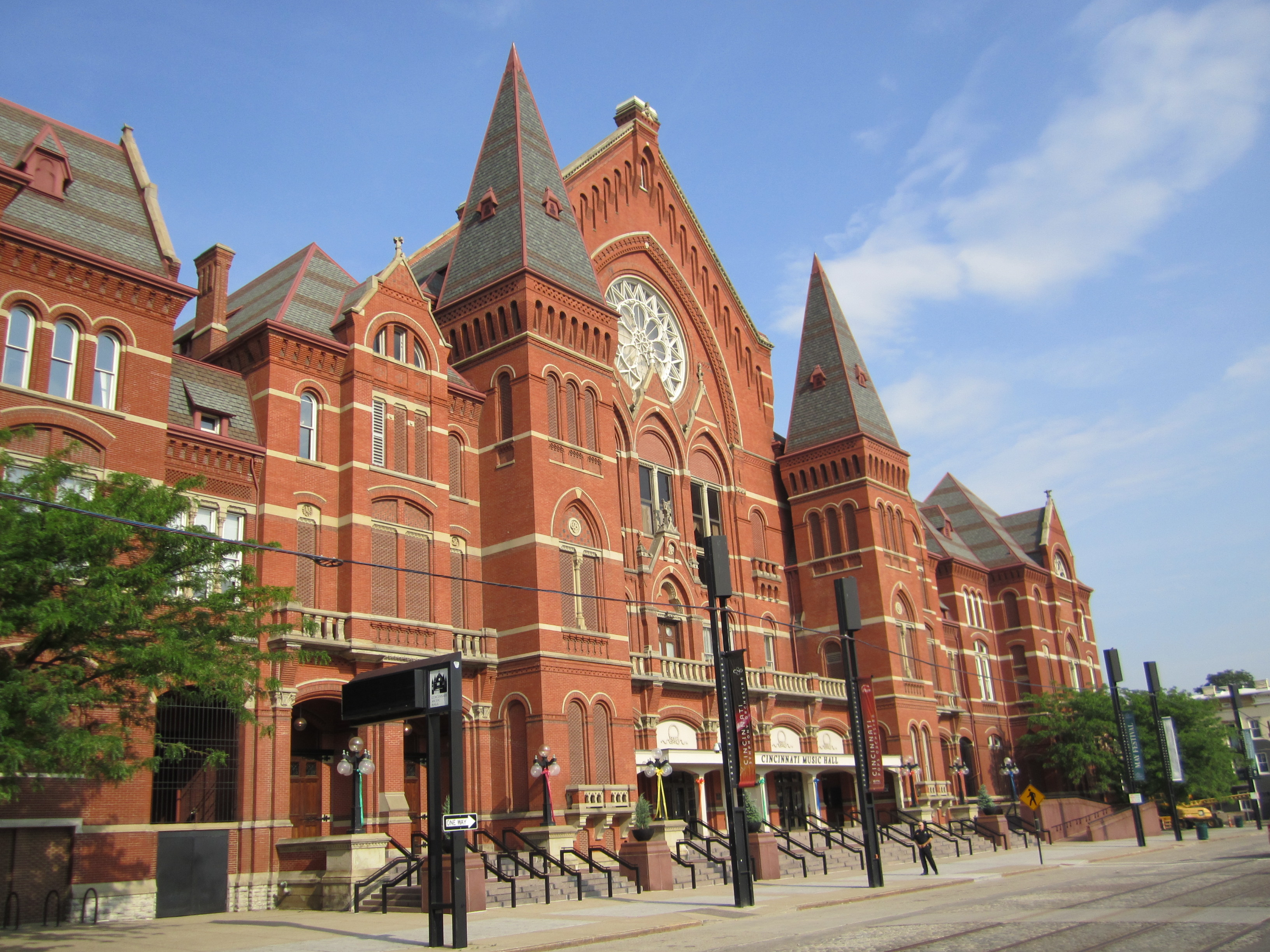
Cincinnati Music Hall

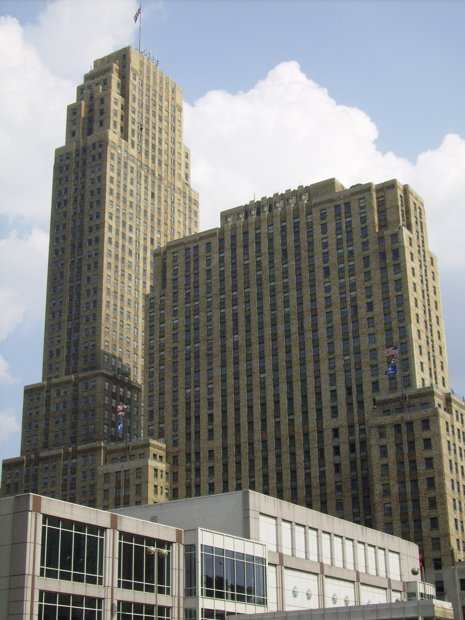
The Carew Tower is the 2nd tallest building and a great example of Art Deco.

Carew Tower: The second tallest building in Cincinnati and a National Historic Landmark with an open-air observation deck on 49th story. It was the basis for the Empire State Building and contains some of the finest examples of French Art Deco architecture.

Great American Tower at Queen City Square: The tower replaced the Carew Tower as Cincinnati's tallest.

Ingalls Building: The world's first reinforced concrete skyscraper.

Fourth and Vine Tower: The 5th tallest in the world and tallest in the U.S., outside of New York City when it was built in 1914.

Scripps Center: Home of the world headquarters for the E. W. Scripps Company.

Star Tower: A free-standing TV/Radio transmission tower.

Aronoff Center: Performing arts center, by world-renowned architect César Pelli.

Cincinnati Union Terminal: A train station (still housing an Amtrak station) that is now primarily a museum and widely considered one of the finest examples of the Art Deco style.

Cincinnati Music Hall: One of the oldest and largest performance halls in the U.S. particularly noted for its Gothic German architecture.

National Underground Railroad Freedom Center was recently built along the bank of the Ohio River as part of The Banks Project.

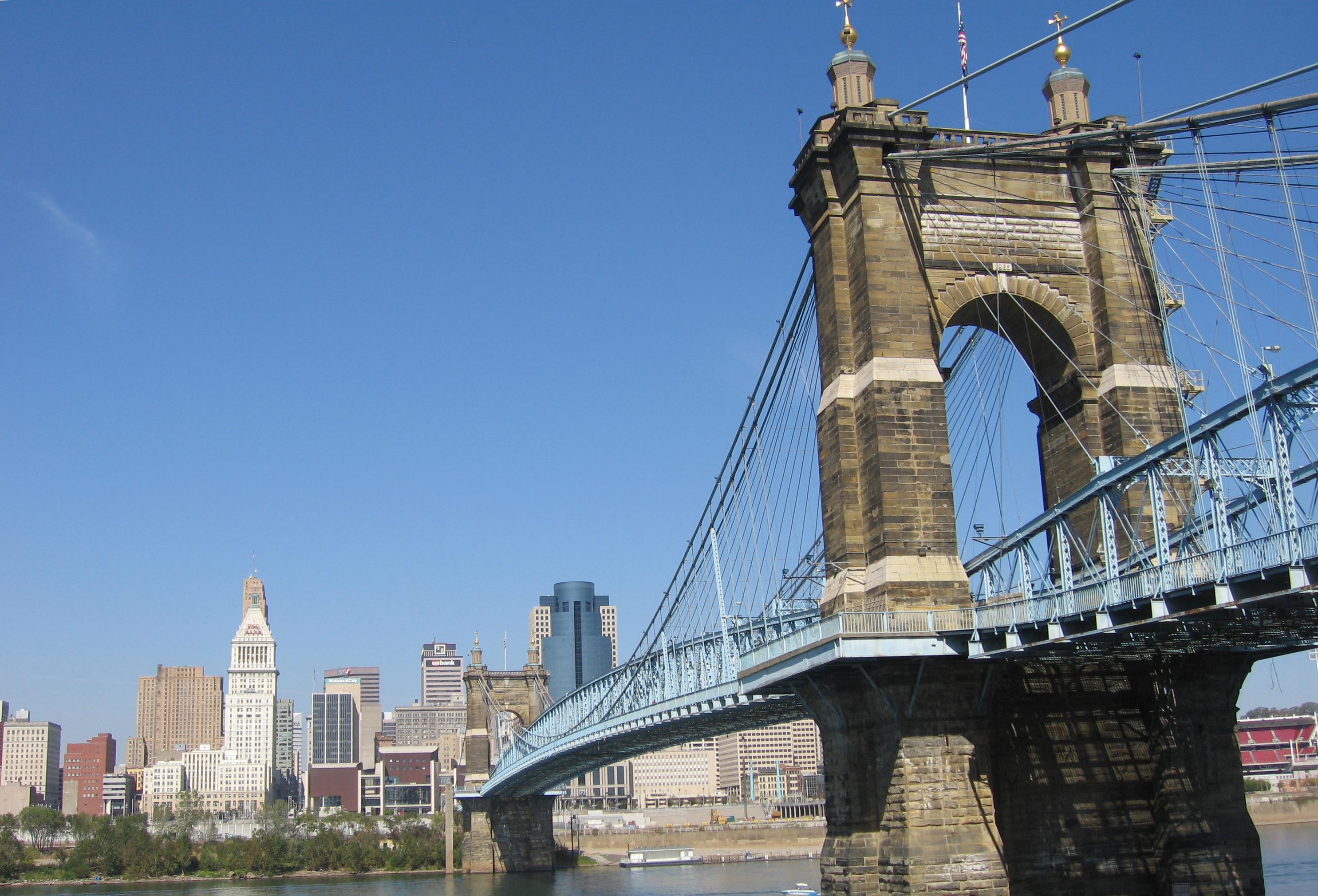
The John A. Roebling Suspension Bridge with Cincinnati in the background

Riverbend Music Center is a 20,000-seat outdoor amphitheater complex located on the banks of the Ohio River at the eastern edge of the city limits. It features two covered pavilions each seating approximately 4,500 people and was designed by renowned architect Michael Graves, an alumnus of the University of Cincinnati.

Rosenthal Center for Contemporary Art by Iraqi architect Zaha Hadid, 2004 winner of the Pritzker Architecture Prize. Called by the New York Times the "most important American building to be completed since the end of the Cold War."

Saint Peter in Chains Basilica is the main Roman Catholic Basilica for the Greater Cincinnati region. Its cornerstone was set on May 20, 1841—and upon completion, it became the tallest structure in Cincinnati for its time.

Isaac M. Wise Temple is the historic temple erected for Rabbi Isaac Mayer Wise who was the founder of American Reform Judaism.

The Union Central Insurance Company building in Forest Park, a suburb of Cincinnati OH. Built 1964.

== Fountain Square ==
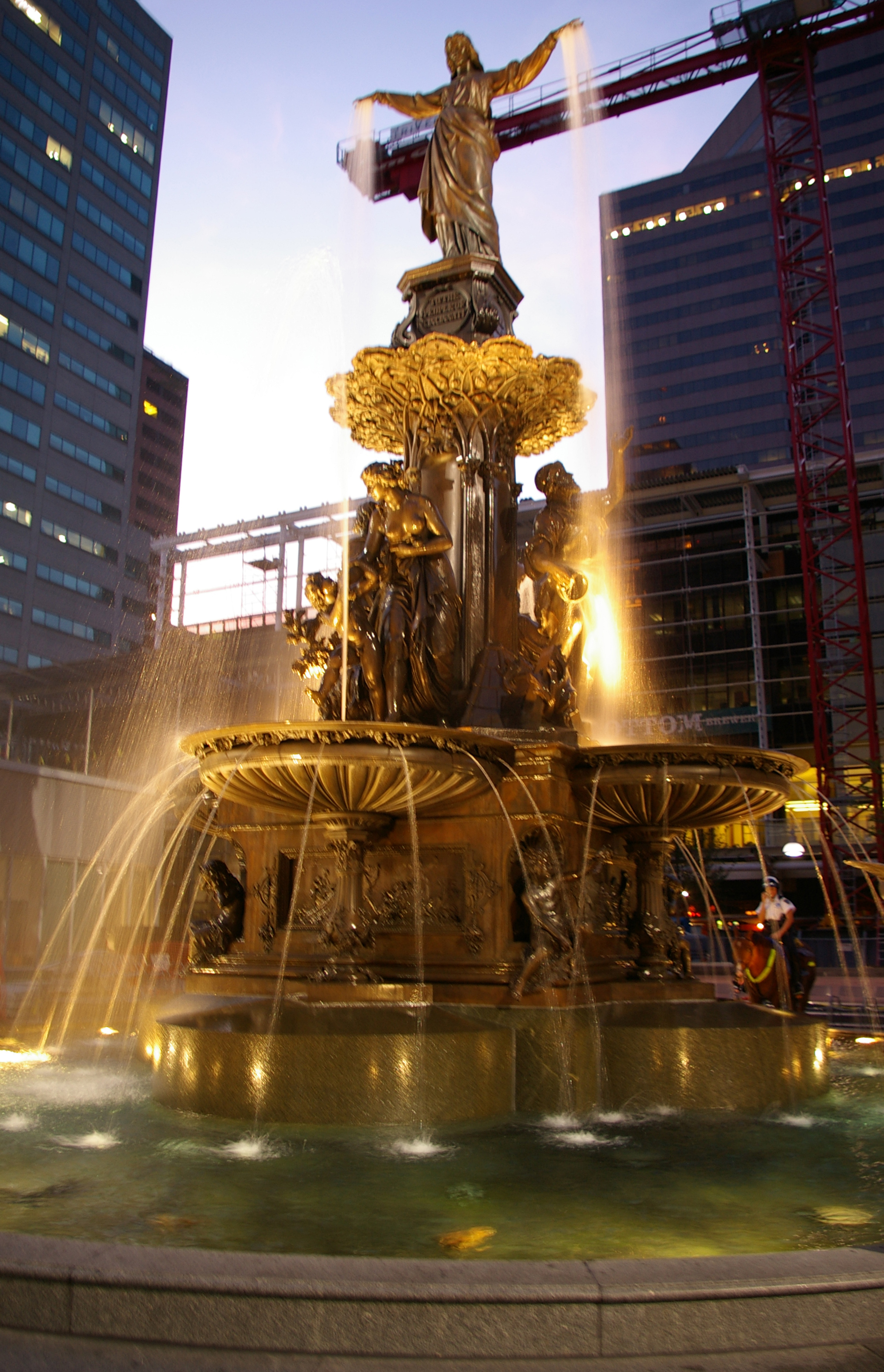
Tyler Davidson Fountain, centerpiece of Fountain Square

Fountain Square is a public square in Downtown Cincinnati, located at Fifth Street and Vine. Its centerpiece is the landmark bronze Tyler Davidson Fountain. The square is a popular hardscape, surrounded by hotels, banks, department stores, and restaurants. The space was donated to the city of Cincinnati by prominent citizen Henry Probasco and dedicated on its completion in 1871 to his brother-in-law, Tyler Davidson.

In 1998, the fountain underwent extensive restoration. In September 2005, the fountain was temporarily moved to the Cincinnati Art Museum while Square was extensively renovated. The fountain was returned to a different location on the Square on August 19, 2006, in preparation for its re-opening in early October 2006.

Fountain Square was featured in the credits of the television series WKRP in Cincinnati.

== Riverfront ==
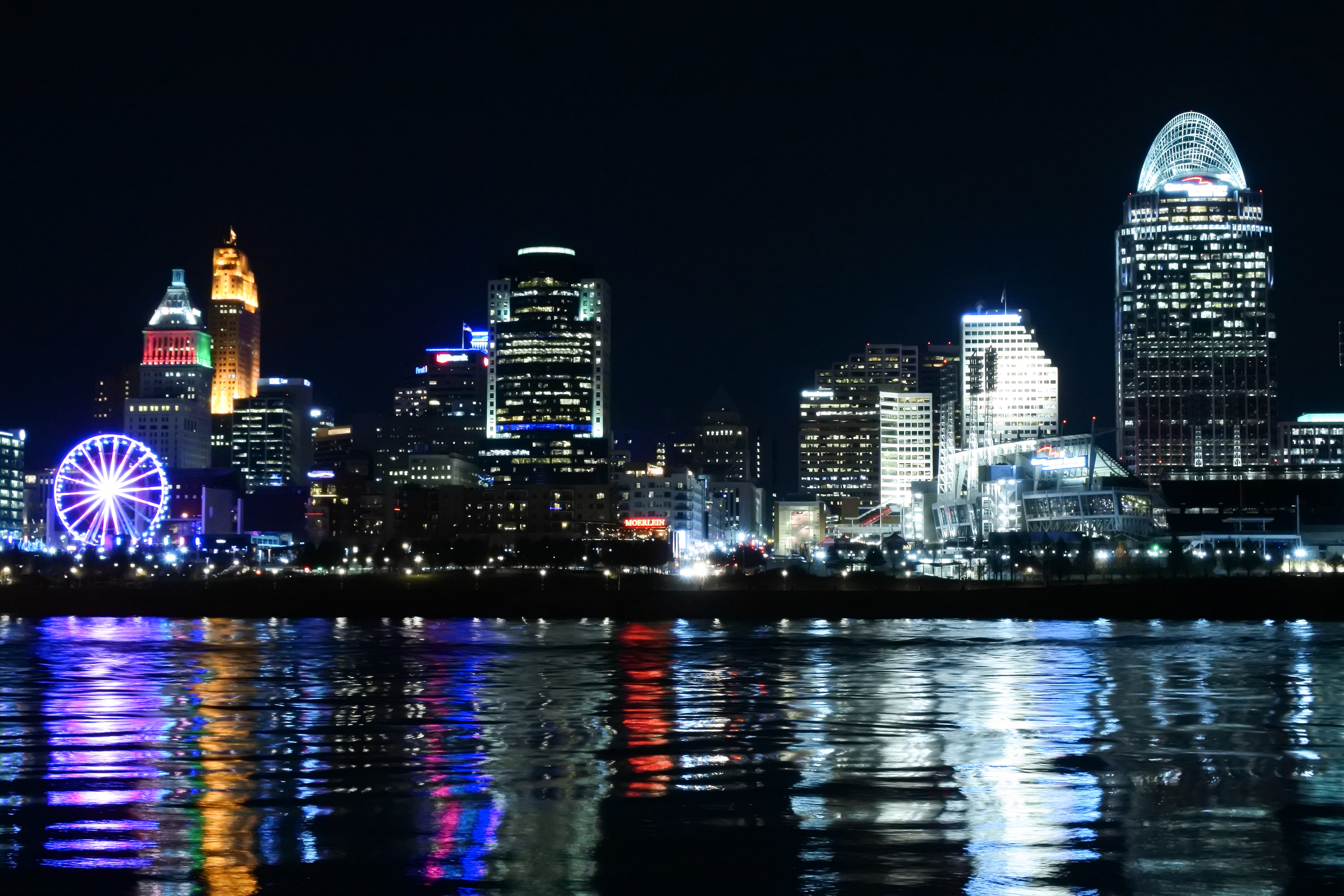
Downtown Cincinnati viewed from across the Ohio River, seen from the Kentucky side

Being situated on the Ohio River, Cincinnati is home to several prominent bridges that connect the downtown to Covington, Kentucky and Newport, Kentucky. In fact, there are more bridges that cross the Ohio River in Cincinnati than at any other place on the River. These bridges include the historic and picturesque John A. Roebling Suspension Bridge, which served as a prototype for the Brooklyn Bridge; the Daniel Carter Beard Bridge (a.k.a. The Big Mac Bridge); and the Newport Southbank Bridge (sometimes referred to as the Purple People Bridge), which is the longest pedestrian-only bridge in the United States connecting two states.

Cincinnatians place great value on the riverfront for its entertainment and economic benefits. The riverfront is home to both Paycor Stadium home of the Cincinnati Bengals, and to Great American Ball Park home of the Cincinnati Reds, as well as to the National Underground Railroad Freedom Center. "The Banks", a 40-acre (160,000 m^{2}) site planned for future mixed commercial, residential, and public recreational use is also on the riverfront. The annual WEBN Fireworks on Labor Day are celebrated at the river, as is Tall Stacks, the largest gathering of steam riverboats in the nation. Many cultural festivals are held at Sawyer Point, including the Cincy Blues Fest and the Cincinnati Celtic Festival, formerly held at Ault Park. Coney Island is on the river several miles east (upriver) from the Downtown area.

== Neighborhoods ==
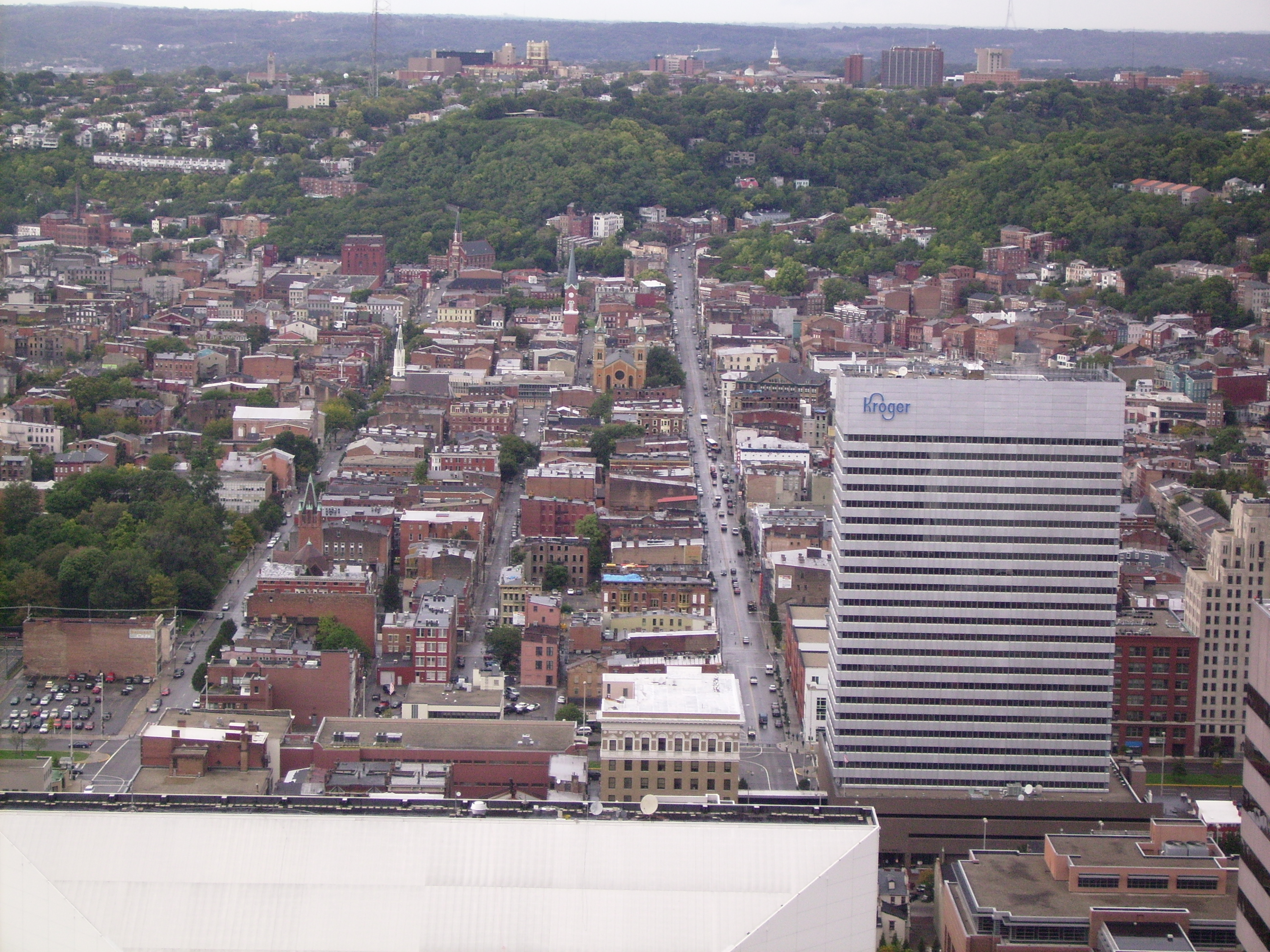
Over-the-Rhine

Cincinnati's unique geography nestles its neighborhoods in small basins and the hillsides that overlook them. Because of this, many of the city's neighborhoods developed very strong identities. Today's city neighborhoods such as Clifton, Hyde Park, Mount Washington, Westwood, College Hill, and Carthage were originally settled as separate villages, with business sections of their own. Over-the-Rhine was an important neighborhood in German American history. Northside also has its own identity.

Also highly important to the city's landscape is the division into "East Side and West Side." The division came about after the construction of Interstate Route 71, which runs north from Kentucky towards Columbus, Ohio. The rivalry has been intense at times (limited violence or reported discrimination), but is considered mostly light-hearted, although a good number of city residents take the division more seriously. Accents, fashion, attitudes, city planning (i.e., the way the houses are laid out), financial demographics, and other items are some of the stereotypes and behaviors that separate the two distinctions. Though this division is often considered a point of contention in the city, it has only led to limited incidents of violence or litigious discrimination and is considered more of a "charming quirk" than a divisive hindrance to society.

== Larger divisions ==
Interstates 71 and 75 define the four major areas of the city.

- The area in between I-75 and I-71 tends to be denser and more urban and can be further divided into four smaller areas that decrease in density as one moves further away from the river.
  - The central business district is the area south of Central Parkway and is surrounded on three sides by Interstate Highways 75 and 71.
  - A densely populated urban area surrounds the central business district to the west and north, filling up the rest of the low, flat basin between the two highways and extending all the way to the foothills. Its major components are the West End and Over-the-Rhine.
  - To the north where the hills begin is the Uptown area, the area surrounding the University of Cincinnati. This area is the second major business district featuring the other sizable collection of high-rise buildings and public institutions in the city, such as the aforementioned university and the Cincinnati Zoo. A large number of hospitals are located here as well. Many people, including a large number of students, call this diverse and densely populated area home.
- North of Uptown is a largely residential area, home to many well-established neighborhoods such as Avondale, Clifton, Bond Hill, and Evanston. Again, major city institutions are common here, such as Xavier University in Evanston and Cincinnati Gardens, the city’s former NBA venue in Bond Hill.
- Just west of Downtown, I-75 follows the Mill Creek Valley as it winds its way north from the river. The Mill Creek Valley is the industrial heart of the city and the center of production, storage, and freight transportation. Interstate 75 is a major transnational trucking route and the valley contains the city's main rail complex and a water port where Mill Creek meets the Ohio River. The size and complexity of this area physically separate the West Side from the rest of the city. Accessing the West Side from the east usually requires crossing any one of several large viaducts, which accentuates the East/West division.
- The area west of I-75, the West Side, is a residential area. It is popularly known for its working class character.
- The East Side, east of I-71, is also largely residential. It is popularly known as an upper-middle class area.

The suburbs of the city also tend to follow this pattern, with higher density found between the two highways (the business centers of Blue Ash, Evendale, and Sharonville, for instance), heavy industry and freight located along Mill Creek and I-75 (The sprawling GE Aviation plant, for instance), and residential suburbs to the east and west. In Kentucky the pattern continues, with densely populated Covington and Newport located between the 71/75 and 471 interstates, and lower density residential cities such as Villa Hills and Fort Thomas to either side.

== New development projects ==
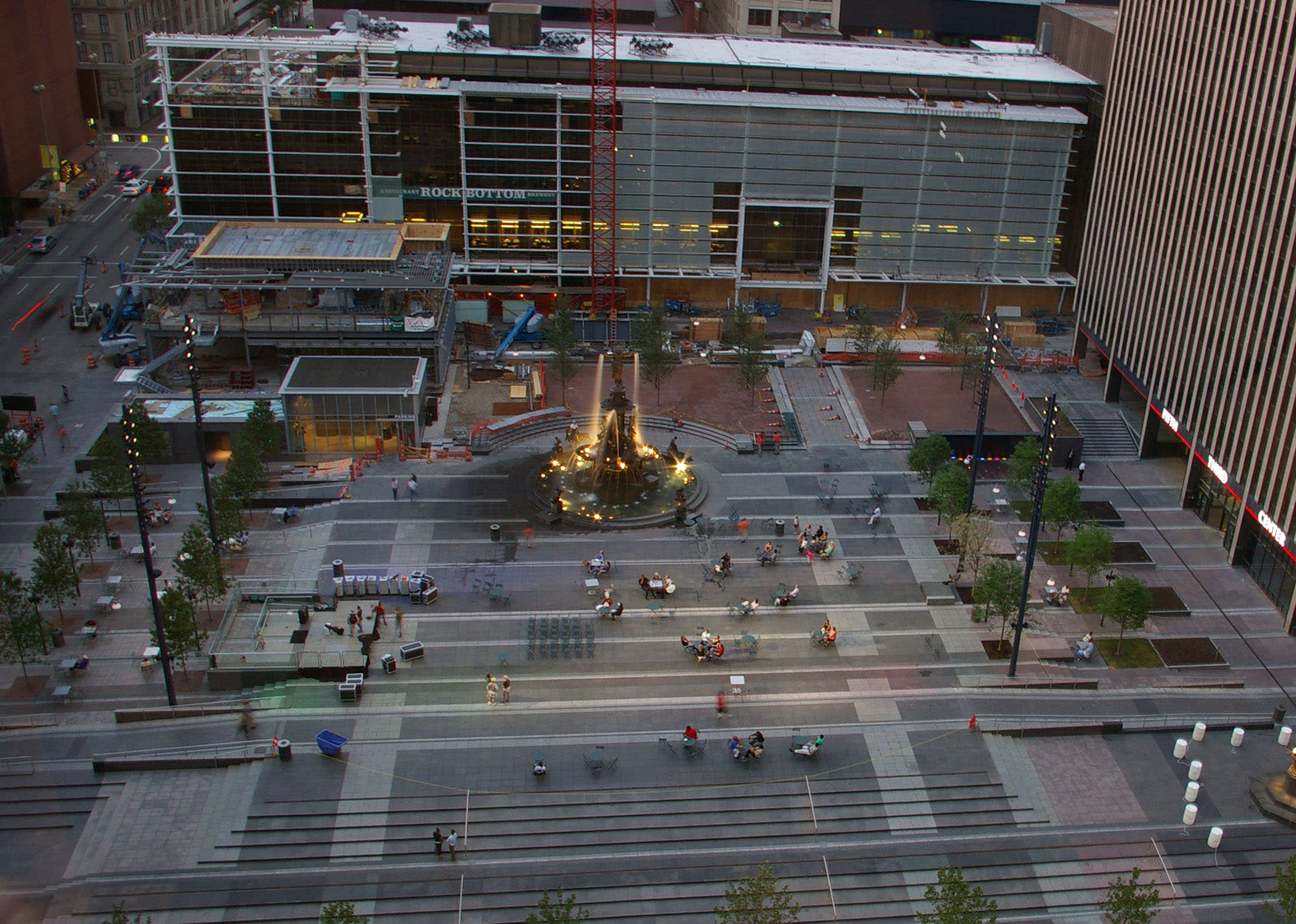
Fountain Square was renovated by 3CDC in 2005

Much of the new development plans are run through the Cincinnati Center City Development Corporation (3CDC) which was formed in July 2003 as part of the overall system to increase the effectiveness and efficiency of development activities in the City, as recommended by The Cincinnati Economic Development Task Force. 3CDC works collaboratively with the City and the Port of Greater Cincinnati Development Authority to take full advantage of each organization's resources and abilities. They plan to develop in three specific areas: The Banks, Fountain Square, Over-The-Rhine.

Cincinnati's City Manager Office also organizes and promotes development within the city, through the Economic Development Division. EDD serves as a liaison between the City and developers, development authorities, and development corporations that are seeking to promote development within the City. These are broken down into Commercial, Mixed-Use, and Residential.

== See also ==
- List of companies in Greater Cincinnati
