= Fiat Multipla =

Six-seater car produced from 1998 to 2010

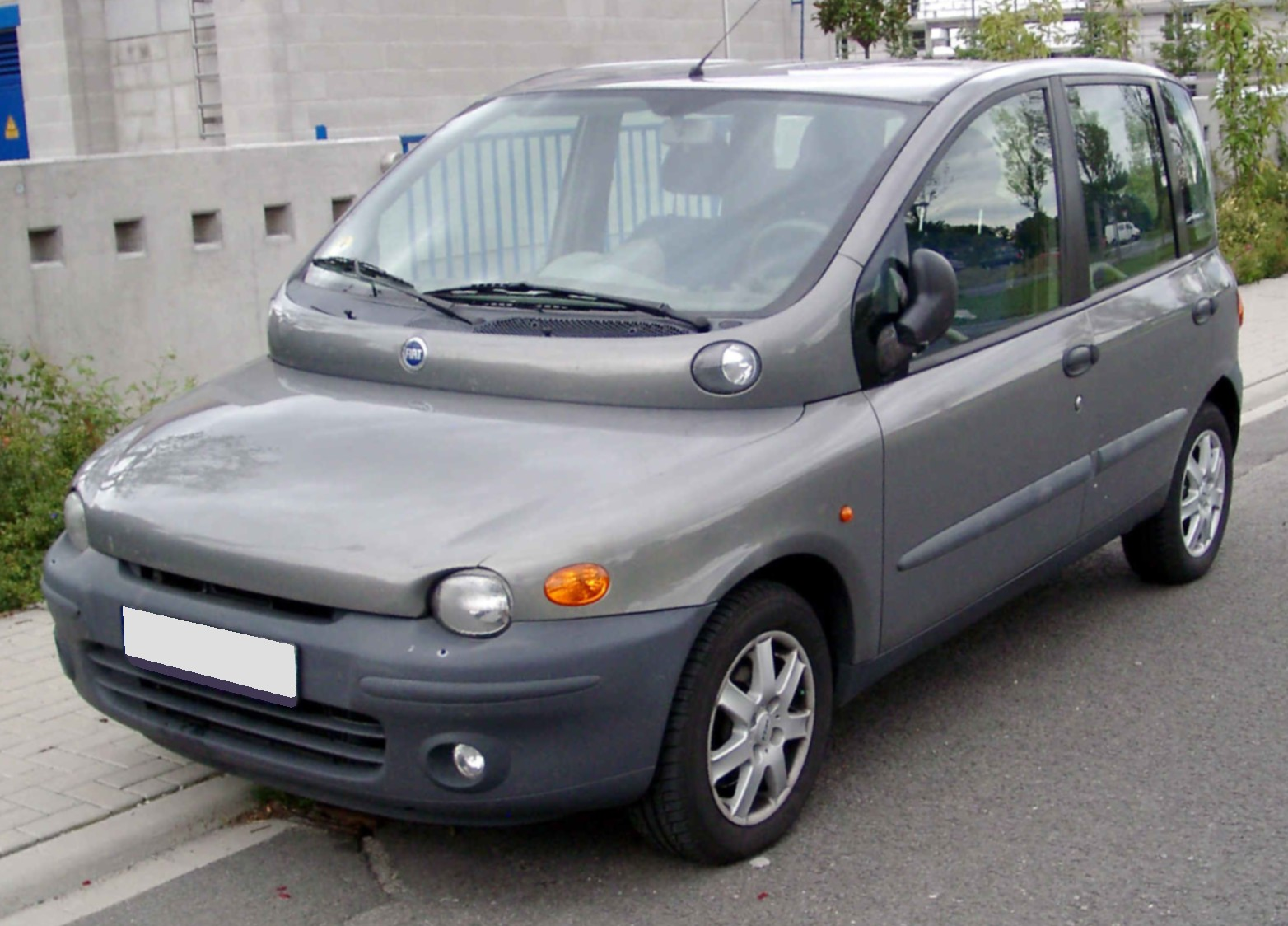

Overview
- Manufacturer: Fiat
- Also called: Zotye Multiplan/M300 Langyue/M300EV/E300 (China)
- Production: 1998–2010; 2008–2013 (China)
- Assembly: Italy: Turin (Mirafiori plant); Milan (Arese plant, CNG version); China: Changshan County, Quzhou (Zotye Auto)
- Designer: Roberto Giolito at Centro Stile Fiat

Body and chassis
- Class: Compact MPV
- Body style: 5-door wagon
- Platform: Fiat C1
- Related: Alfa Romeo 147; Alfa Romeo 156; Alfa Romeo GT; Fiat Bravo/Brava; Fiat Marea; Lancia Lybra; Zotye Multipla (second generation)

Powertrain
- Engine: 1.6 L 16V petrol I4; 1.6 L 16V LPG/petrol I4; 1.6 L 16V CNG I4; 1.6 L 16V CNG/petrol I4; 1.9 L JTD diesel I4; 1.9 L Multijet diesel I4
- Transmission: 5-speed manual; 1-speed Fixed-ratio (EV)
- Battery: 35.2 kWh lithium ion
- Electric range: 125 mi (201 km)

Dimensions
- Wheelbase: 2,666 mm (105.0 in)
- Length: 3,994 mm (157.2 in); 4,080 mm (160.6 in) (facelift)
- Width: 1,871 mm (73.7 in)
- Height: 1,670 mm (65.7 in)
- Kerb weight: 1,300–1,490 kg (2,866–3,285 lb)

Chronology
- Predecessor: Fiat 600 Multipla
- Successor: Fiat 500L

The Fiat Multipla (Type 186) is a six-seater car produced by Italian automaker Fiat from 1998 to 2010. Based on the Bravo/Brava, the Multipla was shorter and wider than its rivals. It had two rows of three seats, where its compact MPV competitors had two across front seating. The Multipla is shorter than the three-door Bravo/Brava on which it was based, yet it offered increased seating and cargo volume. Sales commenced in Italy in November 1998.

In common with a number of other modern Fiats, the Multipla reused the name of an earlier vehicle, in this case the "Multipla" variant of the Fiat 600 produced during the 1950s and 1960s.

The Blupower variant was the first production CNG-only car, using four gas cylinders with a nominal total capacity of 35 kilograms (77 lb) of natural gas to provide approximately 670 kilometres (420 mi) of driving range. Unlike most newer CNG-only vehicles (e.g. the Opel Zafira ecoM or the Volkswagen Polo TGI) that take advantage of an EU-wide exemption for vehicles with a petrol tank smaller than 15 litres (3.3 imp gal; 4.0 US gal), the Multipla Blupower does not have a petrol system at all. More conventional bifuel models were also available, either as petrol/CNG (Bipower) or petrol/LPG with liquid gas injection (Gpower).

The Multipla was assembled and marketed in China from 2008 to 2013 under license by Zotye Auto as the Zotye M300 Langyue, using knock-down kits from Italy. Zotye also sold a total of 220 all-electric versions of the M300.

== Design ==
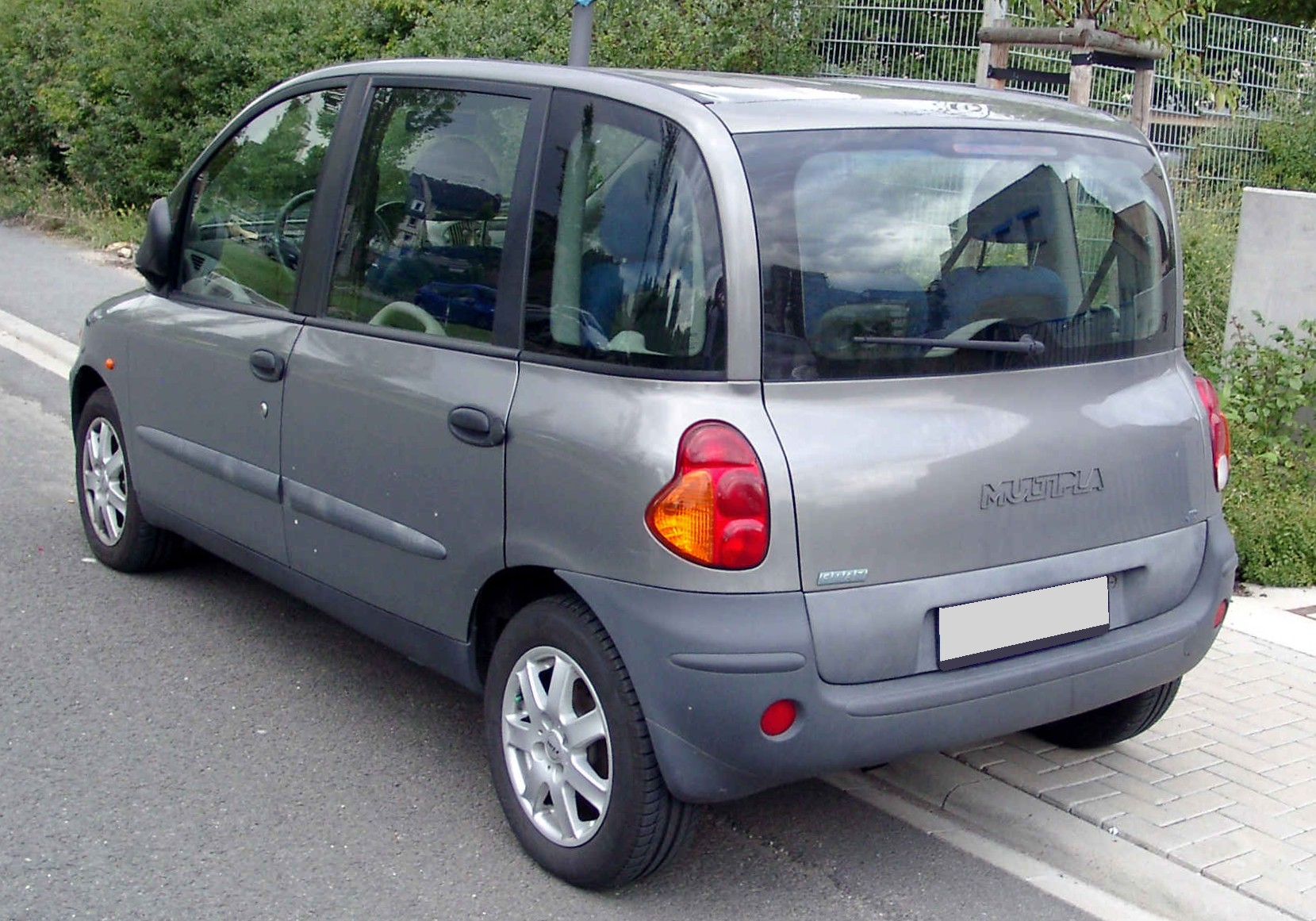
Series I Multipla (rear)

A first Multipla concept car was unveiled in at the Paris Motor Show in October 1996. The final production car was presented at the International Motor Show Germany in Frankfurt in the autumn of 1997.

The exterior and interior design of the Multipla were displayed at the Museum of Modern Art (MOMA) in New York during its "Different Roads – Automobiles for the Next Century" exhibition in 1999.

It won the Top Gear Car of the Year (2000). It was also voted Top Gear Magazine's Family Car of the Year for four years in a row, from 2001 to 2004. In July 2000, in the series finale of Clarkson's Car Years, it was awarded "Family Car of the Moment".

Multipla sales began in Italy in November 1998, with most other markets receiving it a year later. The Multipla sold well with Italian buyers, but sales elsewhere were less successful.

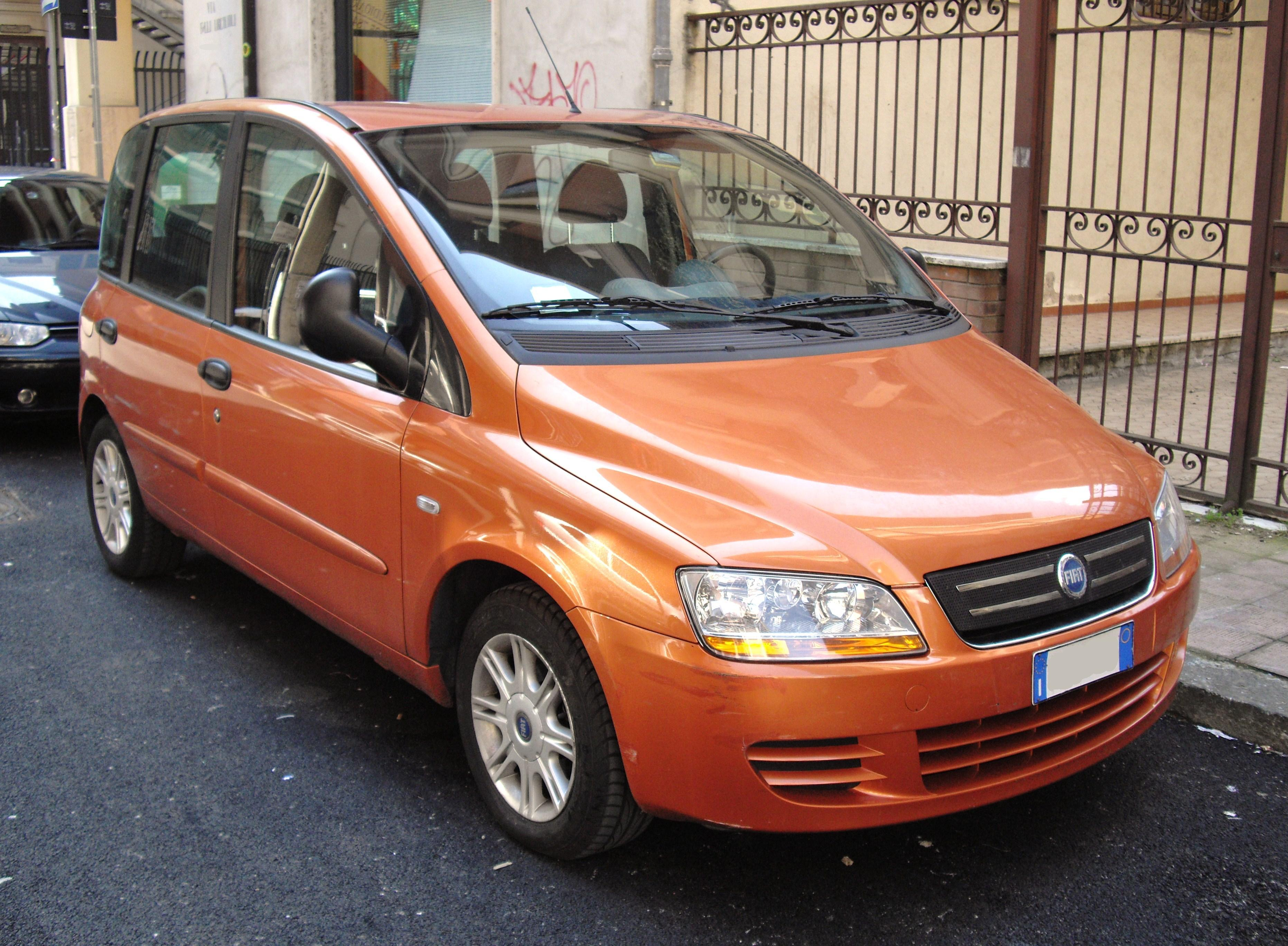
2004–10 Fiat Multipla (facelift) (front)

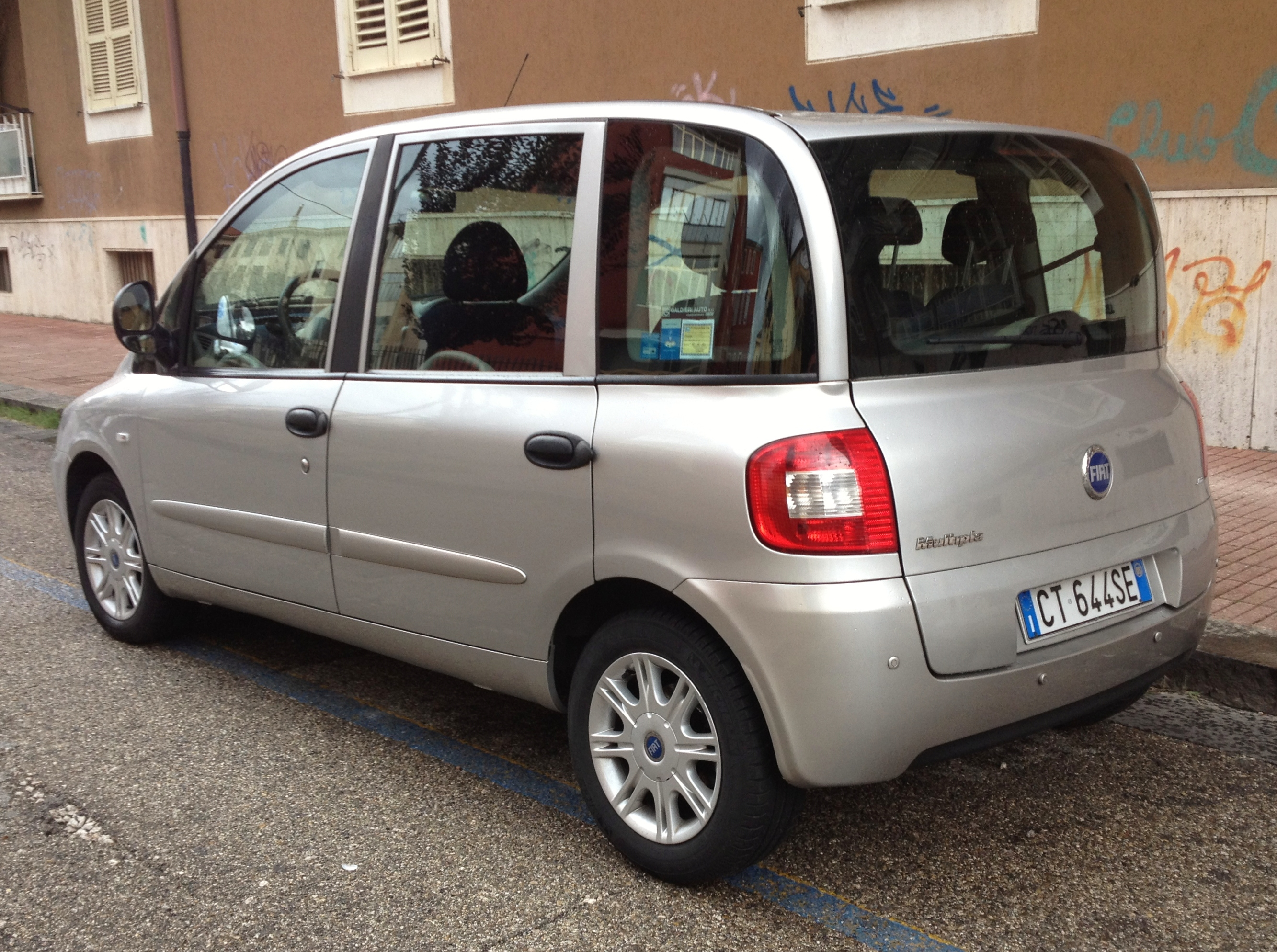
2004–10 Fiat Multipla (facelift) (rear)

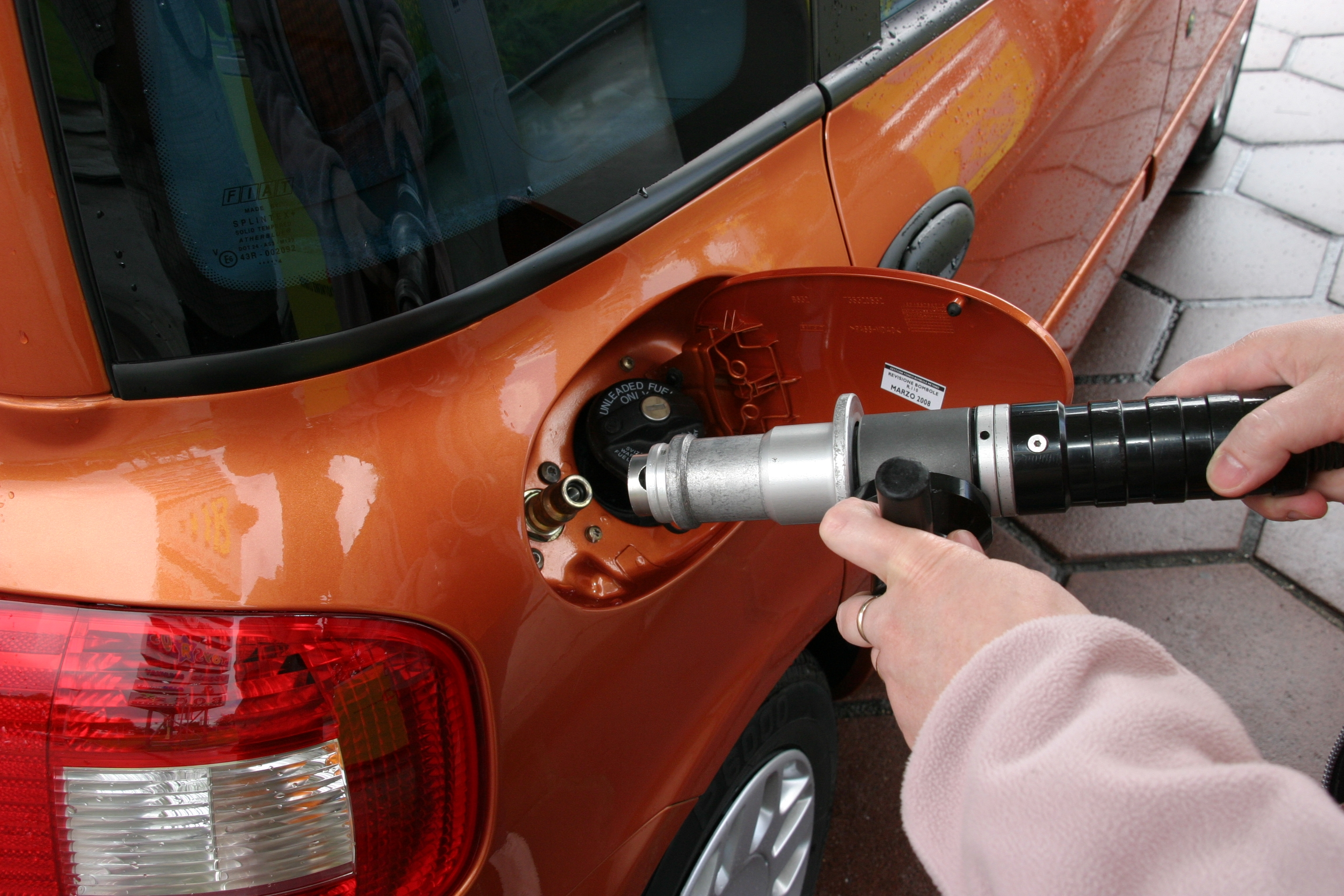
Fueling a Fiat Multipla with compressed natural gas

The Multipla underwent a major facelift in March 2004, in an attempt to shed its original styling for a more restrained look. This was with the intention of attracting more buyers, but failed to garner critical acclaim. Upon the subsequent restyling, The Daily Telegraph reported designers were "desperately sad that the new Multipla no longer resembles a psychotic cartoon duck," and "while passengers loved the adaptability of the clever interior, they were less keen on the sarcastic sneers and derisive laughter of their neighbours, friends and schoolmates; children can be cruel."

The Telegraph placed it #2 on its list of the 100 Ugliest Cars in August 2008, saying, "Derided for the blandness of its output during the 1980s and early 1990s, Fiat dared to start thinking outside the box. In this case, however, it simply added wheels to the box." The Multipla was also named the ugliest car of all time by readers of Car Throttle in January 2014. In February 2018, The Sunday Times named it on a list of ugliest cars, saying, "The tragedy of the Multipla is that its Elephant Man-esque exterior enclosed a genuinely clever and spacious interior, and it wasn't bad to drive, either. It's a shame, then, that you'd rather walk than be seen in it."

== Engines ==
A 1.6 L engine, which could be powered on either methane or standard petrol, was offered in certain markets.

Model	Engine	Displacement	Power	Torque	Years
100 16V	I4	1581 cc	106 PS (78 kW; 105 hp) at 5750 rpm	148 N⋅m (109 lb⋅ft) at 4000 rpm	1998–2000
100 16V	I4	1596 cc	103 PS (76 kW; 102 hp) at 5750 rpm	145 N⋅m (107 lb⋅ft) at 4000 rpm	2000–2010
105 JTD	I4	1910 cc	105 PS (77 kW; 104 hp) at 4000 rpm	200 N⋅m (148 lb⋅ft) at 1500 rpm	1998–2000
110 JTD	I4	1910 cc	110 PS (81 kW; 110 hp) at 4000 rpm	200 N⋅m (148 lb⋅ft) at 1500 rpm	2000–2001
115 JTD	I4	1910 cc	115 PS (85 kW; 113 hp) at 4000 rpm	203 N⋅m (150 lb⋅ft) at 1500 rpm	2001–2006
1.9 Multijet	I4	1910 cc	120 PS (88 kW; 120 hp) at 4000 rpm	206 N⋅m (152 lb⋅ft) at 1450 rpm	2006–2010
1.6 (Blupower) CNG	I4	1581 cc	95 PS (70 kW; 94 hp) at 5750 rpm	133 N⋅m (98 lb⋅ft) at 4000 rpm	1998–2002
1.6 (Bi-Power) CNG	I4	1581 cc	92 PS (68 kW; 91 hp) at 5750 rpm	130 N⋅m (96 lb⋅ft) at 4000 rpm	n/a

== Trim levels ==
=== United Kingdom ===
- Multipla SX: basic model available with petrol or diesel engines.
- Multipla ELX: added air conditioning, twin electric sunroofs, alloy wheels and electric rear windows, as well as special wipe-clean, brightly coloured seats.

In June 2004, when the Multipla received its facelift, these trim levels were later replaced with Dynamic, Dynamic Family, Dynamic Plus.

== Practicality ==
The new generation Multipla was praised by journalists at its launch for its flexibility. The Multipla's three abreast seating configuration allows for adjustment of the front seats, and the removal and relocation of the rear seats into many formats. It also affords a big 430 litres (15 cu ft) of luggage space, which can increase to 1,900 litres (67 cu ft) of flat floor load space, with the rear three seats removed from the vehicle.

== Zotye M300 ==
From December 2008 to September 2010, Zotye Auto had assembled Multipla 2 from KD kits, in its factory in Changshan, and marketed it in China as the Zotye Multiplan. In October 2010, Zotye started to build a version of Multipla 2, employing more locally made parts in order to reduce costs; the new version is called "Langyue" in China. There are 2 types: M300 (Engine powered) and M300 EV (see below) which is electric.

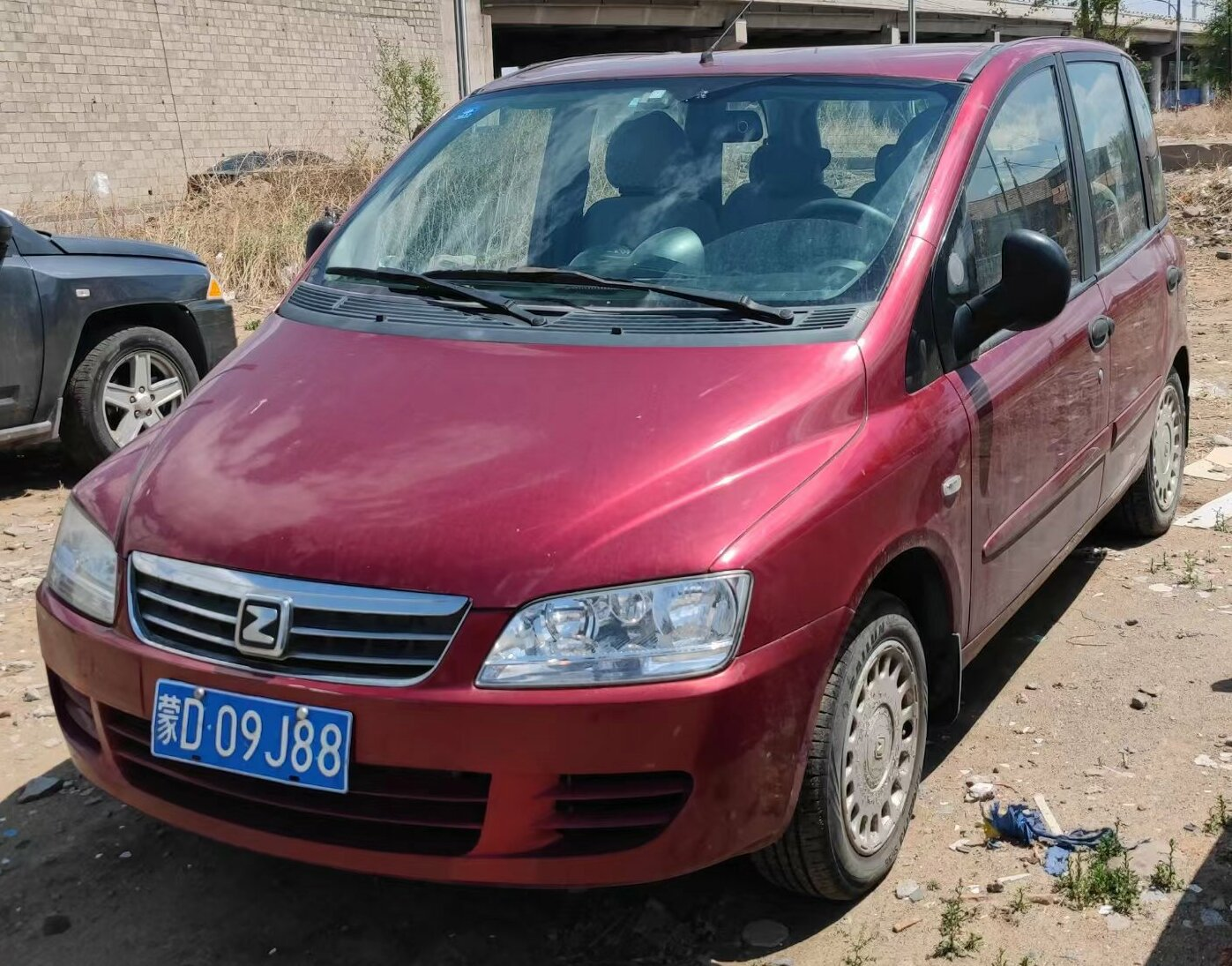
Zotye M300 (front view)

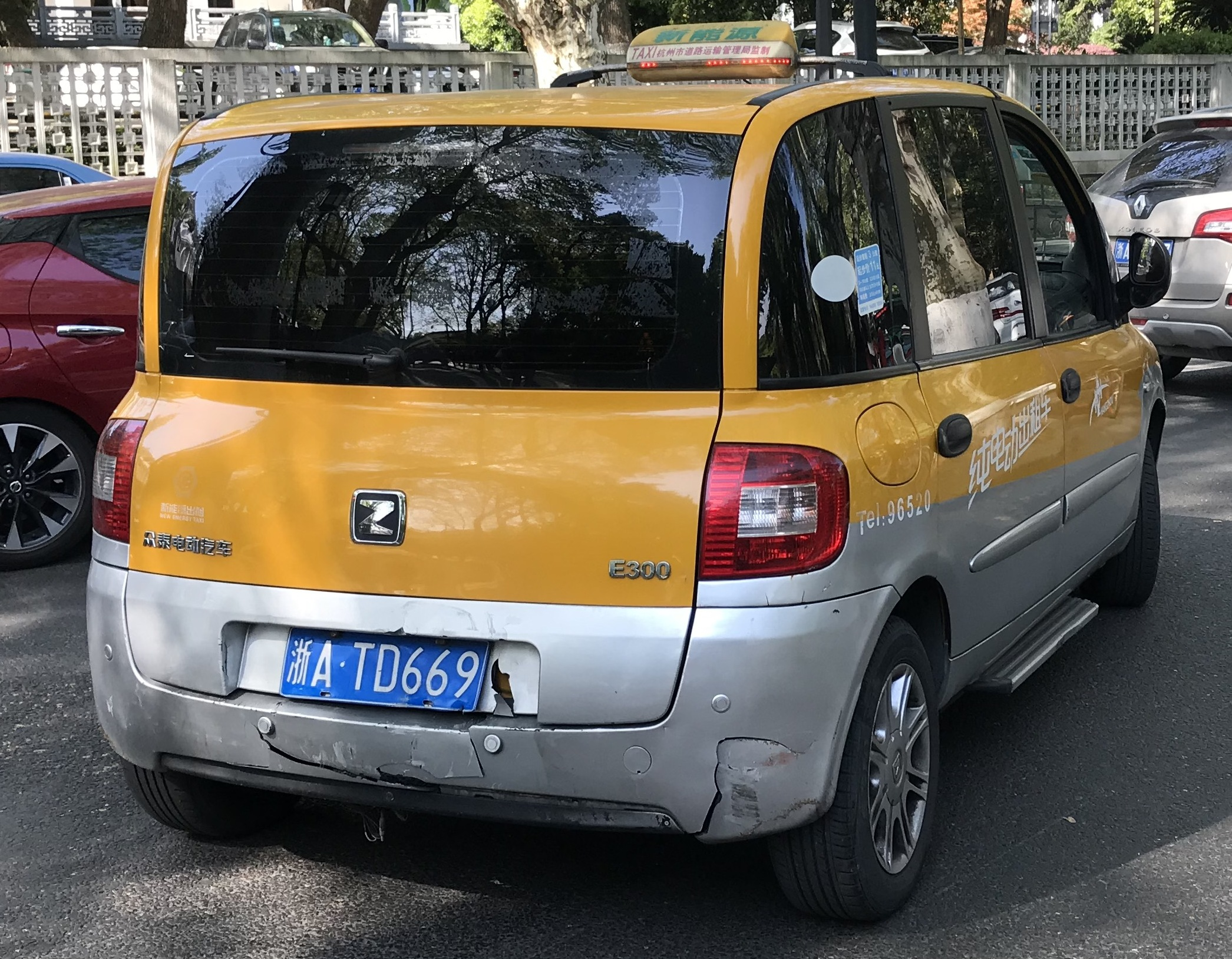
Zotye M300 EV (E300) taxi (rear view)

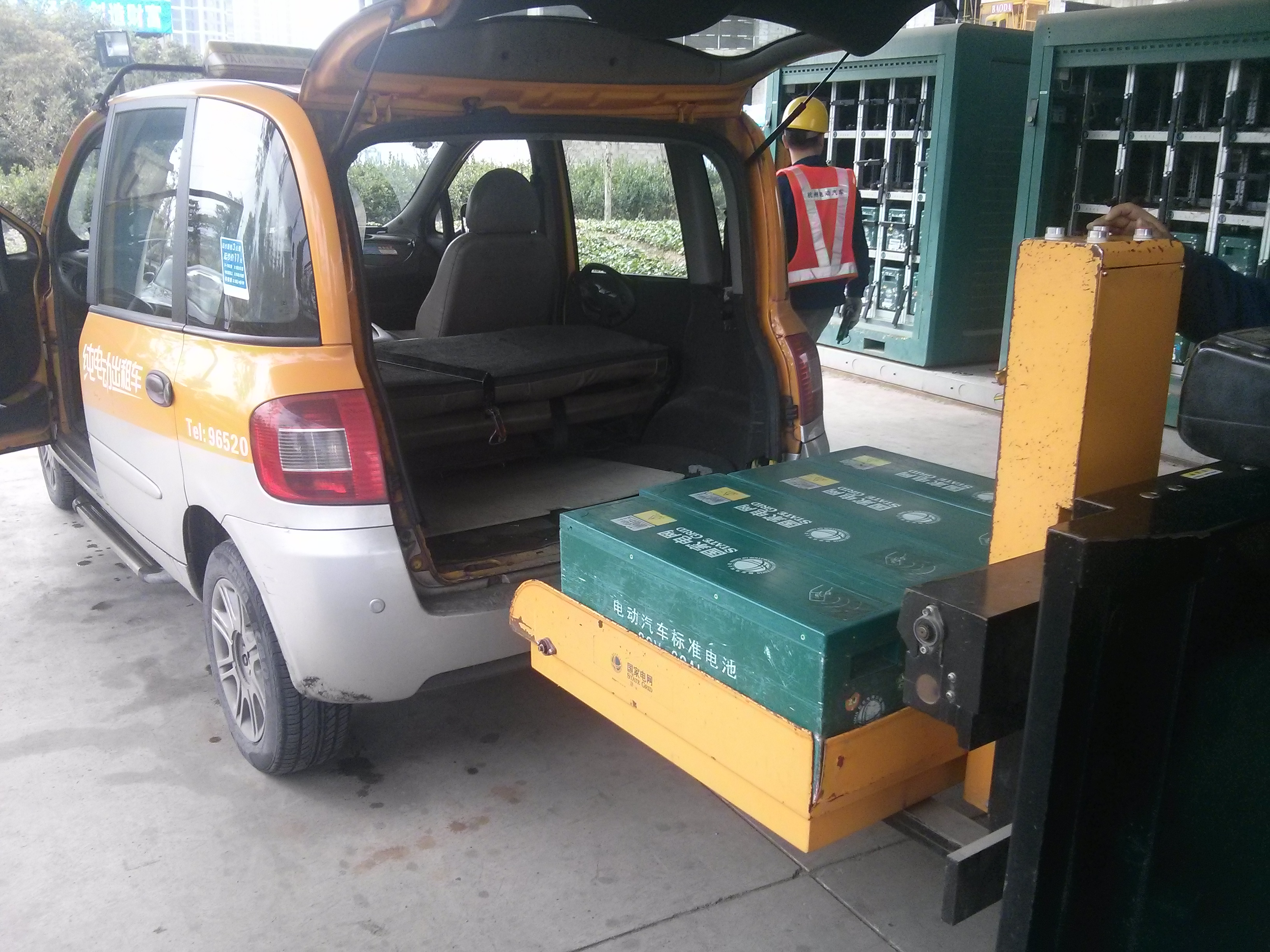
Zotye M300 EV (E300) battery swap
