= Uptown Theatre =

Uptown Theatre or Uptown Theater may refer to:

- Uptown Theatre (Toronto), demolished
- Uptown Theatre (Chicago), closed
- Uptown Theater (Napa, California)
- Uptown Theatre (Milwaukee), demolished
- Uptown Theater (Kansas City, Missouri)
- Uptown Theater (Minneapolis)
- Uptown Theater (Philadelphia)
- Uptown Theater (Washington, D.C.)
- Uptown Theater (Racine, Wisconsin)
- Uptown Theatre (Winnipeg), now Uptown Lofts
- Uptown Theatre (Utica, New York)

== See also ==
- Barrie Uptown Theater, Barrie, Ontario, Canada
