= Downton (surname) =

Downton is a surname. Notable people with the surname include:

- Andrew Downton (born 1977), Australian cricketer
- David Downton (born 1959), British fashion illustrator
- George Downton (1928–2014), English cricketer
- James V. Downton (born 1938), American sociologist
- John Downton (1906–1991), English artist
- Paul Downton (born 1957), English cricketer
- Paul F Downton, Australian architect
