= Midtown =

Midtown may refer to:

== Places within cities ==
=== Canada ===
- Midtown, Toronto, Ontario

=== Japan ===
- Tokyo Midtown

=== United States ===
Within the United States, Midtown most commonly refers to Midtown Manhattan in New York City. It may also refer to:

- Midtown, Agoura Hills, California
- Midtown Atlanta, Georgia
  - Midtown station (MARTA), a subway station near this area
- MidTown (Columbus, Georgia)
- Midtown Detroit, Michigan
- Midtown, Harrisburg, Pennsylvania
- Midtown, Houston, Texas
- Midtown, Memphis, Tennessee
- Midtown Miami, Florida
  - Midtown Interchange, an interchange in the aforementioned location
- Midtown, Minneapolis, Minnesota
- Midtown Oklahoma City, Oklahoma
- Midtown Omaha, Nebraska
- Midtown Phoenix, Arizona
- Midtown Sacramento, California
- Midtown San Antonio, comprising several neighborhoods of San Antonio, Texas
- Midtown San Jose, California
- Midtown St. Louis, Missouri

== Other uses ==
- Midtown (band), a pop punk band
- Midtown, Loch Ewe, a location in the Northwest Highlands of Scotland
- Midtown, Sutherland, a hamlet in the Scottish Highlands
- Midtown, Tennessee, U.S., an unincorporated community, formerly a town
- Midtown Madness, a racing game by Microsoft and Angel Studios
- Midtown Plaza (Rochester, New York), U.S., a shopping mall
- Midtown Plaza (Saskatoon), Canada, a shopping mall
