= International Engine of the Year =

Engine competition

The International Engine of the Year (IEY) was an annual competition for automotive industry internal combustion engines and electric motors, judged by a panel of automobile journalists from around the world. It is organised by UKi Media & Events' Automotive Magazines. The competition was started in 1999. The last competition was held in 2019. The 2020 competition was initially delayed due to COVID-19 and was never scheduled.

The award is determined by the panellists using "subjective driving impressions and technical knowledge, and took into account characteristics such as fuel economy, noise, smoothness, performance and driveability".

== Annual winners ==
Category	1999	2000	2001	2002	2003	2004	2005	2006	2007	2008	2009	2010	2011	2012	2013	2014	2015	2016	2017	2018	2019
International Engine of the Year	Toyota 1SZ-FE 1.0 L Yaris	Honda 1.0 L IMA; Insight	BMW S54 3.2 L M3	BMW N62 4.4 L Valvetronic	Mazda 1.3 L Renesis; RX-8	Toyota 1NZ-FXE 1.5 L Hybrid Synergy Drive; Prius	BMW S85B50; 5.0 L V10; M5/M6		BMW 3.0 L N54B30; Twin Turbo; 135i/335i/535i/X6		Volkswagen; 1.4 L TSI "Twincharger"; Golf/Scirocco/Jetta /Touran/Tiguan; SEAT Ibiza		Fiat; 875 cc TwinAir; Fiat 500	Ford 999 cc EcoBoost three-cylinder Turbo; Ford Focus/Fiesta/B-Max/C-Max/Grand C-Max			BMW B38 1.5 L three-cylinder (electric-gasoline hybrid); BMW i8 (362 ps)	Ferrari F154; 3.9L biturbo V8; Ferrari 488 (669 ps)			
Best New Engine	not awarded		BMW S54 3.2 L M3	BMW N62 4.4 L Valvetronic	Mazda 1.3 L Renesis; RX-8	Toyota 1NZ-FXE 1.5 L Hybrid Synergy Drive; Prius	BMW S85 5.0 L V10; M5/M6	Volkswagen; 1.4 L TSI "Twincharger"; Golf	BMW 3.0 L N54B30; Twin Turbo; 335i	BMW N47D 2.0 L Diesel Twin Turbo; 123d	Porsche; 3.8 L Flat Six; 911 Carrera S	Fiat; 1.4 L MultiAir Turbo; Alfa Romeo MiTo/Giulietta	Fiat; 875 cc TwinAir; Fiat 500	Ford 999 cc EcoBoost three-cylinder Turbo; Ford Focus	Volkswagen; 1.4 L TSI ACT; Golf	Mercedes-AMG; 2-litre turbo M133; A45, CLA45, GLA45(360ps)	BMW B38 1.5 L three-cylinder (electric-gasoline hybrid); BMW i8	Ferrari F154 3.9L biturbo V8; Ferrari 488	Honda 3.5L V6 electric gasoline hybrid Honda NSX	Ferrari F140 6.5L V12; Ferrari 812 Superfast	Jaguar Land Rover full-electric powertrain (Jaguar I-Pace)
Best Performance Engine	not awarded				Mercedes-AMG M113 E55ML 5.4 L CL55/E55/S55/SL55	Mercedes-AMG M275 6.0 L V12; S65/CL65/SL65	BMW S85B50 5.0 L V10; M5/M6			Porsche; 3.6 L Turbo; 911 Turbo/ GT2	Mercedes-AMG; M156 6.2 L V8; C63/S63/SL63/CL63/E63/CLS63/ML63		Ferrari F136 FB; 4.5 L V8; 458 Italia/458 Spider		Ferrari; F140 FC 6.3 L V12; Ferrari F12berlinetta	Ferrari F136; 4.5 L V8; 458 Italia/458 Spider/458 Speciale		Ferrari F154; 3.9L biturbo V8; Ferrari 488 (669 ps)			Ferrari 3.9-litre biturbo V8 (Ferrari 488 GTB, 488 Spider, 488 Pista)
Sub 150PS	not awarded																				Ford 999cc three-cylinder turbo (Ford Fiesta, Focus, C-Max, Grand C-Max, Mondeo, EcoSport)
150PS to 250PS	not awarded																				Audi 2-litre four-cylinder TFSI (Audi TT, TT S, S1, S3, A3, A4, A5, A6, Q2, Q3, Q5; SEAT León Cupra, Alhambra, Ateca, Cupra Ateca; Škoda Superb, Kodiaq; Volkswagen Golf GTi, Polo GTi, T-Roc, Atlas, Passat, Arteon, CC, Beetle, Tiguan, Sharan)
250PS to 350PS	not awarded																				Porsche 2.5-litre turbo (Porsche 718 Boxster S, 718 Cayman S)
350PS to 450PS	not awarded																				Jaguar Land Rover full-electric powertrain (Jaguar I-Pace)
450PS to 550PS	not awarded																				Mercedes-AMG 4-litre biturbo V8 (Mercedes-AMG GT, GT S, GT C, GT R, S, C, E, G, GLC, Maybach S, Aston Martin Vantage, DB11)
550PS to 650PS	not awarded																				Ferrari 3.9-litre biturbo V8 (Ferrari Portofino, GTC4 Lusso T)
Above 650PS	not awarded																				Ferrari 3.9-litre biturbo V8 (Ferrari 488 GTB, 488 Spider, 488 Pista)
Best Electric Powertrain	not awarded																			Tesla; Full-electric powertrain Model S, Model X, Model 3	Jaguar Land Rover full-electric powertrain (Jaguar I-Pace)
Best Hybrid Powertrain	not awarded																				BMW 1.5-litre three-cylinder electric-gasoline hybrid (BMW i8)
Category	1999	2000	2001	2002	2003	2004	2005	2006	2007	2008	2009	2010	2011	2012	2013	2014	2015	2016	2017	2018	2019

== Old categories ==
Category	1999	2000	2001	2002	2003	2004	2005	2006	2007	2008	2009	2010	2011	2012	2013	2014	2015	2016	2017	2018
Best Fuel Economy / Green Engine	Volkswagen; 1.2 L TDI 3L	Honda 1.0 L IMA; Insight			Honda 1.3 L IMA; Civic	Toyota 1NZ-FXE 1.5 L Hybrid Synergy Drive; Prius					Volkswagen; 1.4 L TSI "Twincharger"; Golf/Scirocco/Jetta /Touran/Tiguan; SEAT Ibiza	Toyota; 2ZR-FXE; 1.8 L Hybrid; Toyota Prius/Auris	Fiat; 875 cc TwinAir; Fiat 500	GM 1.4 L Ecotec range extender Chevrolet Volt, Opel Ampera	Fiat; 875 cc TwinAir CNG; Fiat 500L, Panda; Lancia Ypsilon	Tesla; Full-electric powertrain Model S, Model X, Model 3				
Sub 1 litre	Toyota 1SZ-FE 1.0 L Yaris	Honda 1.0 L IMA; Insight							Toyota 1KR-FE; 1.0 L 3-Cylinder VVT-i; Aygo/IQ/Yaris/Citroën C1/Peugeot 107				Fiat; 875 cc TwinAir; Fiat 500	Ford 999 cc EcoBoost three-cylinder Turbo; Ford Focus/Fiesta/B-Max/C-Max/Grand C-Max/Mondeo/Ecosport						Volkswagen 1.0L Three-cylinder turbo Volkswagen Up/Polo/Golf/T-Roc, Audi A1/A3/Q2, Seat Ibiza/Arona/Toledo/Ateca/Leon, Škoda Fabia/Rapid/Karoq/Scala
1.0 litre to 1.4 litre	Volkswagen 1.2 L TDI 3L	Toyota 2NZ-FE 1.3 L VVT-i	Volkswagen; 1.4 L TDI	Honda 1.3 L IMA; Civic			Fiat SDE; 1.3 L MultiJet	Volkswagen 1.4 L TSI Twincharger; VW Polo, Beetle, Golf, Golf Plus, Golf Cabriolet, Scirocco, Eos, Jetta, Tiguan, Sharan, Touran, CrossTouran, CrossTouran CNG, Passat CNG; Audi A1, Audi A3; SEAT Ibiza FR, Ibiza Cupra, Ibiza Cupra Boncanegra, Leon Cupra, Alhambra; Škoda Fabia RS									PSA Peugeot Citroën 1.2 L Three-cylinder turbo Peugeot 208, 2008, 308, 3008, 5008; Citroën C3, C3 Aircross, C4, C4 Cactus, C4 Picasso / Grand Picasso, C-Elysée; DS DS 3, DS 4 Opel Crossland X, Grandland X			
1.4 litre to 1.8 litre	Toyota 1NZ-FXE Hybrid; Prius	Honda Accord 1.8 L	BMW N42 1.8 L Valvetronic	Toyota; 2ZZ-GE; 1.8 L VVTL-i; Celica/Corolla /Elise/Exige	BMW Tritec engine 1.6 L Supercharged; MINI Cooper S	Toyota 1NZ-FXE; 1.5 L Hybrid Synergy Drive; Prius			BMW–PSA Prince engine 1.6 L Turbo; MINI Hatchback, Clubman, Countryman, Coupe/Roadster; Peugeot 207,207 CC, 208, 308,308 CC, RCZ, 3008, 508, 5008; Citroën C5, DS3, DS3 Racing, DS4, DS4 Racing, DS5, C4 Picasso, Grand Picasso								BMW B38 1.5 L three-cylinder (electric-gasoline hybrid); BMW i8			
1.8 litre to 2.0 litre	Volkswagen 1.9 L 110PS TDI	Honda S2000 2.0 L					Volkswagen; 2.0 L FSI Turbo; Eos/Jetta/Golf GTI/Scirocco/Audi A3/A4/A6/TT/ SEAT Altea/Leon/Škoda Octavia				Audi; 2.0 L TFSI; A4/A5/Q5/VW Golf GTI	BMW N47D; 2.0 L Diesel Twin Turbo; 123d/X1 XDrive23d		BMW; N20B20 2.0 L turbo 125i/320i/328i/520i/ Z4 20i/Z4 s Drive 28i/ X1 20i/X1 28i/X3 20i		Mercedes-AMG; 2-litre turbo M133; A45, CLA45, GLA45(381ps)			Porsche; 2-litre turbo 718 Boxster/Cayman	
2.0 litre to 2.5 litre	Audi 2.5 L V6 TDI; A4/A6/A8	Alfa Romeo 2.5 L V6; 156/166	PSA Peugeot Citroën; DW12 2.2 L HDi; C5/607		BMW M54 2.5 L 325i/X3/525i/Z4		Honda 2.2 L i-CTDi	Subaru 2.5 L turbo EJ255; Impreza/ Forester/ Legacy GT/ 9-2X	BMW 2.5 L N52B25; 325/525/X3/Z4	Subaru EJ257; 2.5 L Boxer Turbo; Forester/Impreza	Mercedes-Benz; OM651 2.1 L Diesel BlueEfficiency; C250 CDi/E200 CDi, E220 CDi, E250 CDi	Audi; 2.5 L 20v Five-Cylinder Turbo; Audi TT RS/Audi RS3 Sportback/Audi RSQ3								
2.5 litre to 3.0 litre	BMW M57D30 2.9 L				Mazda 1.3 L Renesis; RX-8		BMW M57TUD30 3.0 L Twin-Turbo; 535d		BMW 3.0 L N54B30; Twin Turbo; 135i/1 M Coupe/335i/335is/535i/ X3 35i/X5 35i/X6 35i/Z4/740i						Porsche; 2.7 L DI; Boxster/Cayman	BMW; 3-litre twin-power turbo six-cylinder gasoline N55; 135i/235i/335i/335is/535i/640i/X3 35i/X5 35i/X6 35i/Z4/740i	BMW S55B30T0; BMW M3, M4	Porsche; 3.0 L Twin Turbo; 911 Carrera/911 Carrera 4/911 Carrera S/911 Carrera 4S, Carrera GTS, Carrera 4 GTS		
3.0 litre to 4.0 litre	BMW M67D39 3.9 L V8; E38 740d		BMW S54B32 3.2 L M3						Porsche; 3.6 L turbo 911 Turbo	BMW S65B40 4.0 L V8; M3					McLaren M838T; 3.8 L V8; MP4-12C/650S/P1			Ferrari F154; 3.9L biturbo V8; Ferrari 488 (669 ps)		
Above 4.0 litre	BMW M73 5.4 L V12	Ferrari F133 5.5 L V12; 456/550		BMW N62B44 4.4 L Valvetronic	Volkswagen 5.0 L V10 TDI; Touareg / Phaeton		BMW S85B50 5.0 L V10; M5/M6				Mercedes-AMG; M156 6.2 L V8; C63/S63/SL63/CL63/E63/CLS63/ML63		Ferrari F136 FB; 4.5 L V8; 458 Italia/458 Spider		Ferrari; F140 FC 6.3 L V12; Ferrari F12berlinetta	Ferrari F136; 4.5 L V8; 458 Italia/458 Spider/458 Speciale		Ferrari; F140 FC 6.3 L V12; Ferrari F12 tdf (780ps)		Ferrari F140 6.5L V12; Ferrari 812 Superfast
Best Concept	DaimlerChrysler Necar 4		Saab SVC	GM AUTOnomy	not awarded															
Best Eco- friendly	Toyota 1NZ-FXE Prius Hybrid		not awarded																	
Category	1999	2000	2001	2002	2003	2004	2005	2006	2007	2008	2009	2010	2011	2012	2013	2014	2015	2016	2017	2018

== Rankings ==
Number of times the following makes have received the award:

Make	Awards	Notes
BMW	62	including Tritec engine
Volkswagen/Audi	36	
Ferrari	26	
Honda	23	
Toyota	22	
Daimler/Mercedes-Benz	13	
Ford	9	
BMW-PSA Peugeot Citroën	9	
Porsche	9	
Fiat/Alfa Romeo	8	
Tesla Motors	7	
PSA Peugeot Citroën	6	
Mazda	4	
GM/Saab	3	
McLaren	3	
Subaru	2	

== See also ==
- List of motor vehicle awards
- Ward's 10 Best Engines
- PACE Award
- World Car of the Year
- International Car of the Year
- Autobest
