= Alfa Romeo MiTo =

Italian supermini hatchback

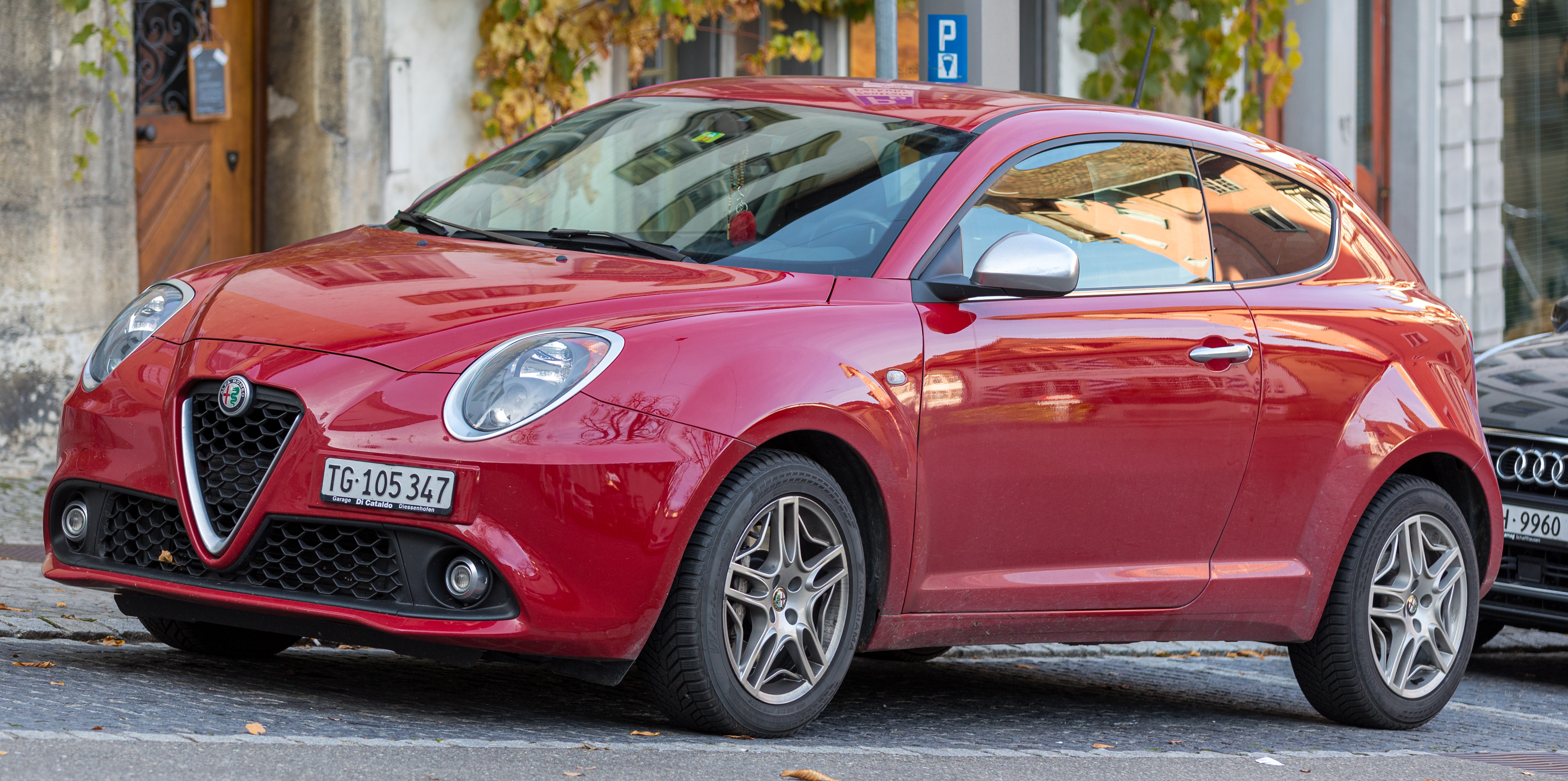

Overview
- Manufacturer: Alfa Romeo (Note: Fiat Group Automobiles (2008–2014) FCA Italy (2014–2020))
- Model code: 955
- Production: 2008–2020
- Assembly: Italy: Turin (Stabilimento Mirafiori)
- Designer: Juan Manuel Diaz at Centro Stile Alfa Romeo

Body and chassis
- Class: Supermini (B)
- Body style: 3-door hatchback
- Layout: Front-engine, front-wheel-drive
- Platform: GM Fiat Small platform
- Related: Fiat Grande Punto; Opel Corsa D

Powertrain
- Engine: 0.9 L TwinAir I2 (t/c petrol); 1.4 L MPI MultiAir I4 (petrol); 1.4 L FIRE I4 (t/c petrol); 1.4 L Turbo GPL I4 (t/c petrol/LPG); 1.4 L MultiAir I4 (t/c petrol); 1.3 L JTDm I4 (turbodiesel); 1.6 L JTDm I4 (turbodiesel)
- Transmission: 5-speed manual; 6-speed manual; 6-speed FPT C635 dual dry clutch

Dimensions
- Wheelbase: 2,511 mm (98.9 in)
- Length: 4,063 mm (160.0 in)
- Width: 1,721 mm (67.8 in)
- Height: 1,446 mm (56.9 in)
- Kerb weight: 1,080–1,205 kg (2,381–2,657 lb)

Chronology
- Successor: Alfa Romeo Junior

The Alfa Romeo MiTo (Type 955) is a supermini car which was made by Fiat Group Automobiles (Note: Later FCA Italy) from 2008 until 2020 and sold under the Alfa Romeo marque. It is a three-door hatchback with a front-engine, front-wheel-drive layout and shares its SCCS platform with the Fiat Grande Punto. The MiTo has a single generation, with 293,428 units produced at the Fiat Mirafiori factory. It was designed by Centro Stile Alfa Romeo, with the Mito nameplate being a portmanteau of the Italian cities of Milano (Milan), where it was designed, and Torino (Turin), where it was manufactured.

== Name ==
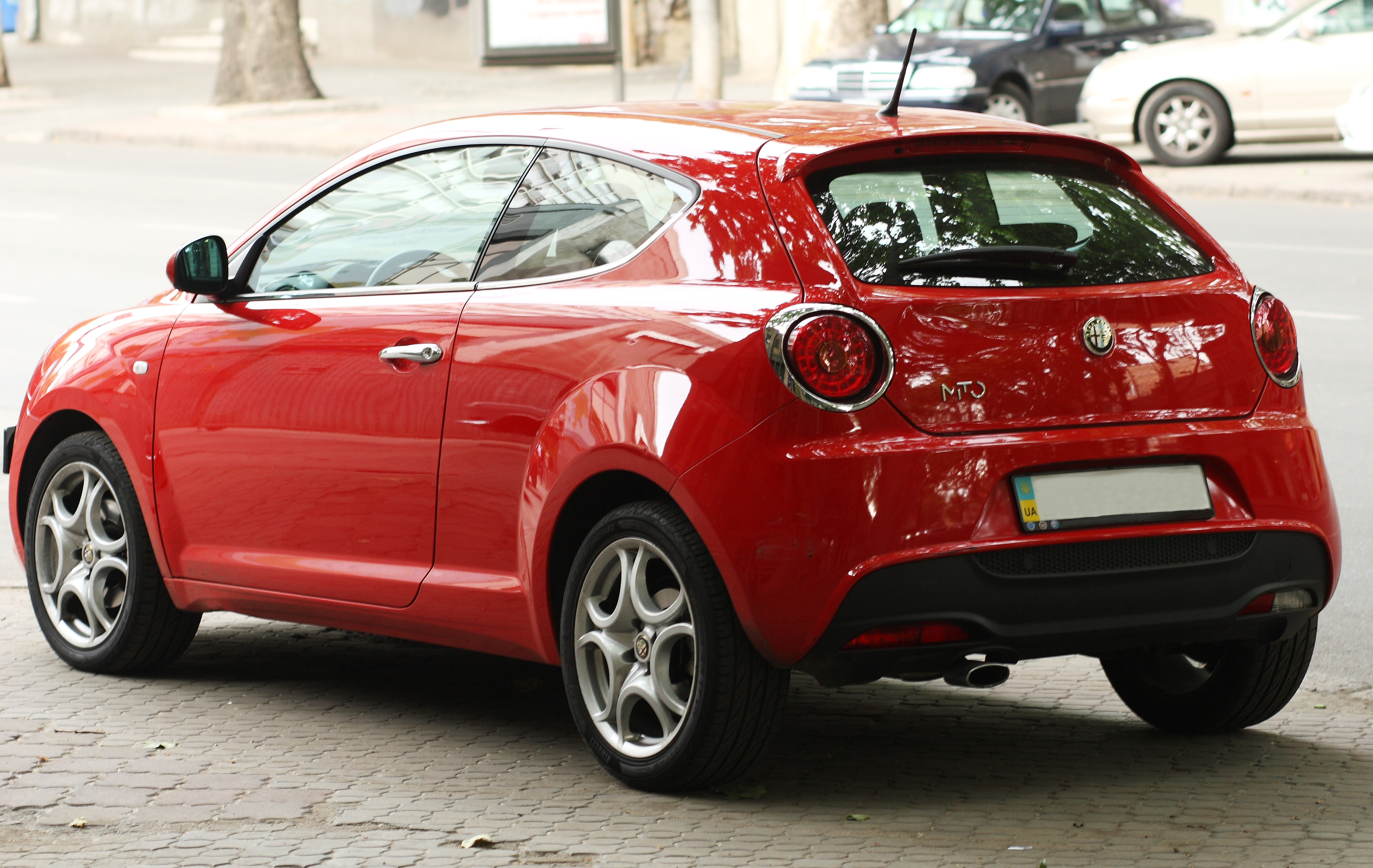
Rear view

During development, the new car was provisionally named Junior. In November 2007, Alfa Romeo launched a European public naming competition, wherein the winner from each country would win an Alfa Romeo Spider or an Alfa Romeo mountain bike. The winning name was "Furiosa", which scored well in Italy, France, the United Kingdom, and Germany, but not in Spain.

In 2008, Alfa Romeo announced "MiTo" as the official name, a portmanteau of Milano and Torino, the car having been designed in the former and assembled in the latter. The name is also a play on the Italian word mito, meaning "myth" or "legend".

== Design ==
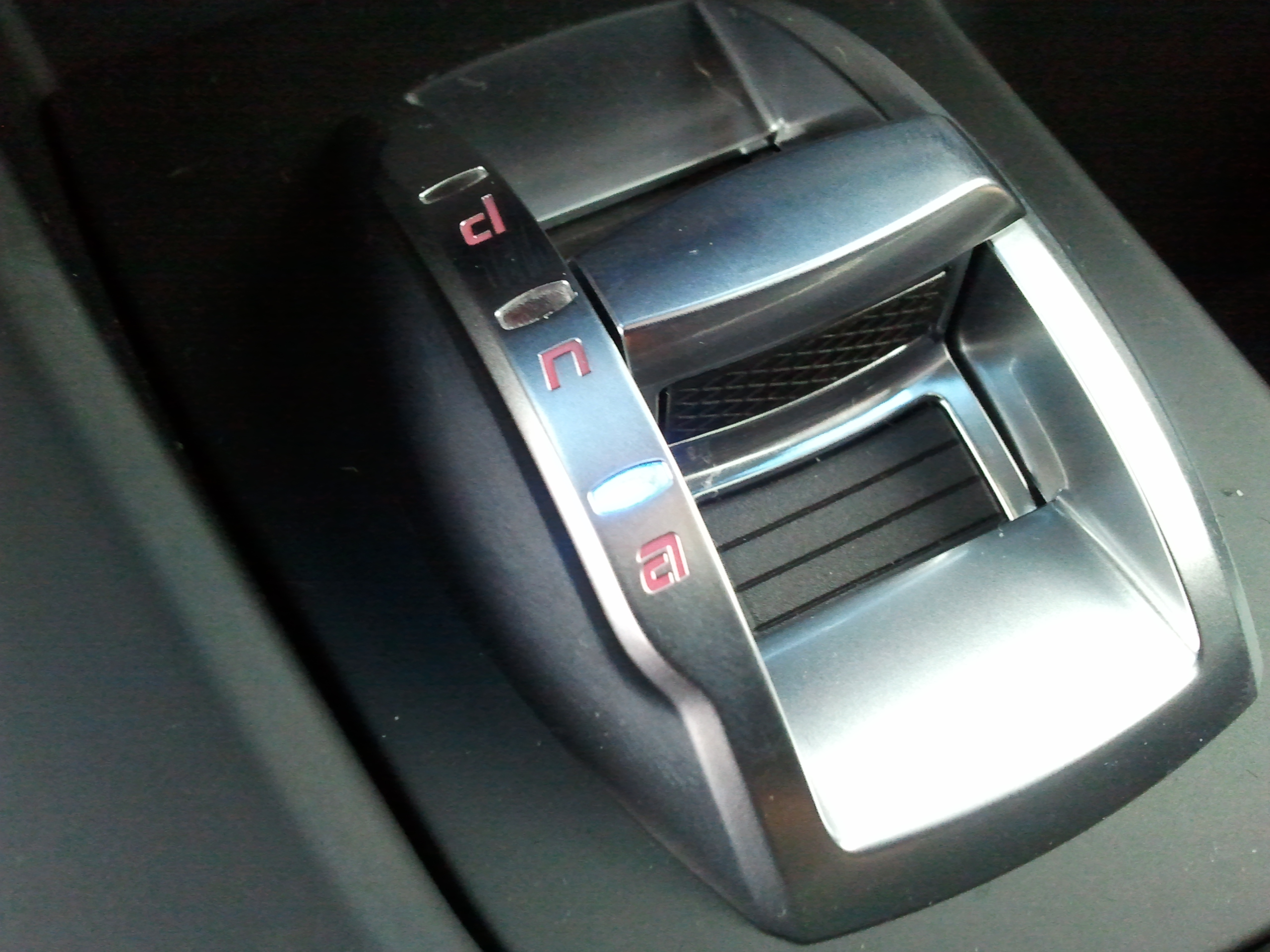
"Alfa DNA" switch

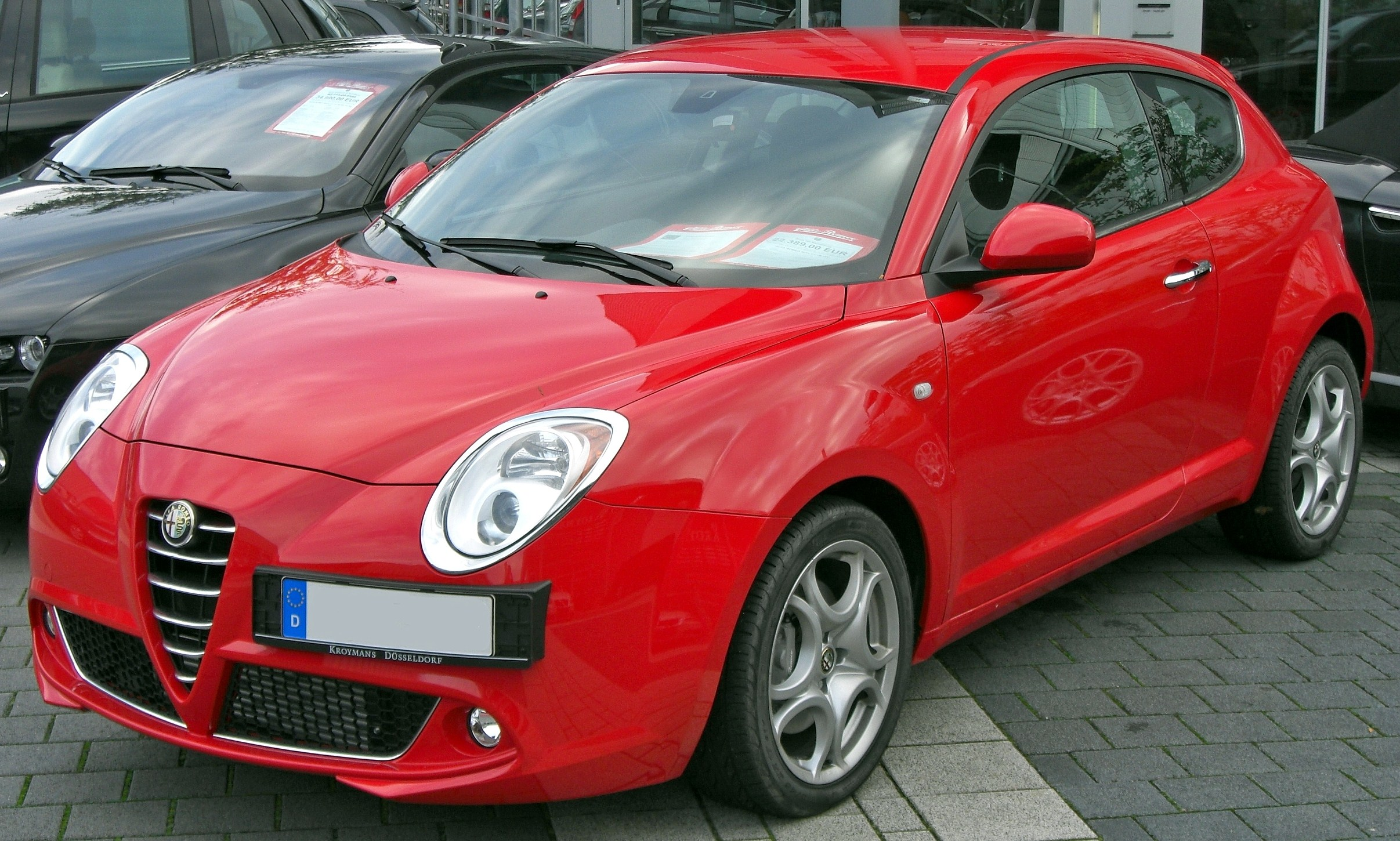
2008 model

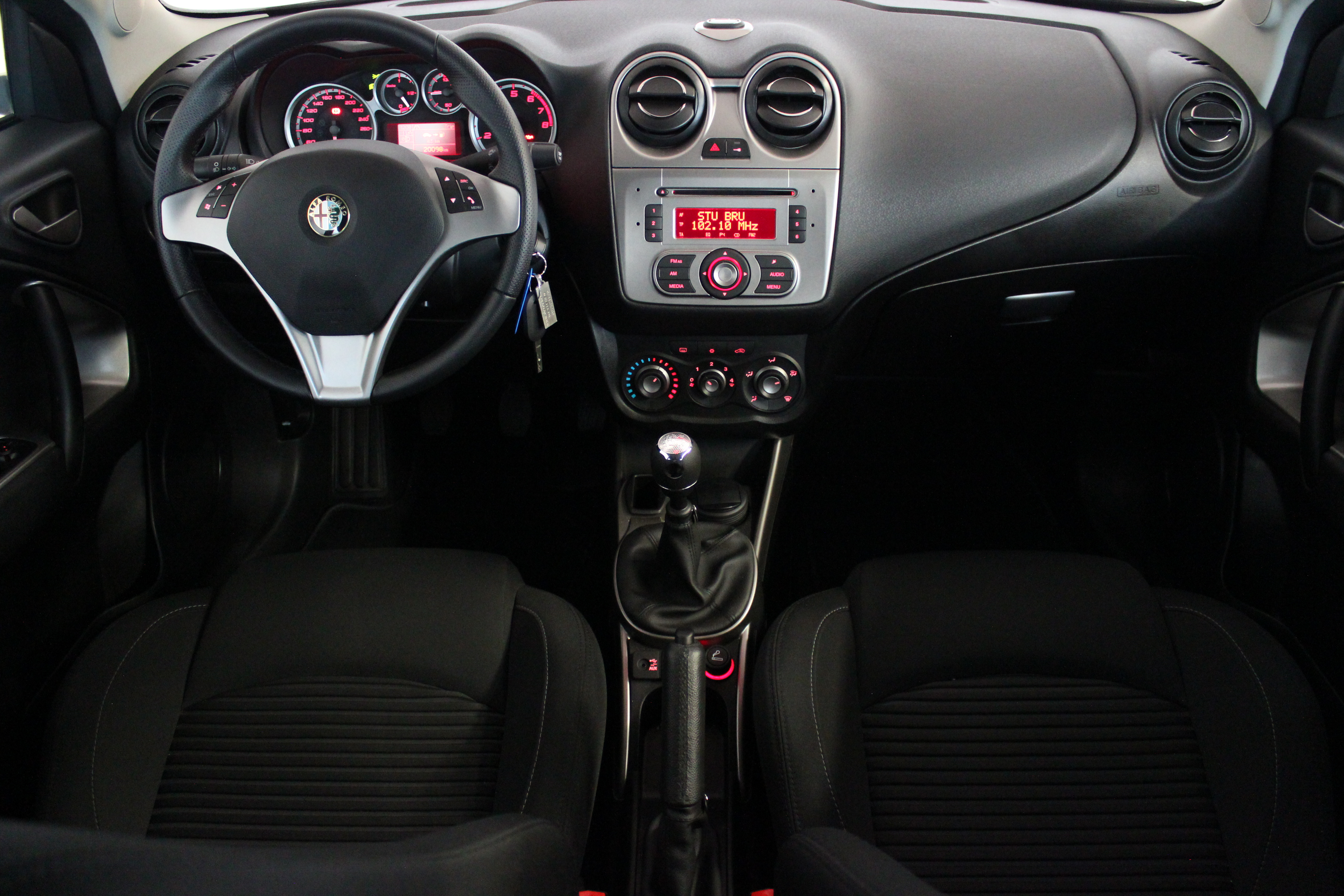
Interior

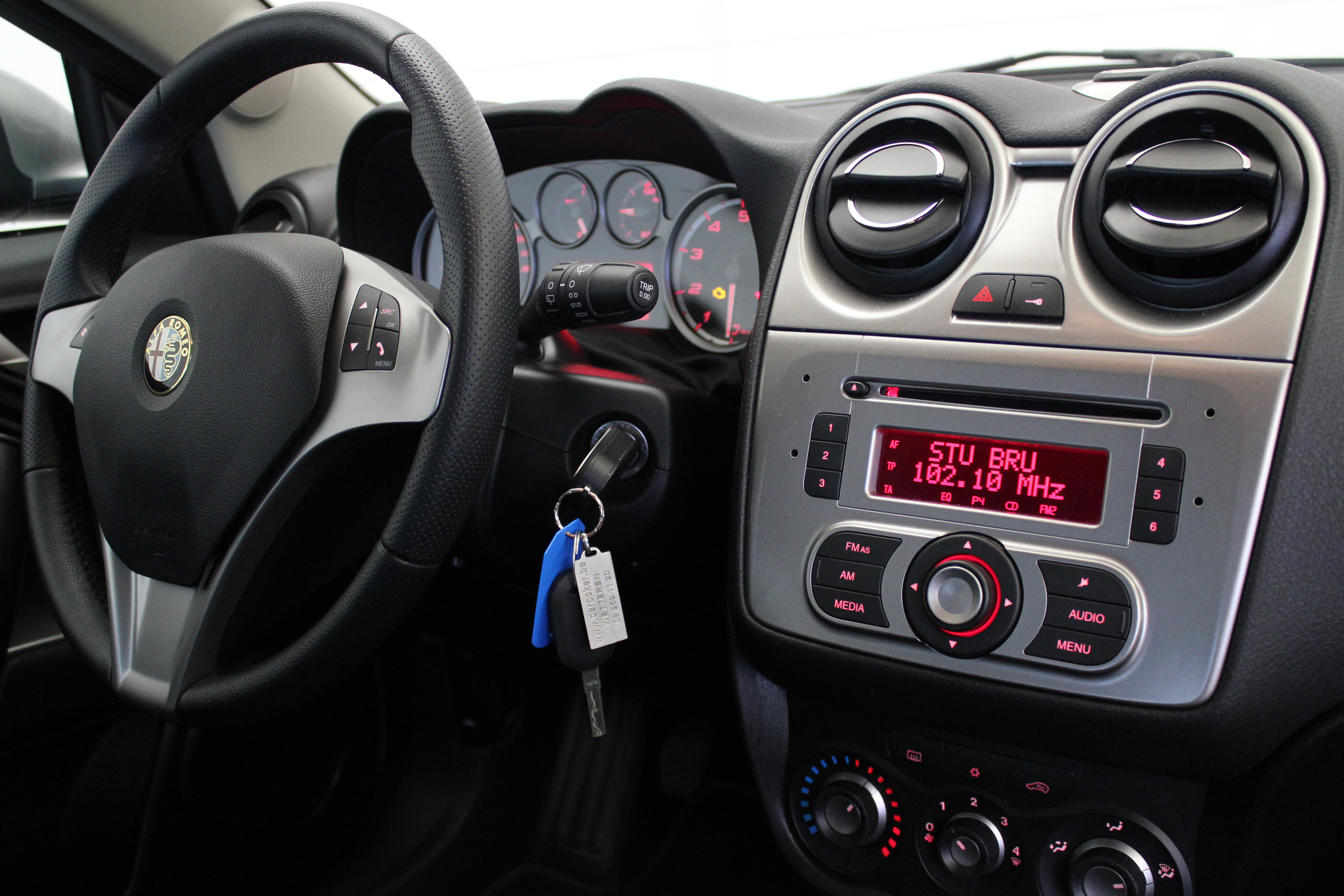
Steering wheel

The MiTo was first presented in 2008 at Castello Sforzesco in Milan, with an international introduction at the 2008 British Motor Show. It is front-wheel drive, with a system allowing the driver to choose three driving settings: Dynamic, Normal, and All-Weather. The system, marketed as "Alfa DNA", tunes the behavior of the engine, brakes, steering, suspension and gearbox. The MiTo also features LED tail lights and 250 litres (8.8 cu ft) of luggage space, as well as an electronic "Q2" differential on the front axle which activates with the Dynamic driving mode, allowing for faster and tighter cornering without loss of traction.

In 2010, a new transmission for the MiTo—the six-speed TCT dual-clutch transmission—was unveiled at the 2010 Geneva Motor Show. Produced by Fiat Powertrain Technologies (FPT) in Verrone, it has a Magneti Marelli control system integrating a BorgWarner hydraulic actuation module into its own power and transmission control units. It can handle torque inputs of up to 350 N⋅m (258 lbf⋅ft). Also unveiled at Geneva that year was "Blue&Me–TomTom", a new Blue&Me infotainment system with integrated TomTom navigation.

For model year 2014, the MiTo received a new turbocharged 105 PS (77 kW) 0.9 L TwinAir inline-twin engine, a new chrome-plated grille, a new Anthracite Grey paint colour, and new burnished front light clusters. The interior was also updated, with new upholstery, three new dashboard options, and a new Uconnect 5.0 infotainment system. The engine range now consisted of two turbo-diesel engines (the updated E5+ 85 PS (63 kW) 1.3 L JTDm, and the 120 PS (88 kW) 1.6 L JTDm), five petrol engines (the 70 PS (51 kW) 1.4, the 78 PS (57 kW) 1.4, the 135 PS (99 kW) 1.4 MultiAir Turbo (with manual or TCT options), and the 170 PS (125 kW) 1.4 MultiAir Turbo), and a 120 PS (88 kW) 1.4 Turbo liquefied petroleum gas (LPG) engine.

Debuting at the 2016 Geneva Motor Show, the facelifted MiTo featured a reworked front fascia with a new logo badge and new lettering. The trim lineup was changed to MiTo, Super, and Veloce. A new body colour and new wheel options also became available. The previous MiTo QV became the Mito Veloce, available with the 170 PS (125 kW) engine and TCT transmission.

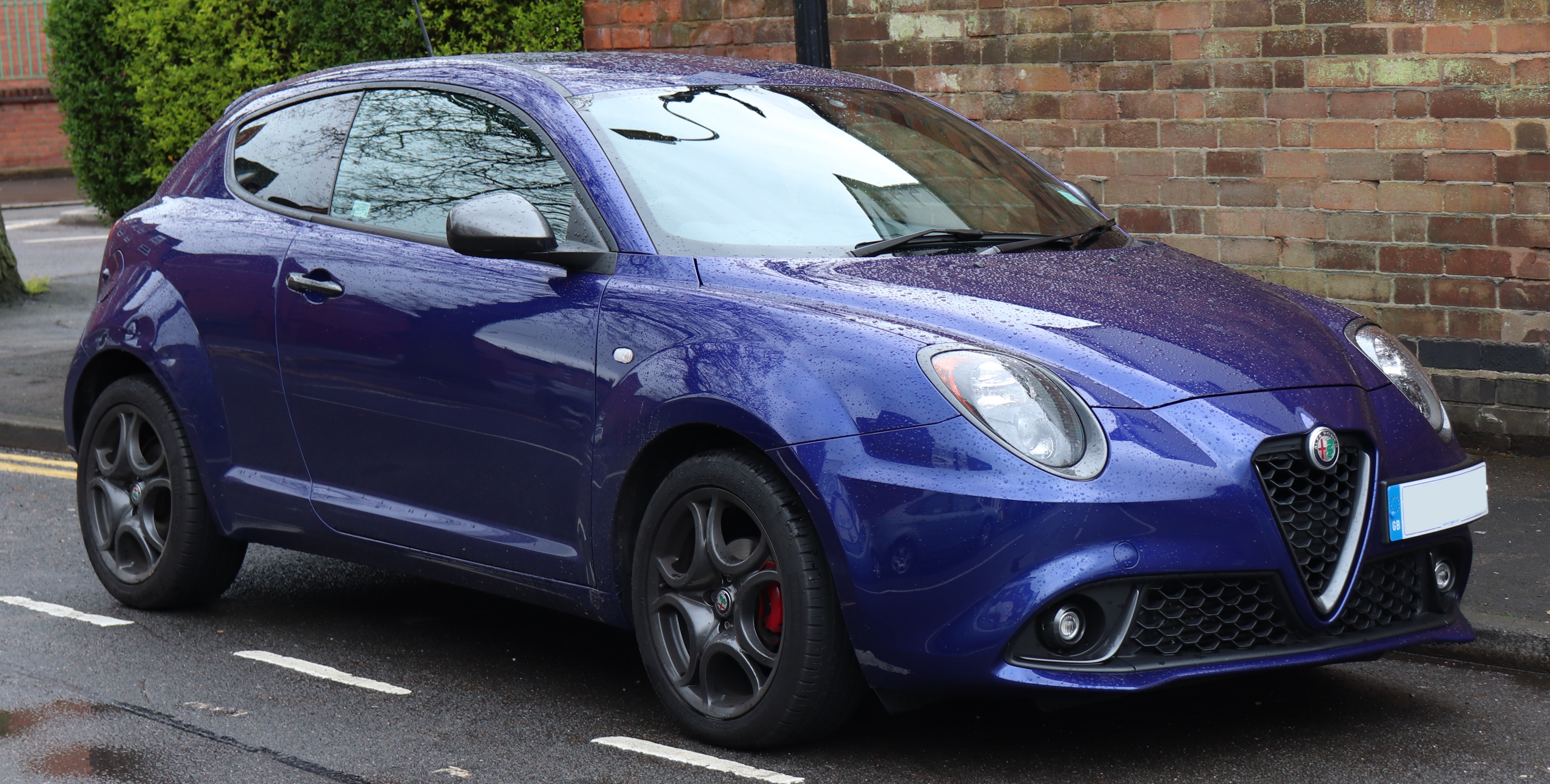
2016 facelift

=== MiTo Quadrifoglio Verde ===
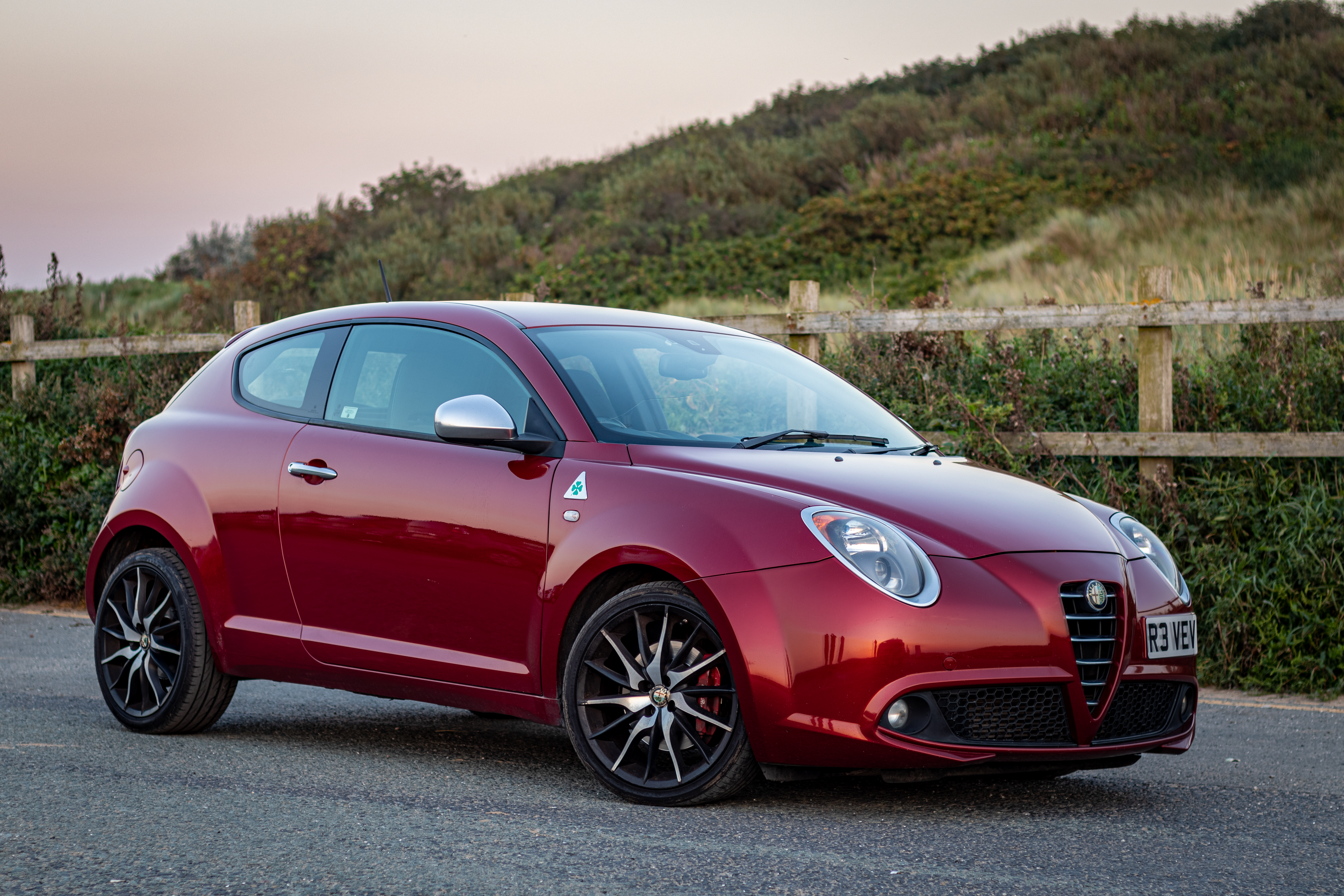
2012 MiTo Quadrifoglio Verde with Sabelt seats

The special-edition MiTo Quadrifoglio Verde ("green four-leaf clover"), first presented at the 2009 Frankfurt Motor Show, came equipped with a turbocharged 1.4-litre (1,368 cc) MultiAir inline-four engine capable of 170 PS (125 kW; 168 hp) at 5500 rpm and 250 N⋅m (184 lbf⋅ft) of torque at 2500 rpm, with newly engineered suspension, steering, and a new C635 6-speed gearbox developed by FPT. The MiTo QV had bigger 305 mm front brake discs and exclusive 18" alloy wheels as standard, and Sabelt carbon fibre backed bucket seats as an option. The engine's specific output of 124 PS (91 kW) per litre was the highest in its segment at that time, while its MultiAir technology allowed for a fuel consumption of 6 litres per 100 kilometres (47 mpg_{‑imp}; 39 mpg_{‑US}) in EU combined driving and CO_{2} emissions of 139 g/km.

From 2014, the MiTo QV became available with the TCT gearbox, which reduced the 0–100 km/h (62 mph) time to 7.3 seconds. With the 2016 facelift, the QV trim level was renamed to the Veloce.

== Engines ==
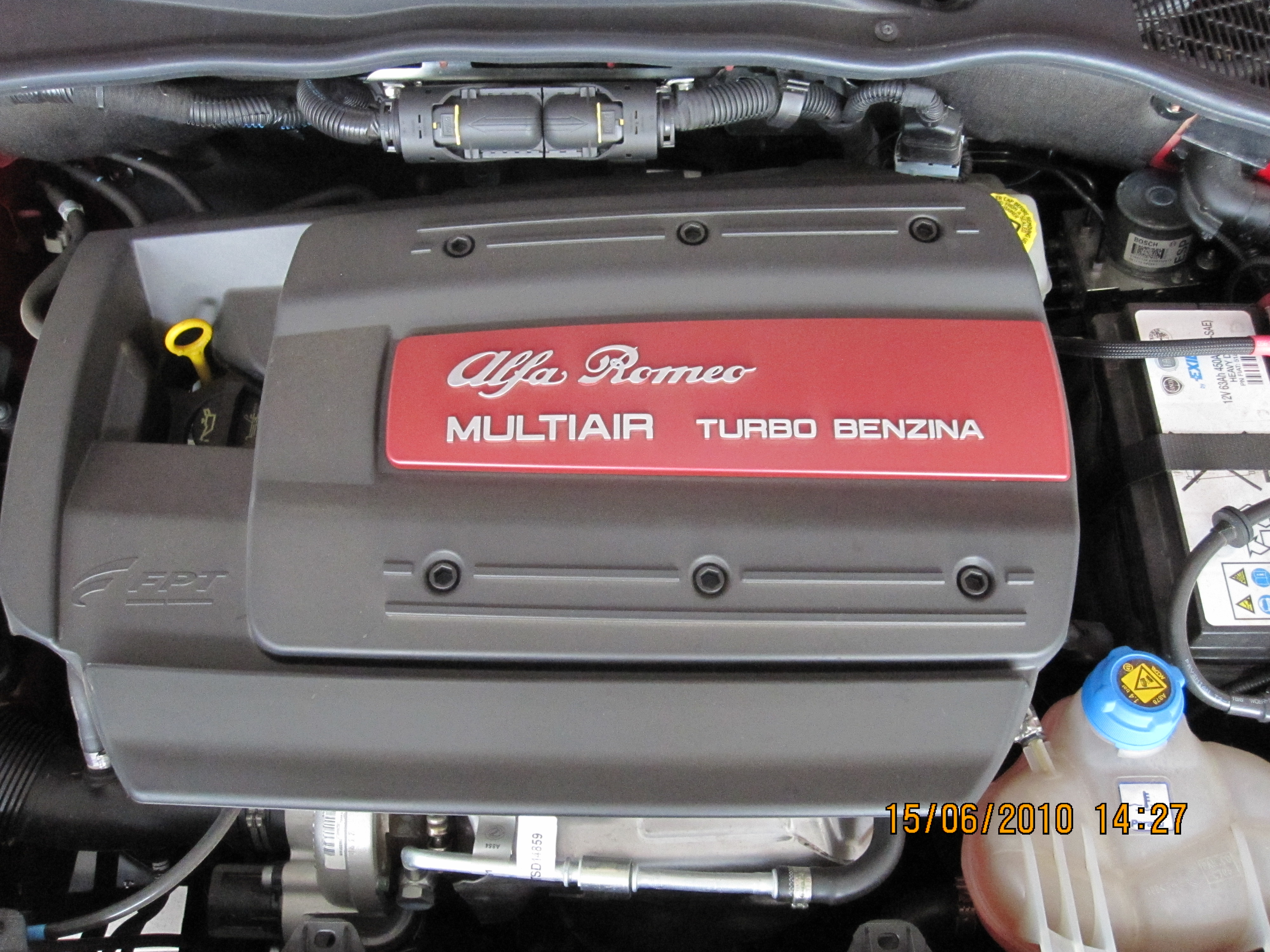
MultiAir Turbo engine used in the MiTo

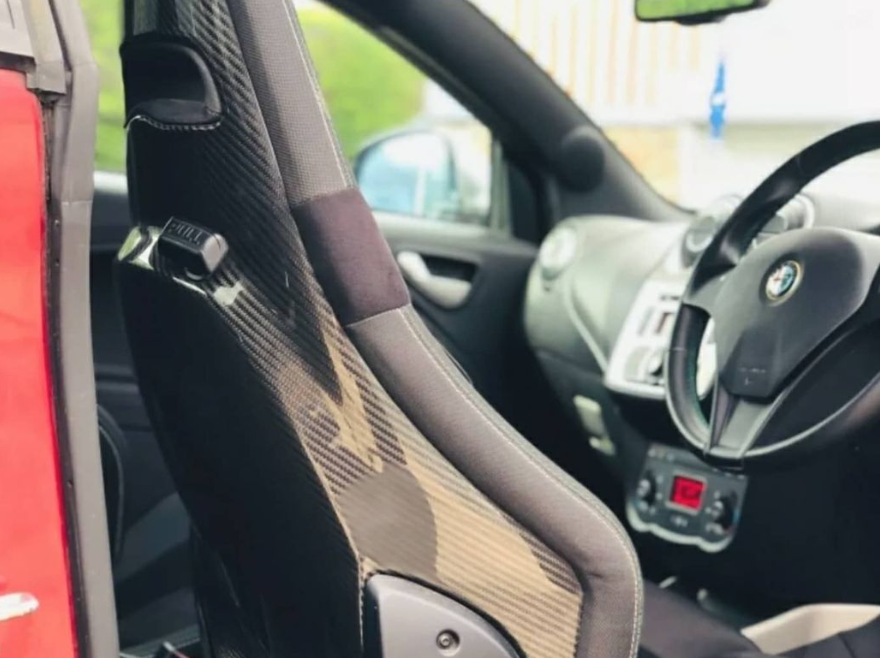
Rear view of the Sabelt carbon fibre-backed bucket seats

At launch, the MiTo featured low-displacement turbocharged petrol and diesel engines, plus a power-limited 79 PS (58 kW; 78 hp) naturally-aspirated engine to meet Italian legislation for novice drivers.

The MiTo received new MultiAir engines from September 2009, with up to a 10% increase in power and up to a 15% increase in torque, as well as a considerable reduction in fuel consumption and CO_{2} emissions (both up to 10%), particulates (up to 40%), and NOx emissions (up to 60%). These new engines were available with 105 PS (77 kW; 104 bhp),135 PS (99 kW; 133 bhp) and 170 PS (125 kW; 168 bhp) power ratings and a start-stop system as standard. From model year 2011, the start-stop system became standard on all models.

In October 2009, a dual-fuel MiTo was unveiled, being able to run on either petrol or LPG with a range of 1,200 kilometres (750 mi). This MiTo was made in collaboration with Landi Renzo.

At the 2011 Frankfurt Motor Show, Alfa Romeo introduced two new engines for the MiTo—the 0.9 L TwinAir engine, and a new low-emission 85 PS (63 kW) version of the 1.3 JTD diesel engine.

=== Specifications ===
Engine	Type	Displacement	Power	Torque	0–100 km/h (0–62 mph)	Top speed	Years
Petrol engines
0.9 TwinAir 85	I2	875 cc (53.4 cu in)	85 PS (63 kW; 84 hp) at 5500 rpm	145 N⋅m (107 lb⋅ft) at 2000 rpm	12.5 s	174 km/h (108 mph)	2011–2012
1.4 MPI	I4	1,368 cc (83.5 cu in)	78 PS (57 kW; 77 hp) at 6000 rpm	120 N⋅m (89 lb⋅ft) at 4750 rpm	12.3	165 km/h (103 mph)	2008–2018
1.4 MPI	I4	1,368 cc (83.5 cu in)	95 PS (70 kW; 94 hp) at 6000 rpm	129 N⋅m (95 lb⋅ft) at 4750 rpm	11.2	180 km/h (110 mph)	2008–2018
0.9 Twinair 105	I2	875 cc (53.4 cu in)	105 PS (77 kW; 104 hp) at 5750 rpm	145 N⋅m (107 lb⋅ft) at 2000 rpm	11.4	184 km/h (114 mph)	2011
1.4 TB	I4	1,368 cc (83.5 cu in)	120 PS (88 kW; 118 hp) at 5000 rpm	206 N⋅m (152 lb⋅ft) at 1750 rpm	8.8	195 km/h (121 mph)	2008–2009
1.4 TB	I4	1,368 cc (83.5 cu in)	155 PS (114 kW; 153 hp) at 5500 rpm	230 N⋅m (170 lb⋅ft) at 3000 rpm	8.0	215 km/h (134 mph)	2009–2018
1.4 MPI (multiair)	I4	1,368 cc (83.5 cu in)	105 PS (77 kW; 104 hp) at 6500 rpm	130 N⋅m (96 lb⋅ft) at 4000 rpm	10.7	187 km/h (116 mph)	2009–2018
1.4 TB (multiair)	I4	1,368 cc (83.5 cu in)	135 PS (99 kW; 133 hp) at 5250 rpm	206 N⋅m (152 lb⋅ft) at 1750 rpm	8.4	207 km/h (129 mph)	2009–2018
1.4 TB (multiair) TCT	I4	1,368 cc (83.5 cu in)	135 PS (99 kW; 133 hp) at 5250 rpm	230 N⋅m (170 lb⋅ft) at 1750 rpm	8.2	207 km/h (129 mph)	2010–2018
1.4 TB (multiair)	I4	1,368 cc (83.5 cu in)	170 PS (125 kW; 168 hp) at 5500 rpm	250 N⋅m (184 lb⋅ft) at 2500 rpm	7.5	219 km/h (136 mph)	2009–
1.4 TB (multiair) TCT	I4	1,368 cc (83.5 cu in)	170 PS (125 kW; 168 hp) at 5500 rpm	250 N⋅m (184 lb⋅ft) at 2500 rpm	7.3	219 km/h (136 mph)	2014–2018
Diesel engines
1.3 JTD	I4	1,248 cc (76.2 cu in)	90 PS (66 kW; 89 hp) at 4000 rpm	200 N⋅m (148 lb⋅ft) at 1750 rpm	11.8	178 km/h (111 mph)	2008–2009
1.3 JTD	I4	1,248 cc (76.2 cu in)	95 PS (70 kW; 94 hp) at 4000 rpm	200 N⋅m (148 lb⋅ft) at 1500 rpm	11.6	180 km/h (112 mph)	2009–2018
1.3 JTD	I4	1,248 cc (76.2 cu in)	85 PS (63 kW; 84 hp) at 3500 rpm	200 N⋅m (148 lb⋅ft) at 1500 rpm	12.9	174 km/h (108 mph)	UK version
1.3 JTD	I4	1,248 cc (76.2 cu in)	85 PS (63 kW; 84 hp) at 3500 rpm	200 N⋅m (148 lb⋅ft) at 1500 rpm	12.9	174 km/h (108 mph)	2011–2018
1.6 JTD	I4	1,598 cc (97.5 cu in)	120 PS (88 kW; 118 hp) at 3750 rpm	320 N⋅m (236 lb⋅ft) at 1750 rpm	9.7	198 km/h (123 mph)	2008–2018
LPG engine
1.4 Turbo GPL	I4	1,368 cc (83.5 cu in)	120 PS (88 kW; 118 hp) at 5000 rpm	206 N⋅m (152 lb⋅ft) at 1750 rpm	8.8	198 km/h (123 mph)	2009–2008

=== Fuel consumption and CO_{2} emissions ===
Engine	Urban	Extra-urban	Combined	CO_{2} emissions
0.9 TwinAir (105 PS)	5.0 L/100 km (56 mpg_{‑imp}; 47 mpg_{‑US})	3.8 L/100 km (74 mpg_{‑imp}; 62 mpg_{‑US})	4.2 L/100 km (67 mpg_{‑imp}; 56 mpg_{‑US})	99 g/km
1.4 MPI (78 PS)	7.7 L/100 km (37 mpg_{‑imp}; 31 mpg_{‑US})	4.8 L/100 km (59 mpg_{‑imp}; 49 mpg_{‑US})	5.9 L/100 km (48 mpg_{‑imp}; 40 mpg_{‑US})	138 g/km
1.4 MPI (78 PS) Start&Stop	7.3 L/100 km (39 mpg_{‑imp}; 32 mpg_{‑US})	4.6 L/100 km (61 mpg_{‑imp}; 51 mpg_{‑US})	5.6 L/100 km (50 mpg_{‑imp}; 42 mpg_{‑US})	130 g/km
1.4 MPI (95 PS)	7.7 L/100 km (37 mpg_{‑imp}; 31 mpg_{‑US})	4.8 L/100 km (59 mpg_{‑imp}; 49 mpg_{‑US})	5.9 L/100 km (48 mpg_{‑imp}; 40 mpg_{‑US})	138 g/km
1.4 TB (120 PS)	8.1 L/100 km (35 mpg_{‑imp}; 29 mpg_{‑US})	5.0 L/100 km (56 mpg_{‑imp}; 47 mpg_{‑US})	6.1 L/100 km (46 mpg_{‑imp}; 39 mpg_{‑US})	145 g/km
1.4 TB (155 PS)	8.5 L/100 km (33 mpg_{‑imp}; 28 mpg_{‑US})	5.3 L/100 km (53 mpg_{‑imp}; 44 mpg_{‑US})	6.5 L/100 km (43 mpg_{‑imp}; 36 mpg_{‑US})	153 g/km
1.4 MPI (105 PS)	7.6 L/100 km (37 mpg_{‑imp}; 31 mpg_{‑US})	4.8 L/100 km (59 mpg_{‑imp}; 49 mpg_{‑US})	5.8 L/100 km (49 mpg_{‑imp}; 41 mpg_{‑US})	136 g/km
1.4 TB (135 PS)	7.4 L/100 km (38 mpg_{‑imp}; 32 mpg_{‑US})	4.5 L/100 km (63 mpg_{‑imp}; 52 mpg_{‑US})	5.6 L/100 km (50 mpg_{‑imp}; 42 mpg_{‑US})	129 g/km
1.4 TB TCT (135 PS)	7.1 L/100 km (40 mpg_{‑imp}; 33 mpg_{‑US})	4.5 L/100 km (63 mpg_{‑imp}; 52 mpg_{‑US})	5.5 L/100 km (51 mpg_{‑imp}; 43 mpg_{‑US})	126 g/km
1.4 TB (170 PS)	8.1 L/100 km (35 mpg_{‑imp}; 29 mpg_{‑US})	4.8 L/100 km (59 mpg_{‑imp}; 49 mpg_{‑US})	6.0 L/100 km (47 mpg_{‑imp}; 39 mpg_{‑US})	139 g/km
1.3 JTD (90 PS)	6.0 L/100 km (47 mpg_{‑imp}; 39 mpg_{‑US})	3.6 L/100 km (78 mpg_{‑imp}; 65 mpg_{‑US})	4.5 L/100 km (63 mpg_{‑imp}; 52 mpg_{‑US})	119 g/km
1.3 JTD (95 PS)	5.5 L/100 km (51 mpg_{‑imp}; 43 mpg_{‑US})	3.6 L/100 km (78 mpg_{‑imp}; 65 mpg_{‑US})	4.3 L/100 km (66 mpg_{‑imp}; 55 mpg_{‑US})	112 g/km
1.3 JTD (95 PS) Start&Stop	5.5 L/100 km (51 mpg_{‑imp}; 43 mpg_{‑US})	3.6 L/100 km (78 mpg_{‑imp}; 65 mpg_{‑US})	4.3 L/100 km (66 mpg_{‑imp}; 55 mpg_{‑US})	104 g/km
1.3 JTD (85 bhp) Start&Stop	4.6 L/100 km (61 mpg_{‑imp}; 51 mpg_{‑US})	3.0 L/100 km (94 mpg_{‑imp}; 78 mpg_{‑US})	3.6 L/100 km (78 mpg_{‑imp}; 65 mpg_{‑US})	95 g/km
1.3 JTD (85 PS) Start&Stop	4.4 L/100 km (64 mpg_{‑imp}; 53 mpg_{‑US})	2.9 L/100 km (97 mpg_{‑imp}; 81 mpg_{‑US})	3.5 L/100 km (81 mpg_{‑imp}; 67 mpg_{‑US})	90 g/km
1.6 JTD	5.9 L/100 km (48 mpg_{‑imp}; 40 mpg_{‑US})	4.1 L/100 km (69 mpg_{‑imp}; 57 mpg_{‑US})	4.8 L/100 km (59 mpg_{‑imp}; 49 mpg_{‑US})	126 g/km
1.6 JTD Start&Stop	5.9 L/100 km (48 mpg_{‑imp}; 40 mpg_{‑US})	4.1 L/100 km (69 mpg_{‑imp}; 57 mpg_{‑US})	4.8 L/100 km (59 mpg_{‑imp}; 49 mpg_{‑US})	114 g/km
1.4 Turbo GPL	10.6 L/100 km (27 mpg_{‑imp}; 22 mpg_{‑US})	6.6 L/100 km (43 mpg_{‑imp}; 36 mpg_{‑US})	8.1 L/100 km (35 mpg_{‑imp}; 29 mpg_{‑US})	131 g/km (petrol mode)
Note: Consumption figures according to European Commission Directive 1999/100/EC.

== Safety ==
The MiTo has seven airbags as standard, and received a 'good' or green result from the first ever Euro NCAP rear impact test (whiplash).

The MiTo received the following ratings:

ANCAP test results Alfa Romeo Mito (2009)
Test	Score
Overall	5 /5 stars
Frontal offset	15.32/16
Side impact	15.78/16
Pole	2/2
Seat belt reminders	3/3
Whiplash protection	Not Assessed
Pedestrian protection	Marginal
Electronic stability control	Standard

Euro NCAP test results LHD, 3-door hatchback (2008)
Test	Score	Rating
Adult occupant:	36	5 /5 stars
Child occupant:	29	3 /5 stars
Pedestrian:	18	2 /4 stars

== Limited and special editions ==
Edizione Sprint (2009): Limited to 250 examples, the Edizione Sprint was available only in Belgium with the 95 PS (70 kW; 94 hp) 1.3 JTDM diesel engine. It bears a special Sprint logo.

Maserati Version (2010): In 2010, Alfa Romeo announced it would produce a limited 100-car series of MiTos to be distributed to Maserati dealerships in Europe. Maserati Version MiTos feature the same 170 PS (130 kW) engine as the Quadrifoglio Verde and exclusive Blu Oceano paint. Aluminium kickplates and a badge on the HVAC controls on the car bear the words "Alfa Romeo for Maserati". The cars are to be used as courtesy cars for Maserati service customers, very much like the "for Ferrari Dealers" versions of the Fiat and Abarth 500.

Quadrifoglio Verde 101 (2012): Based on the QV model, only 101 examples were made to celebrate Alfa Romeo's 101st anniversary. These MiTos featured Rosso Alfa paint, the 170 PS (125 kW; 168 hp) engine, Sabelt racing seats with Alcantara upholstery and backrests made of carbon, exclusive 18-inch alloy wheels, tinted windows, bi-xenon lights, Brembo brakes, and active "Dynamic Suspension".

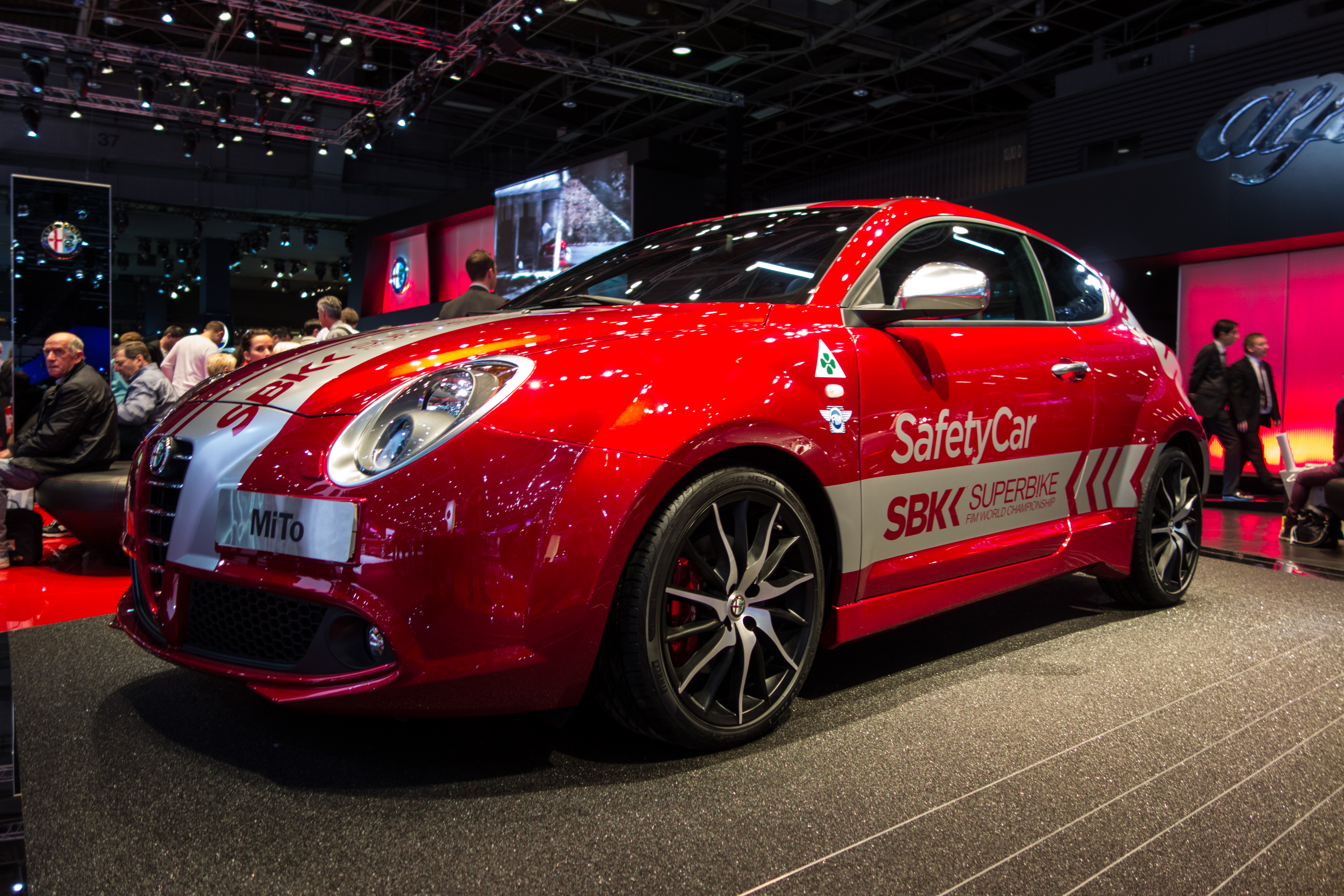
Mito SBK Superbike safety car

MiTo SBK and MiTo Superbike Special Series: At the 2012 Paris Motor Show, Alfa Romeo unveiled a limited run of 200 numbered MiTo SBK cars based on the QV MiTo, along with the MiTo Superbike Special Series model available with all the engines in the range except for the 70 PS (51 kW; 69 hp) and 170 PS (125 kW; 168 hp) 1.4 petrol engines. The MiTo SBK includes 16-inch titanium alloy wheels, a chrome-plated spoiler and exhaust, titanium-coloured mirror fairings, a sporty rear bumper, a black fog light frame, and an "SBK" logo on the rear of the car.

Mito Racer: Introduced at the 2015 Geneva Motor Show, the MiTo Racer sports a checkered flag roof decal, special 17" alloy wheels, a rear sport bumper, a rear spoiler, a chrome exhaust pipe, and a satin-chrome finish for many exterior features. The interior was available with vintage-style grey upholstery with brown eco-leather seats and a black dashboard. The car was available with wide range of engines.

=== MiTo GTA ===
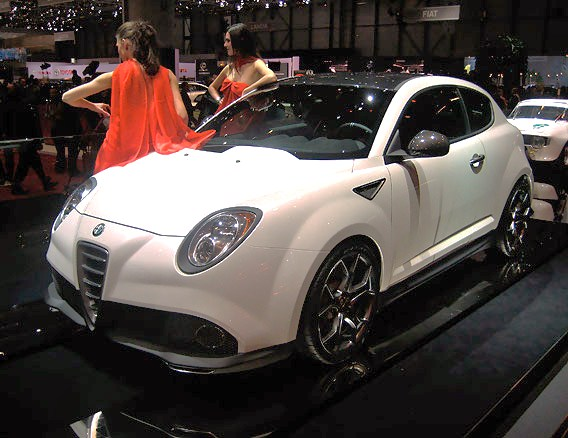
Mito GTA at the 2009 Geneva Motor Show.

The GTA (Gran Turismo Alleggerita), the sportiest version of the MiTo, was unveiled at the March 2009 Geneva Motor Show as a prototype. The concept has a 1.8-litre (Fiat Pratola Serra modular) turbocharged engine with direct fuel injection and variable valve timing for both inlet and exhaust valves, rated at 240 PS (177 kW; 237 hp). The GTA has a top speed of 250 km/h (155 mph) and accelerates from 0 to 100 km/h (62 mph) in 5 seconds. The car's weight has been reduced by the use of carbon fibre for the tailgate spoiler, as well as the roof panel and mirror fairings, plus aluminium for other components. The active suspension has been lowered by 20 millimetres (0.8 in) over the standard MiTo.

=== MiTo FCEV ===
Two Alfa Romeo MiTo Fuel Cell vehicles were used in a hydrogen vehicle test program in Europe. The Alfa Romeo MiTo Fuel Cell car uses a Nuvera fuel cell stack combined with a compact lithium-ion battery pack to supply power to the electric motor. The fuel cell MiTo has a top speed of 150 km/h (93 mph) and can accelerate from 0 to 100 kilometers in 10 seconds, with hydrogen consumption of 3.2 liters diesel equivalent/100 km (74 mpg US) and an NEDC range of 450 kilometers (280 miles) thanks to 700 bar hydrogen tanks.

== Production and sales ==
The MiTo was sold to compete with the Mini Hatch and the newer Audi A1.

In March 2017, Alfa Romeo executive Reid Bigland stated that the MiTo and Giulietta models were going to continue to be produced for the foreseeable future. However the MiTo was discontinued in early 2019.

Year	Production Mirafiori plant	European sales
2008	24,759	13,282
2009	65,342	62,122
2010	53,091	51,994
2011	41,077	40,425
2012	24,857	25,173
2013	19,655	17,884
2014	16,894	16,950
2015	13,909	13,839
2016	14,644	12,944
2017	10,906	11,367
2018	8,274	9,198
Total	293,408	275,178

== Reception ==
What Car? found the MiTo's styling distinctive, but criticised the driving experience and build quality, whilst recommending the turbocharged 1.4-litre petrol engine over the turbocharged 0.9-litre petrol engine, and calling the 1.3-litre diesel engine "adequate". The RAC noted that the facelifted cars were a significant improvement on the pre-facelift cars, and reported "a reliability record that's at the lower end of acceptable" and that "rustproofing is excellent".

=== Awards ===
- 2013 "Bestes Auto des Jahres 2013" – Import small cars category – Auto, Motor und Sport
- 2011 Die besten autos 2011 – Import small cars category – Auto, Motor und Sport; What Car? Reader Awards – Supermini category winner; "My favorite cars" Small cars category Quattroruote; Die besten autos 2010 – Import small cars category – Auto, Motor und Sport
