= MultiAir =

Automobile variable valve timing technology

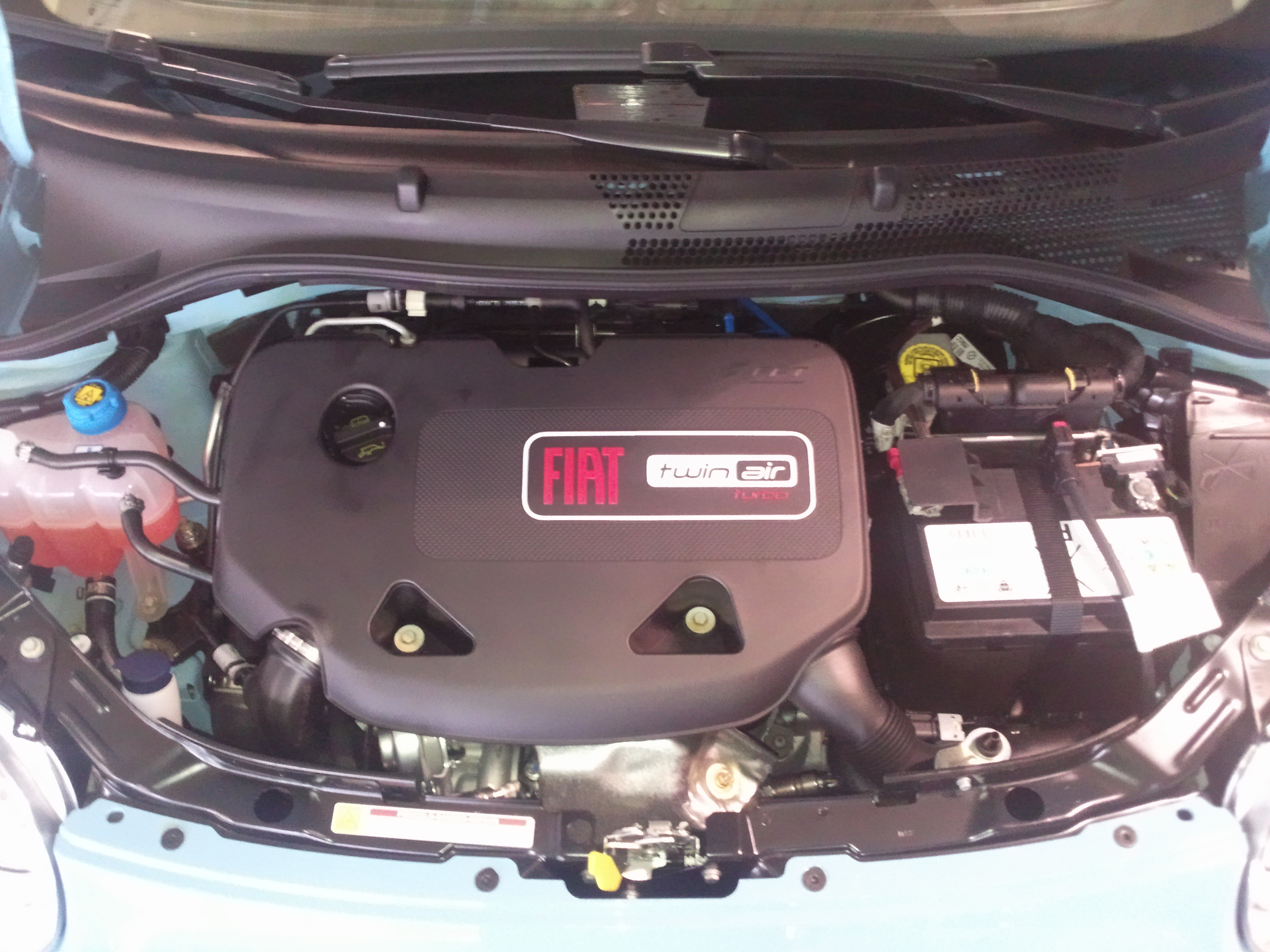
Fiat 875 cc two cylinder TwinAir engine featuring Multiair technology

MultiAir or Multiair is a hydraulically actuated variable valve timing (VVT) and variable valve lift (VVL) engine technology enabling "cylinder by cylinder, stroke by stroke" control of intake air directly via a gasoline engine's inlet valves. Developed by Alfa Romeo S.p.A. and Fiat Powertrain Technologies, the technology addresses a primary engine inefficiency: pumping losses caused by restricting intake passage by the throttle plate that regulates air feeding the cylinders.

Fiat S.p.A. and Alfa Romeo S.p.A., now known as Stellantis, launched MultiAir in 2009, employing a proprietary electro-hydraulic system to precisely control air intake without a throttle valve to increase engine power and torque, reduce fuel consumption, reduce emissions, and improve engine operation, offering "a more controllable flow of air during the combustion cycle in comparison with mechanical VVT systems." The technology allows engines to be lighter and smaller while reducing pump losses. It can be adapted to existing engines by replacing the camshaft with the MultiAir system, thus requiring a new head only.

MultiAir was licensed to the Schaeffler Group in 2011, which also markets the system as Uniair. Schaeffler began supplying Uniair systems in 2017 to Jaguar Land Rover, branded as Ingenium technology.

Compatible with both naturally aspirated and forced-induction engines, MultiAir technology was patented by Fiat in 2002 and was launched at the 2009 Geneva Motor Show in the Alfa Romeo MiTo. 1.4 L MultiAir engines for global markets are manufactured in Termoli, Italy at the Fiat Powertrain Technologies factory and the FCA's Dundee Engine Plant (formerly of Global Engine Alliance's GEMA manufacturing branch), with critical systems manufactured and assembled by Schaeffler Group.

In 2010, the 1.4 L MultiAir engine won the International Engine of the Year as well as Popular Science's Best of What's New. In the same year, the Fiat SGE engine (0.9 L turbocharged and 1.0 L naturally aspirated TwinAir units), also using MultiAir technology, was launched in the Fiat 500. It is produced in Bielsko-Biała, Poland. It was named Best New Engine in 2011.

Both FIRE and SGE units are equipped with MultiAir and use indirect fuel injection.

The GME (Hurricane) and GSE (FireFly) MultiAir II engines, which use direct fuel injection, were first made available in 2016.

== Technology ==
How it works
"The MultiAir system is elegantly simple. An electrohydraulic actuator, a high-response, electronically activated solenoid—controls the pressure applied to hydraulic fluid (engine oil drawn from the sump) that fills a thin passageway that connects the intake valves and the camshaft. The solenoid valve regulates the amount of oil pumped by the cam action to either the valve or a bypass reservoir.

When pressurized, the hydraulic line behaves like a solid body and transmits the lift schedule imparted by the intake cam directly to the intake valve. When the solenoid is disengaged, a spring takes over valve actuation duties.

This electrohydraulic link allows independent operation of the two components, which enables near real-time control over the valve lift profiles, said Bernard. Whereas a closed solenoid normally transmits the pressure generated by the camshaft’s intake profile to the valve, an open solenoid breaks the hydraulic link between cam and valve, decoupling their operations."
Society of Automotive Engineering, 2010

For variable valve lift, competing technologies (e.g., Honda's VTEC and BMW's Valvetronic) use electromechanical concepts, achieving valve lift variation via dedicated mechanisms; it can also be combined with camshaft phasers to allow control of both valve lift and phase. In contrast, MultiAir uses managed hydraulic fluid to provide variable valve control.

Control of a MultiAir engine's intake valves works via a valve tappet (cam follower), moved by a mechanical intake cam, which is connected to the intake valve through a hydraulic chamber, controlled by a normally open on/off solenoid valve. The system allows optimum timing of intake valve operation.

MultiAir technology can increase power (up to 10%) and torque (up to 15%), as well as reduce consumption levels (up to 10%) and emissions of CO_{2} (up to 10%), particulates (up to 40%) and NOx (up to 60%) when compared to a traditional petrol engine. The system also provides smoother cold weather operation, greater torque delivery, and no engine shake at shut-off.

== Development ==
Research on critical related technologies started in the 1980s when engine electronic control reached market maturity. MultiAir was developed over ten years at Fiat's Centro Ricerche Fiat (CRF) in Orbassano outside Turin, after a five-year delay during Fiat's 2000-2005 partnership with General Motors. The vice president of Fiat Powertrain Research & Development, Rinaldo Rinolfi, led the team who developed the technology at a cost of over $100 million.

== Other systems ==
More advanced, fully camless valvetrain systems are under development but are not yet production-ready. The Valvetronic system used by BMW allows the valve timing and lift to be varied, but not the cam profile. The ability to vary the latter is characteristic of camless and the MultiAir systems.

== Applications ==
- Fiat FIRE engine
- Fiat SGE (TwinAir) engine
- Fiat GSE (FireFly) engine
- Fiat GME (Hurricane) engine
- Chrysler Tigershark engine

== See also ==
- Camless
- Variable valve timing
