= Fiat TwinAir engine =

TwinAir engine
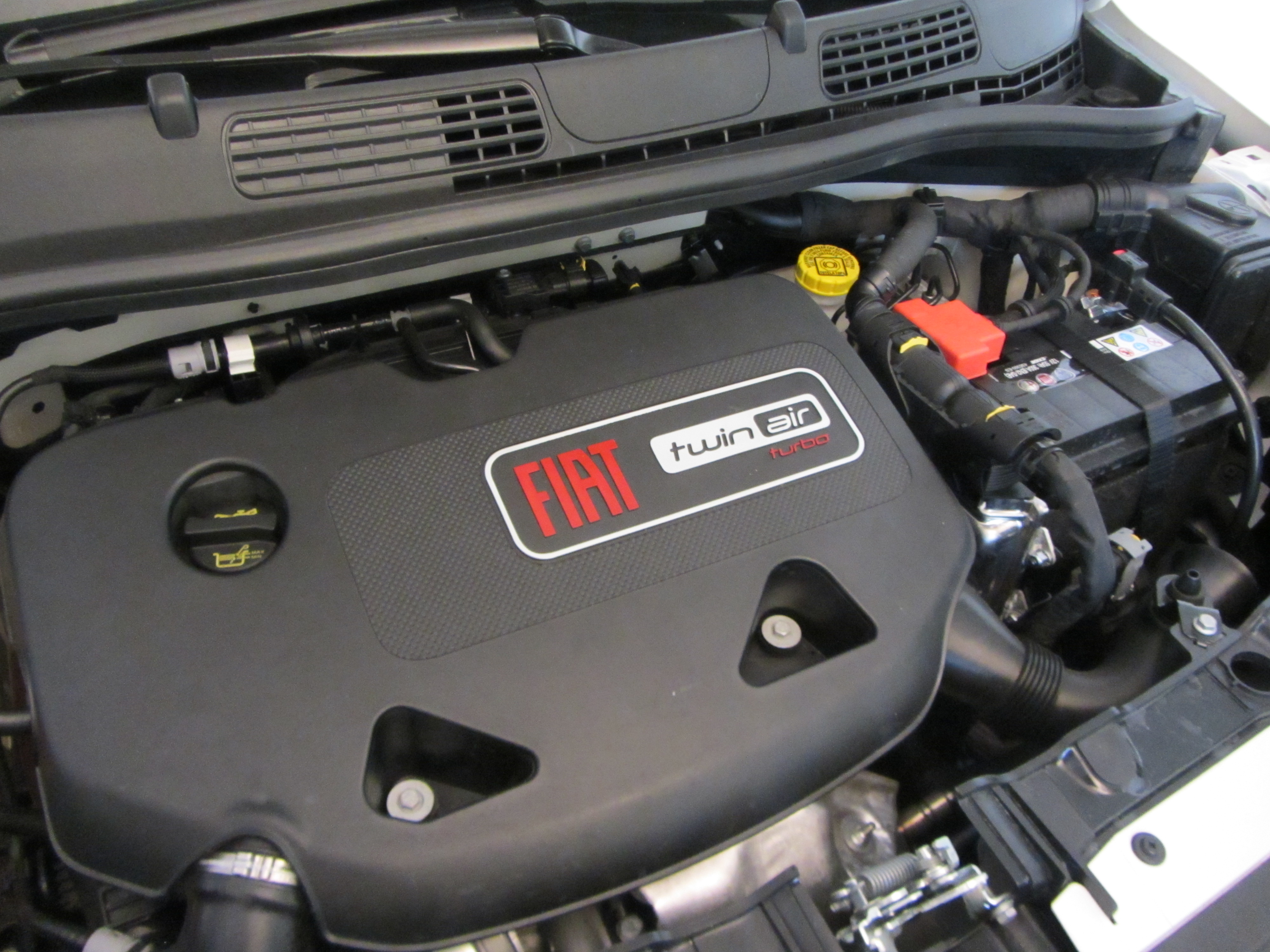

Overview
- Manufacturer: Fiat Powertrain Technologies (2010-2011); Fiat Group Automobiles (2011-2014); FCA Italy (2014-)
- Also called: SGE (Small Gasoline Engine)
- Production: 2010–present

Layout
- Configuration: Straight-two
- Displacement: 1.0 L (964 cc) (naturally aspirated); 0.9 L (875 cc) (turbocharged)
- Cylinder bore: 83.5 mm (3.29 in) (naturally aspirated); 80.5 mm (3.17 in) (turbocharged)
- Piston stroke: 88 mm (3.5 in) (naturally aspirated); 86 mm (3.4 in) (turbocharged)
- Cylinder block material: Cast iron
- Cylinder head material: Aluminium
- Valvetrain: 8-valve, chain-driven SOHC, MultiAir
- Compression ratio: 11.2:1 (naturally aspirated); 10.0:1 (turbocharged)

Combustion
- Turbocharger: Single (in some versions)
- Fuel system: Indirect injection
- Fuel type: Gasoline/CNG, bifuel
- Oil system: Wet sump
- Cooling system: Water-cooled

Output
- Power output: 60 PS (44 kW) (naturally aspirated); 80 PS (59 kW) (bifuel turbo); 85 PS (63 kW) or 105 PS (77 kW) (turbo)
- Specific power: 62 PS/L (TwinAir 60); 97 PS/L (TwinAir 85); 120 PS/L (TwinAir 105)
- Torque output: 88 N⋅m (65 lb⋅ft) at 3,500 rpm (naturally aspirated); 140 N⋅m (103 lb⋅ft) at 2,500 rpm (bifuel turbo); 145 N⋅m (107 lb⋅ft) at 2,000 rpm (turbo)

Chronology
- Predecessor: FIRE engine
- Successor: Fiat Global Small Engine

Fiat's TwinAir engine is a Straight-twin engine designed by Fiat Powertrain Technologies as part of its Small Gasoline Engine (SGE) family — employing Fiat’s MultiAir hydraulically actuated variable valve timing and lift technology.

Offered in a variety of FCA vehicles in turbocharged and naturally aspirated variants, the engine is noted for its reduced size, weight, fuel consumption and CO_{2} emissions.

In the 2011 International Engine of the Year awards, the 875 cc (53.4 cu in) TwinAir won Best Engine Under 1 Litre, Best New Engine, Best Green Engine and International Engine of the Year. Dean Slavnich, editor of Engine Technology International and co-chairman of the International Engine of the Year Awards, called the TwinAir one of the "all-time great engines.”

== Development and launch ==
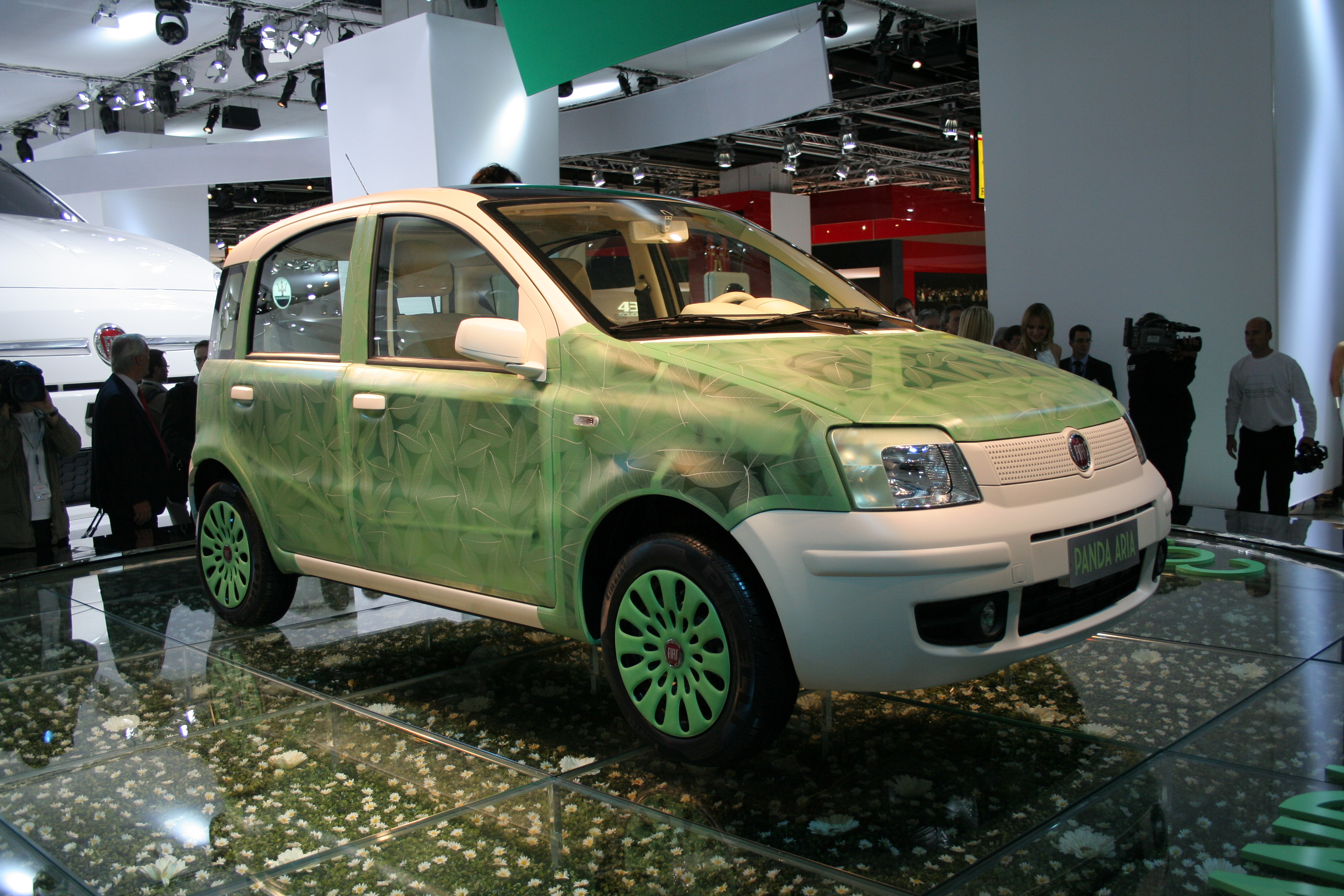
Fiat Panda Aria at IAA 2007

Fiat's TwinAir debuted at Internationale Automobil-Ausstellung 2007 in the Fiat Panda Aria concept car. as an 80 PS (59 kW), turbocharged, CNG-hydrogen mix and gasoline bifuel unit.

The production TwinAir engine was launched at the 2010 Geneva Motor Show in 85 PS (63 kW), turbocharged gasoline form and became available later in 2010 in the Fiat 500.

Later, it was launched also in other FCA vehicles such as the 2012 Punto. The naturally aspirated 1.0 L 60 PS (44 kW) version became available on the 2012 Fiat Panda and the 500 in select markets, and so two other turbocharged 0.9 L variants: the 80 PS bi-fuel CNG/petrol unit (on Panda, 500L and Ypsilon) and the 105 PS unit (on MiTo, Punto, 500L and 500).

== Applications ==
=== Alfa Romeo ===
- Alfa Romeo MiTo

=== Chrysler ===
- Chrysler 200C EV (Concept)

=== Fiat ===
- Fiat 500
- Fiat Panda
- Fiat Punto
- Fiat 500L

=== Lancia ===
- Lancia Ypsilon

== Awards ==
- Technobest 2010
- Die Besten Autos 2011:
  - Paul Pietsch Prize
- International Engine of the Year 2011:
  - International Engine of the Year
  - Sub 1-litre class
  - Best New Engine
  - Best Green Engine
- International Engine of the Year 2013:
  - Best Green Engine (TwinAir CNG bifuel)
