= BMW S85 =

BMW S85B50 engine
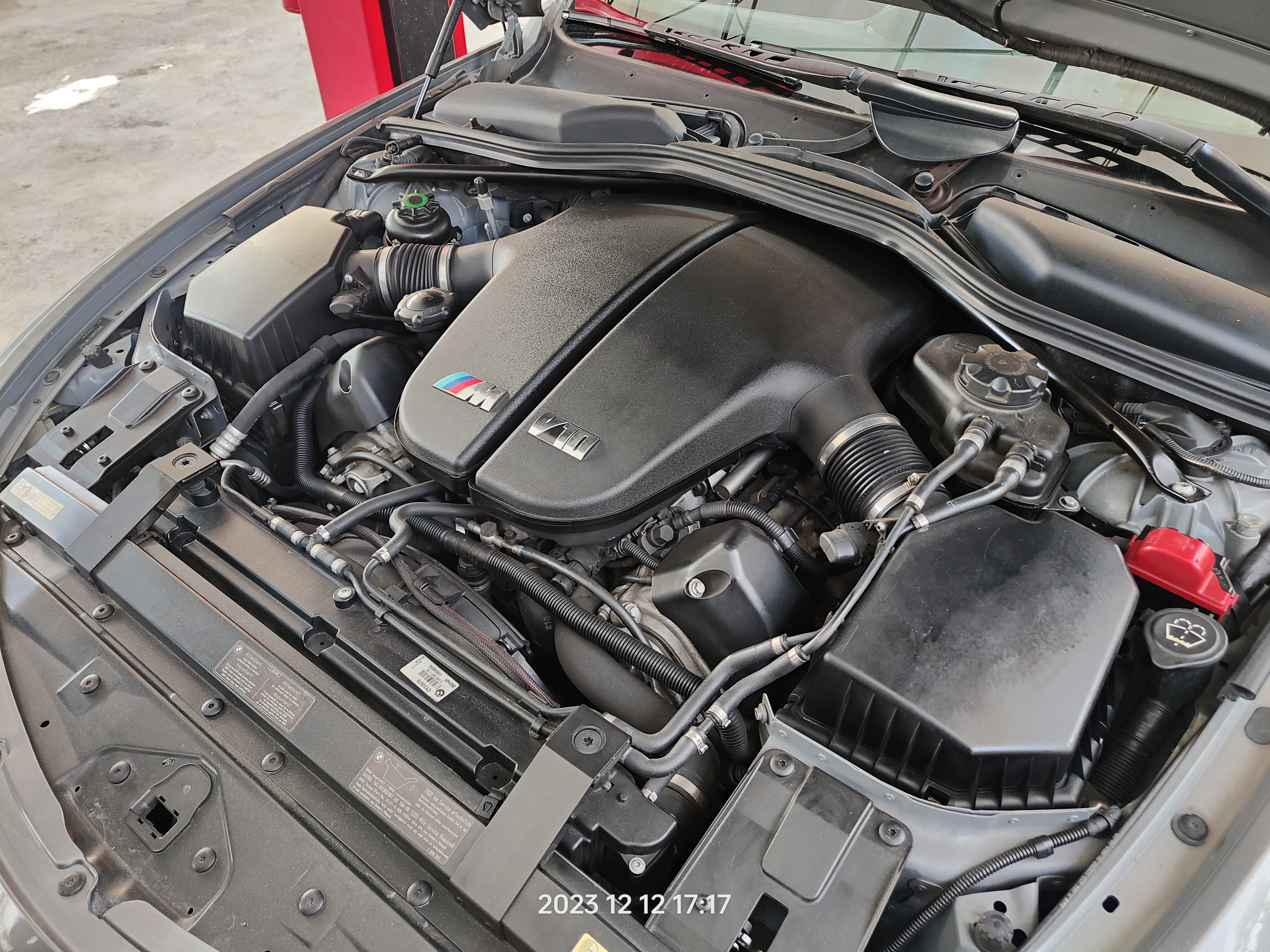
- S85B50 in an E63 M6

Overview
- Manufacturer: (Germany) BMW
- Production: 2005–2010

Layout
- Configuration: 90° V10
- Displacement: 5.0 L (4,999 cc)
- Cylinder bore: 92 mm (3.62 in)
- Piston stroke: 75.2 mm (2.96 in)
- Cylinder block material: Aluminium
- Cylinder head material: Aluminium
- Valvetrain: DOHC w/ VVT

Combustion
- Fuel type: Petrol

Output
- Power output: 378 kW (507 hp)
- Torque output: 520 N⋅m (384 lb⋅ft)

Chronology
- Predecessor: BMW S62
- Successor: BMW S63

The BMW S85B50 is a naturally aspirated V10 petrol engine which replaced the BMW S62 V8 engine in the M5 model and was produced from 2005–2010. It was both BMW's first and only production V10 engine, and the first petrol V10 engine to be available in a production wagon (estate).

Introduced in the E60 M5, the S85B50 was inspired by BMW's previous Formula One involvement. Unlike most other BMW M engines, the S85 is not related to a regular, non-M production BMW engine.

The BMW S65 V8 engine (used in the E92 M3) is based on the S85.

== Nomenclature ==
As the S85 was BMW's first V10 engine, it was given a new series in the BMW's engine codes. The "60s" were used for V8 engines and the "70s" were used for V12 engines, therefore the V10 was allocated in the "80s" (despite having fewer cylinders than the V12 engines in the "70s".)

The engine code for the related BMW S65 V8 engine reflects its link to the S85. The S65 code was selected to signify that the V8 is largely derived from the S85 minus two cylinders, and not related to BMW's other V8s.

== Design ==
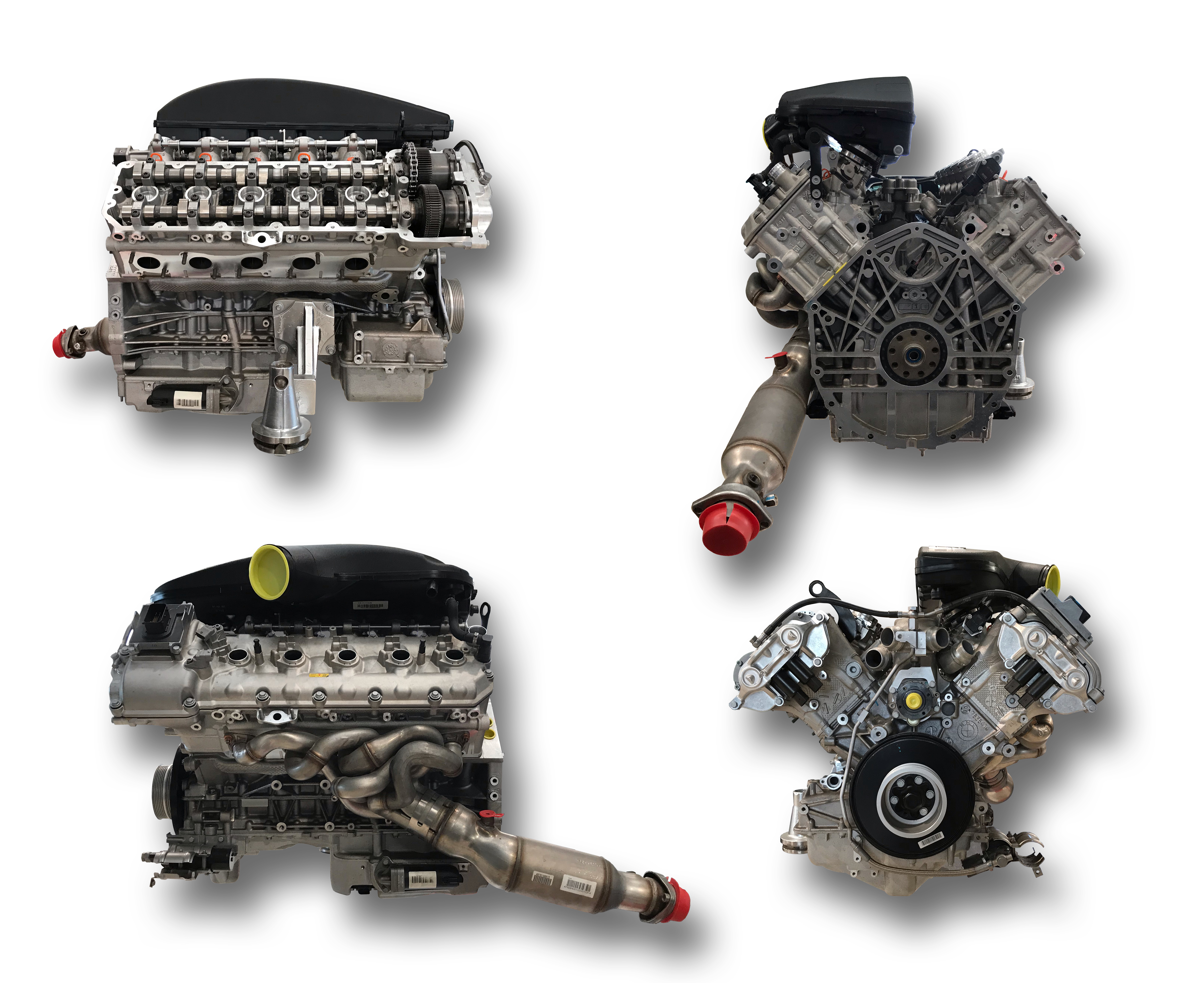
Compilation of the four side views of the BMW V10 engine as it is installed in the BMW M5 and M6

Version	Year	Displacement	Power	Torque
S85B50	2005–2010	4,999 cc (305.1 cu in)	373 kW (507 PS; 500 hp) at 7,750 rpm	520 N⋅m (384 lb⋅ft) at 6,100 rpm

The S85 has dual overhead camshafts with four valves per cylinder and double-VANOS (variable valve timing). The engine block and cylinder head are constructed from aluminum alloy.

Peak power is 373 kW (507 PS; 500 hp) at 7,750 rpm and peak torque is 520 N⋅m (384 lb⋅ft) at 6,100 rpm. The redline is 8,250 rpm, and the specific output of 74.6 kW (100.0 bhp) per litre is amongst the highest of naturally aspirated production car engines.

Features include:

- Displacement of 4,999 cc (305.1 cu in)
- Compression ratio of 12.0:1
- Bore of 92 mm (3.62 in) and stroke of 75.2 mm (2.96 in)
- 10 electronically actuated individual throttle bodies
- Cast aluminum block with bed plate design split at the crankshaft axis
- Valves actuated through non-rotating inverted bucket cam followers
- Oil-cooled, cast aluminium pistons
- Forged steel crankshaft with counterweights, shared crankpins producing an uneven firing interval of 90 or 54 degrees
- Siemens MS S65 engine control unit
- Application of an "ionic current measuring system" for knock sensing. The ionic current system uses a low voltage applied across the spark plugs immediately following the ignition spark, and can detect misfires as well as knock.
- Quasi-dry sump lubricating system where the engine has 2 oil sumps that hold oil, and oil pickup is enhanced by secondary electrical scavenge pumps that feed oil from the smaller sump to the main sump
- Uneven Firing order of 1-6-5-10-2-7-3-8-4-9
- Mass of 240 kg (529 lb)

== Reliability ==
A well-known problem with the S85 is premature rod bearing wear, which can occur around 80,000 km or roughly 50,000 miles. The root cause is attributed to the engine’s high-revving nature, tight tolerances and a lack of clearance between the rod bearings and the rod journals. The S85 operates at very high RPMs (up to 8,250 RPM), and the lack of sufficient lubrication combined with high pressures leads to increased wear on the bearings, potentially resulting in catastrophic engine failure if not replaced preemptively. The original maintenance intervals for oil changes were too long for these conditions, exacerbating the issue. Hence, replacement of rod bearings preemptively as part of preventive maintenance and shortening oil change intervals are paramount to engine longevity.

Another common issue involves the VANOS system, which controls the variable valve timing. The VANOS solenoids and high-pressure oil lines can degrade over time, leading to erratic performance or engine fault codes. The complexity of the system, combined with high oil temperatures, can cause these components to fail prematurely.

Throttle actuator failures are also a known problem. These actuators control the throttle response in the S85’s individual throttle bodies. Over time, the gears within the actuators wear down, leading to a loss of throttle control or limp mode. This issue is particularly problematic due to the engine’s dependence on precise throttle control for its high-performance output.

== Awards ==
The S85 has won the following awards at the International Engine of the Year:

- 2005 International Engine of the Year, Best Performance Engine, Best Above 4.0 Litre, Best New Engine
- 2006 International Engine of the Year, Best Performance Engine, Best Above 4.0 Litre
- 2007 Best Performance Engine, Best Above 4.0 Litre
- 2008 Best Above 4.0 Litre

== Applications ==
- 2005–2010 E60/E61 M5
- 2005–2010 E63/E64 M6
- 2009–2010 Wiesmann GT MF5 (and also 2011 Wiesmann Roadster MF5 V10 daHLer Schwaben Folia Black Bat; V10 engine was upgraded to 600 hp)
- 2005–2007 Fisker Latigo CS V10 (One prototype and one production car, upgraded from 507 to 650 hp)
- 2009–2013 Vermot Veritas RS III (30 cars were built, and used a 600-hp version of the S85 engine)
