= Landi Renzo =

Landi Renzo S.p.A
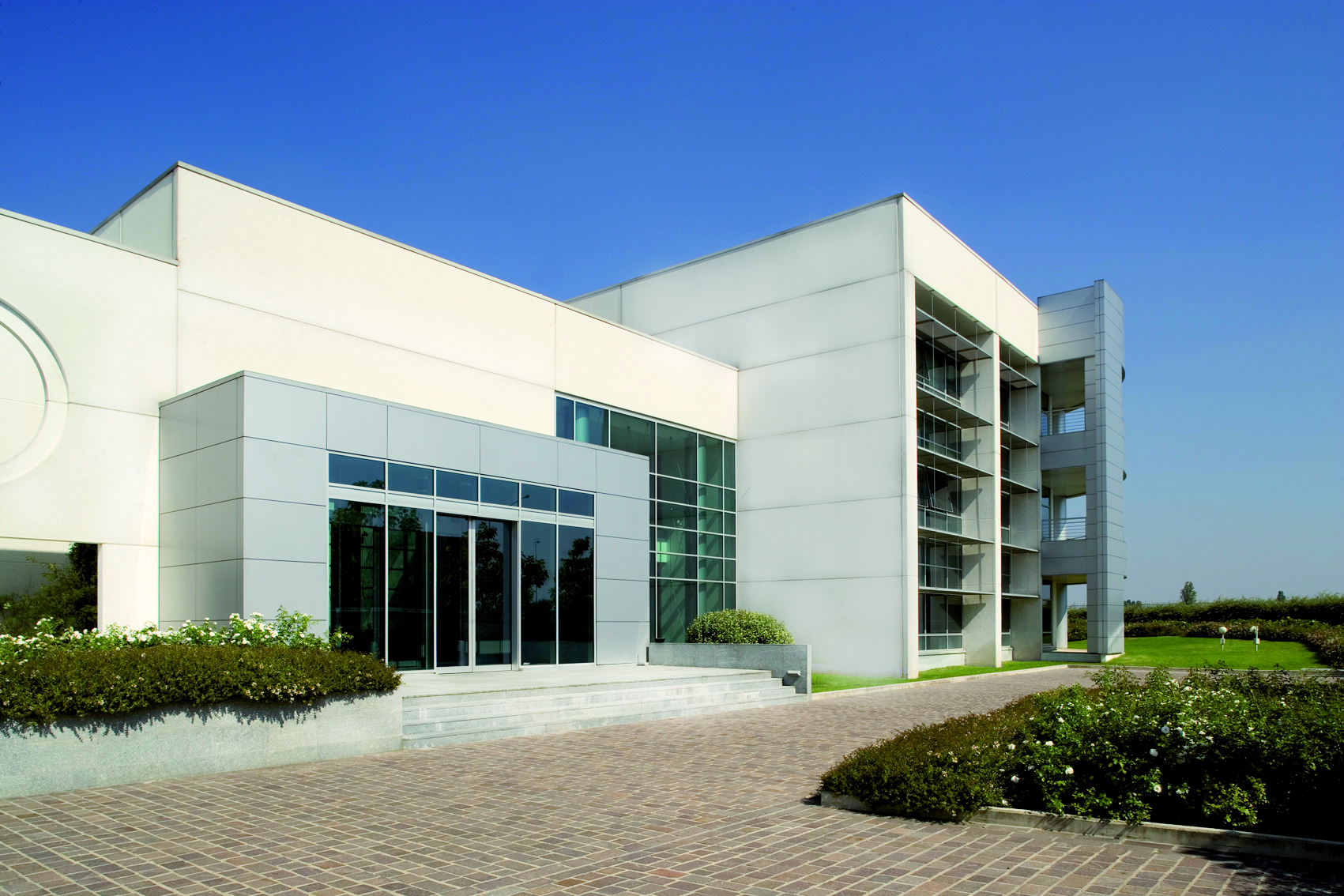
- Landi Renzo S.p.A. headquarters
- Company type: Public
- Industry: Automotive
- Founded: 1954
- Headquarters: Cavriago, Reggio Emilia, Italy
- Key people: Stefano Landi (President); Annalisa Stupenengo (CEO)
- Products: Pressure management solutions for both the mobility and infrastructure sectors
- Number of employees: 951 (2022)
- Website: https://landirenzogroup.com

Landi Renzo S.p.A (also called just Landi) is a multinational company headquartered in Cavriago, Province of Reggio Emilia, Italy. Landi produces pressure management components for natural gas and hydrogen. The Group operates in the sustainable mobility and infrastructure sectors. In mobility, it serves OEMs (passenger cars to heavy-duty vehicles and machinery) and the aftermarket (retailers and importers). In infrastructure, it provides private and industrial solutions and project management for global energy companies. Listed on Euronext Star Milan since 2007, it generates over 300 million euros in revenue.

== History ==
The company was established in 1954 when Renzo Landi and his wife Giovannina Domenichini founded Officine Meccaniche Renzo Landi in Reggio Emilia, the only manufacturer of mixers designed for all kinds of vehicles. Between 1963 and 1964 the company began exporting to Japan, France, Belgium, and The Netherlands.

Renzo Landi died in 1977. The company continued under the management of his wife and son, Stefano. In 1987, Stefano became managing director, when the company became a Joint Stock Company, officially launching Landi Renzo S.p.A.

In 1993, Landi Renzo transitioned into an industrial group. It acquired Landi Srl, a related company, and Eurogas Holding B.V., a Dutch company operating in the same sector. In 1999, the group established a Polish branch, Landi Renzo Polska S.p.Z.o.o. In 2000, the company took over Med S.p.A. in Reggio Emilia.

In 2001, 70% of Eurogas Holding B.V. was sold, and Eurogas Utrecht B.V. was purchased by the company's subsidiary, Landi International B.V.

In 2003, a Brazilian branch was opened, followed by a branch in China in 2005 and in Pakistan the next year. In 2006, the LANDIRENZO Corporate University was established as a center for ideas and human resource development within the Landi Group.

In 2007, Landi Renzo became listed on the Italian stock exchange's STAR segment of Piazza Affari and expanded to Tehran (Iran). In 2008, the company acquired Lovato Gas SpA, the world's third-largest operator with 10% of the market

In September 2009 the company opened another international branch, Landi Renzo RO, in Bucharest, Romania.

In 2010, the company acquired the Italian manufacturer A.E.B. srl and the American Baytech Corp., alongside the opening of subsidiaries in Romania, Venezuela, Argentina, India and the United States.

In 2012 the Group acquired SAFE & CEC. Over these last 40 years, it has played a leading role in innovating the gas value chain through integrated solutions and products.

In 2017 Landi Renzo Group signed an agreement with US company Clean Energy Fuels, creating a partnership destined to become a world leader in the compressor business with operational headquarters in Italy.

In 2019 the brand Landi Renzo signs an exclusive partnership with Uber in Brazil to offer partners conversion to natural gas - the two international players side by side in reducing pollution.

In 2021 Landi Renzo Group announces the agreement between Landi Renzo and Italy Technology Group for the acquisition of Metatron, a leading company at international level in the sector of natural gas and hydrogen components for the Mid&Heavy Duty segment.

In 2022 The Group strengthens its presence in the gas and hydrogen infrastructure industry through its subsidiary SAFE&CEC’s acquisition of Idro Meccanica, a leader in the field of compressors for hydrogen and biomethane distribution. In the same year, Itaca Equity Holding S.p.A joins the company with a minority investment in the share capital of the Group, as a long-term investor, aiming to support the Landi Renzo Group’s expansion in both the mobility and infrastructure sectors. The main shareholder of Itaca Equity Holding S.p.A. is TIP - Tamburi Investment Partners.

In 2024 the launch of the mechatronic pressure regulator EM-H. this new product is a key solution for next-generation systems that enable zero CO_{2} emissions for hydrogen-fueled internal combustion engines.

== Management ==
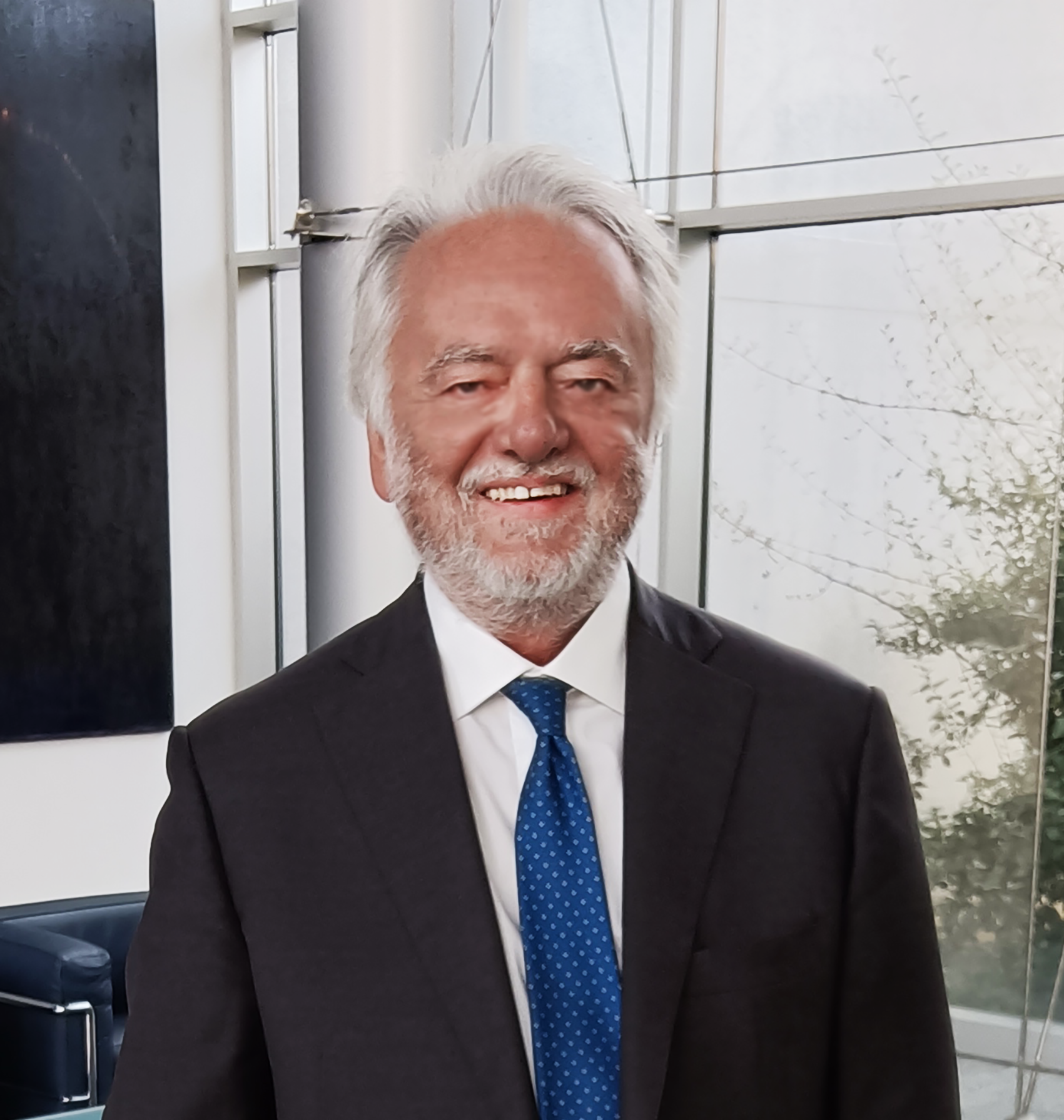
Stefano Landi, President of Landi Renzo Group

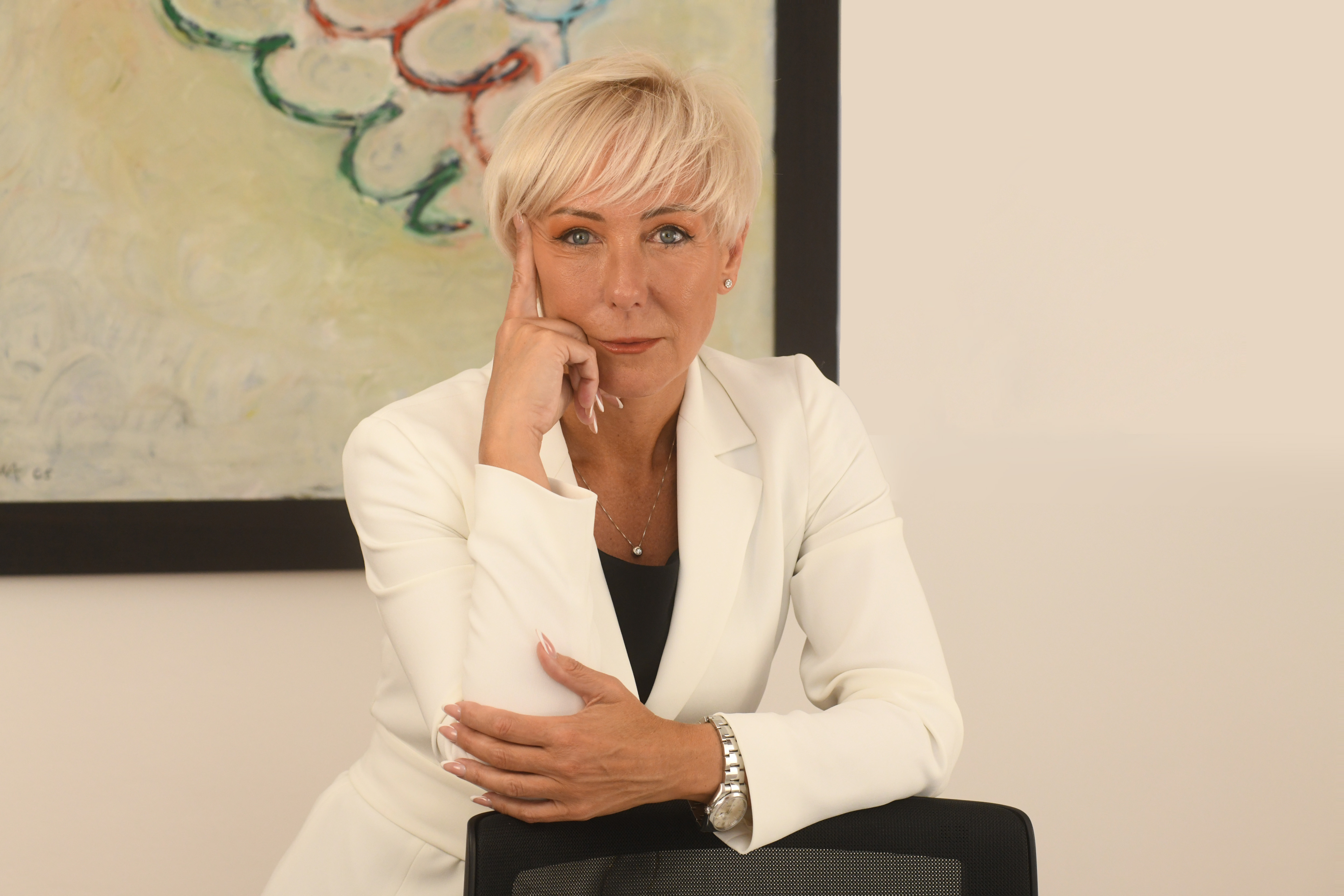
Annalisa Stupenengo, CEO and General Manager of Landi Renzo Group
