= Fiat Abarth 1000SP =

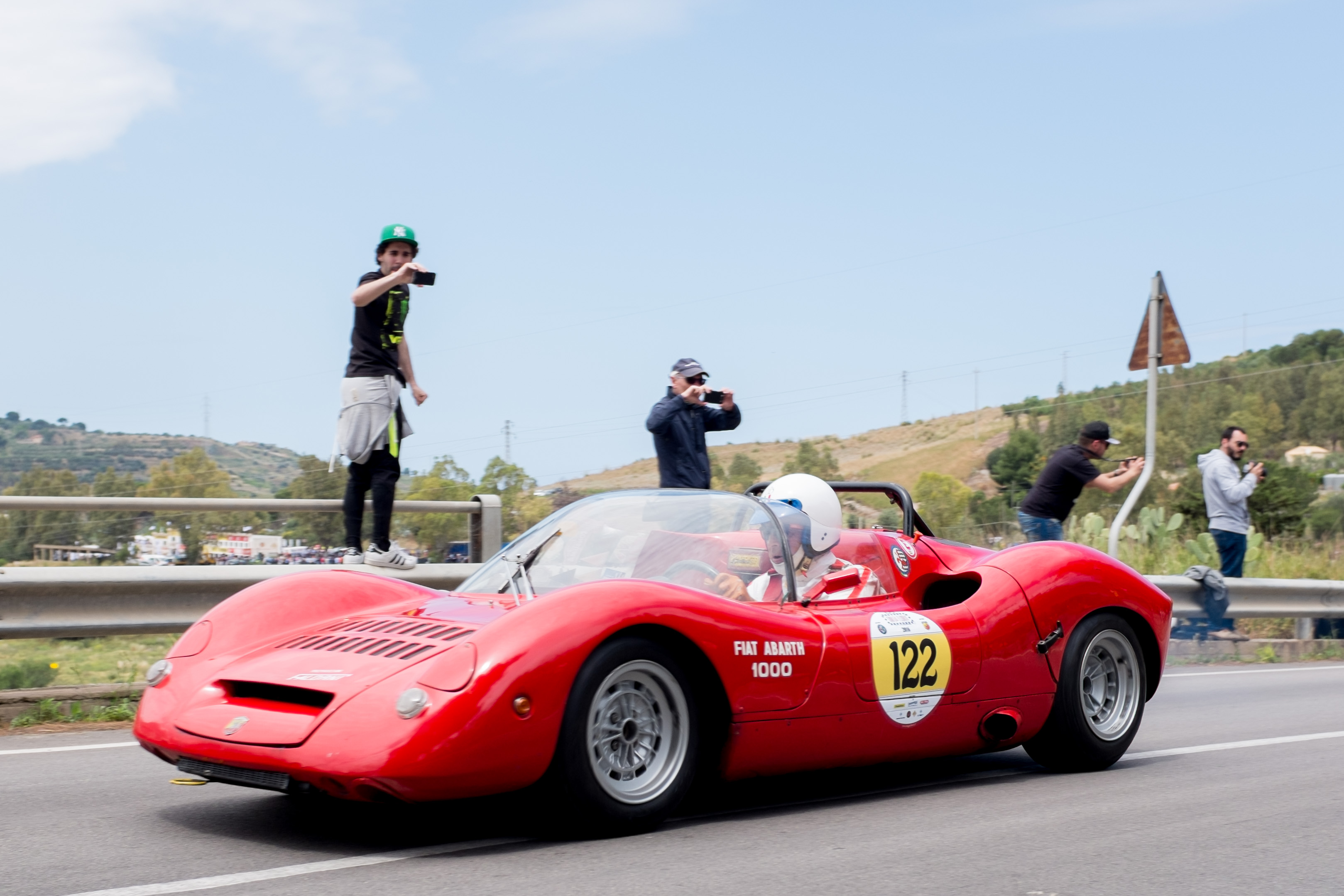

Overview
- Manufacturer: Abarth
- Production: 1966–1970
- Designer: Mario Colucci

Body and chassis
- Class: Group 4 sports car Group 6 prototype sports car
- Layout: RMR
- Related: Fiat 600

Powertrain
- Engine: 984 cc I4
- Transmission: 5-speed manual

Dimensions
- Wheelbase: 2,200 mm (86.6 in)
- Length: 3,445 mm (135.6 in)
- Width: 1,605 mm (63.2 in)
- Height: 930 mm (36.6 in)
- Curb weight: 480 kg (1,058 lb)

Chronology
- Successor: Abarth Classiche 1000 SP (spiritual)

The Fiat Abarth 1000SP (Sport Prototype) is a Group 4 and Group 6 sports racing car built by Abarth in 1966 and 1970.

== Development ==
The car was built by engineer Mario Colucci, and based on the mechanics of the Fiat 600 extensively modified, to participate in the races reserved for Group 6 sports cars. For this reason, 50 road specimens were built to obtain homologation for racing.

== Overview ==
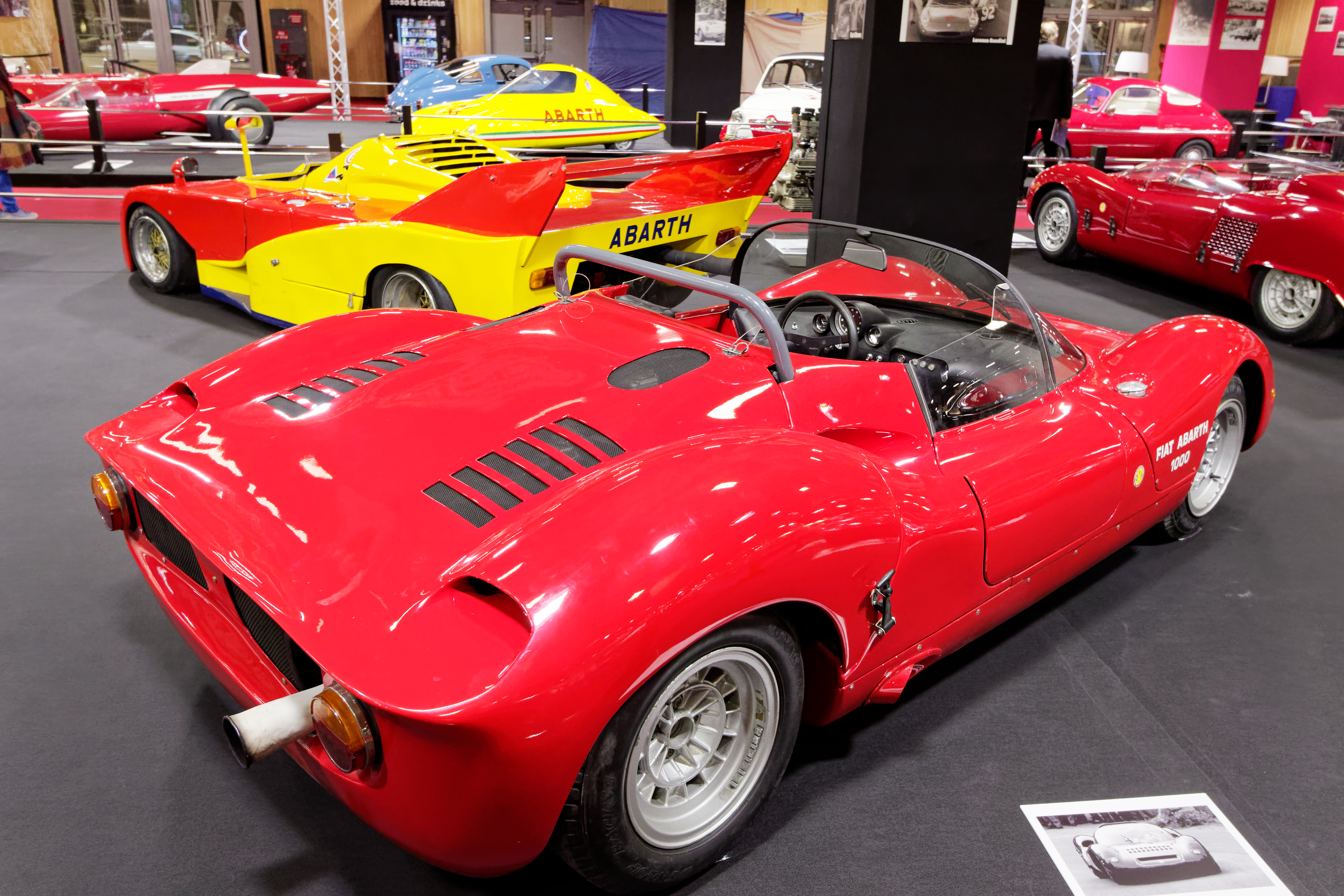
Rear view

The car uses a tubular steel frame chassis and a DOHC inline 4-cylinder engine; making 105 HP with a twin-shaft cylinder head, placed in a central position capable of pushing the car up to a maximum speed of 230 km/h (140 mph). This engine was equipped with two Weber 40 DCOE carburetors, while the lubrication was a wet-sump with a separate oil filter. The gearbox was a five-speed manual. The front of the vehicle was particularly sharp to allow a good flow of air through two openings that led to the engine coolant radiators. The suspensions in the front section were equipped with superimposed wishbones, stabilizer bars, coil springs, and telescopic shock absorbers, while in the rear section there were tubular oscillating arms, stabilizer bars, and coil springs, and telescopic shock absorbers. The bodywork was made of plastic to lighten the overall weight.

== Racing history ==
The first race of the 1000SP was the Coppa dell Collina di Pistoia in 1966, where it finished fifth driven by Anzio Zucchi. Subsequently, she obtained the class victory and the third place overall in the 500 km of the Nurburgring with the driver Hans Hermann. Another noteworthy result was the class victory in the Aosta Pila climb with Leo Cella.

In 1968, after obtaining approval for Group 6, the 1000SP obtained the class victory in the Stellavena-Boscochiesanuova climb led by Paolo Lado and the first position at the 1000 km of Monza, a race valid for the Marche World Championship. Numerous other national and international successes followed.

== 2021 Abarth Classiche 1000 SP ==
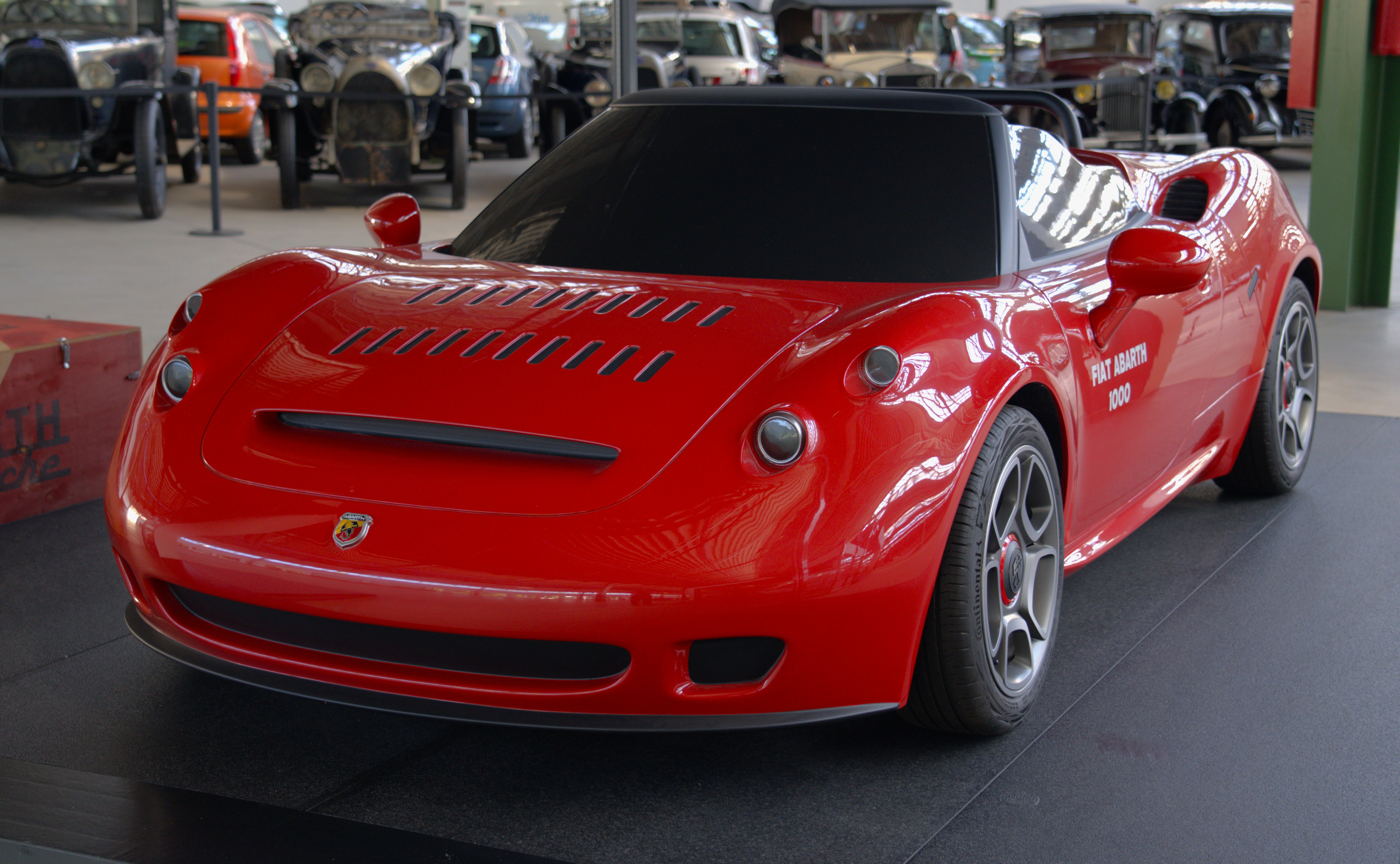
2021 Abarth 1000 SP at FCA Heritage Hub in Torino

A one-off concept was unveiled in 2021, a result of a joint project with Alfa Romeo that also led to the 2015 Alfa Romeo 4C which the 1000 SP shares some components with.
