= Abarth Classiche 1000 SP =

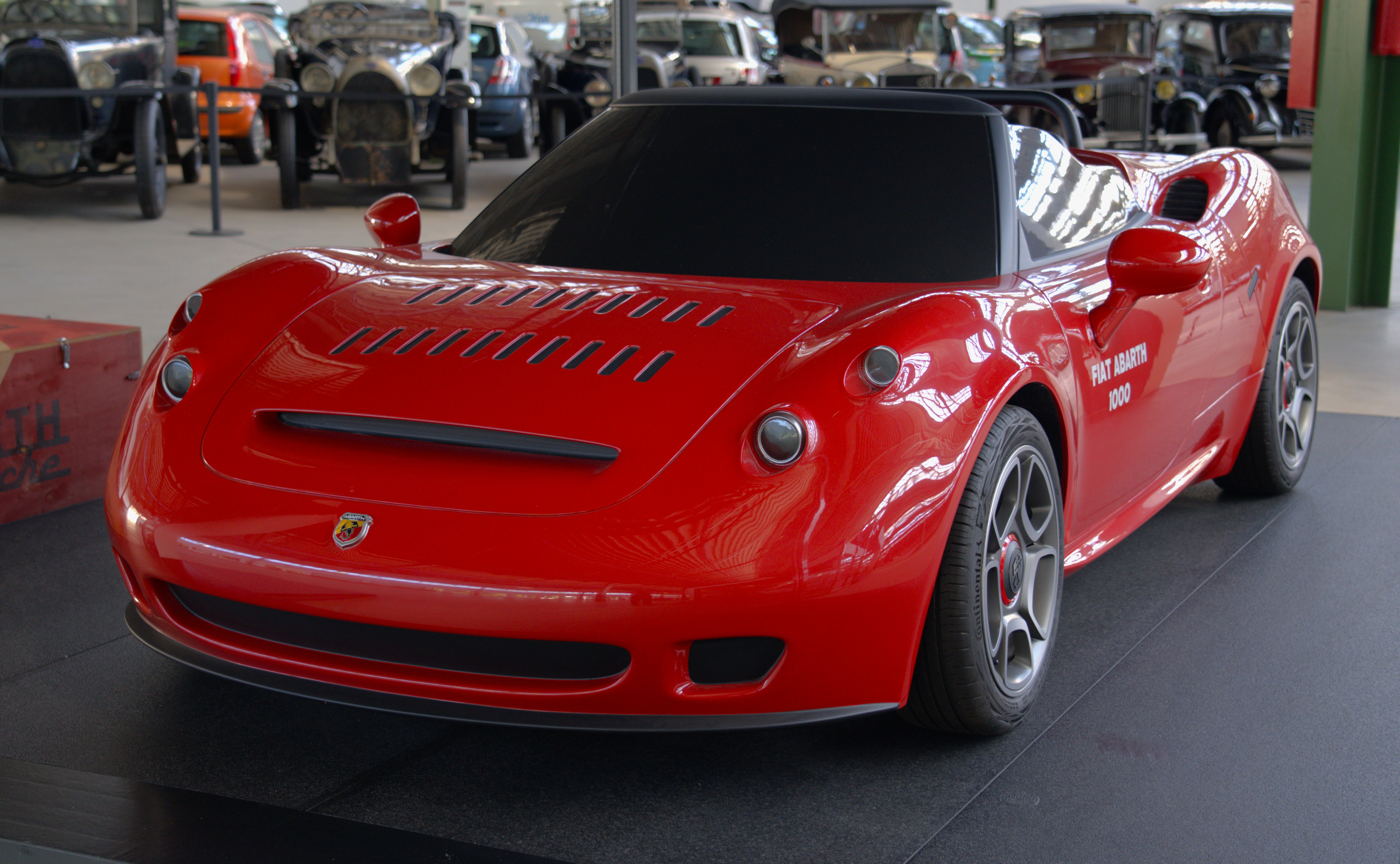

Overview
- Manufacturer: Abarth
- Also called: Abarth 1000 SP
- Production: 2021-2022; 5 made
- Designer: Roberto Giolito and Ruben Wainberg at Centro Stile Fiat

Body and chassis
- Class: Sports car (S)
- Body style: 2-door roadster
- Layout: Rear-mid-engine, rear-wheel-drive
- Related: Alfa Romeo 4C

Powertrain
- Engine: 1.75 L 1750 TBi turbo I4

Dimensions
- Curb weight: 1,074 kg (2,368 lb) (dry)

Chronology
- Predecessor: Fiat Abarth 1000SP (spiritual)

The Abarth Classiche 1000 SP is a limited production sports car of which only 5 units were made in 2022.

It was previewed by the Abarth 1000 SP concept, shown in early 2021, inspired by the original 1966 racing car.

Given that the Classiche 1000 SP is based on the Alfa Romeo 4C, it features the same turbocharged 1.75-liter four-cylinder engine which produces 240 PS (177 kW) at 6,000 rpm. Underpinning the car is the same hybrid chassis as the 4C, complete with a carbon fiber central cell, while the front uses aluminum in its construction.
