= Alfa Romeo 4C =

Two-seater sports car

Alfa Romeo 4C Alfa Romeo 4C Spider
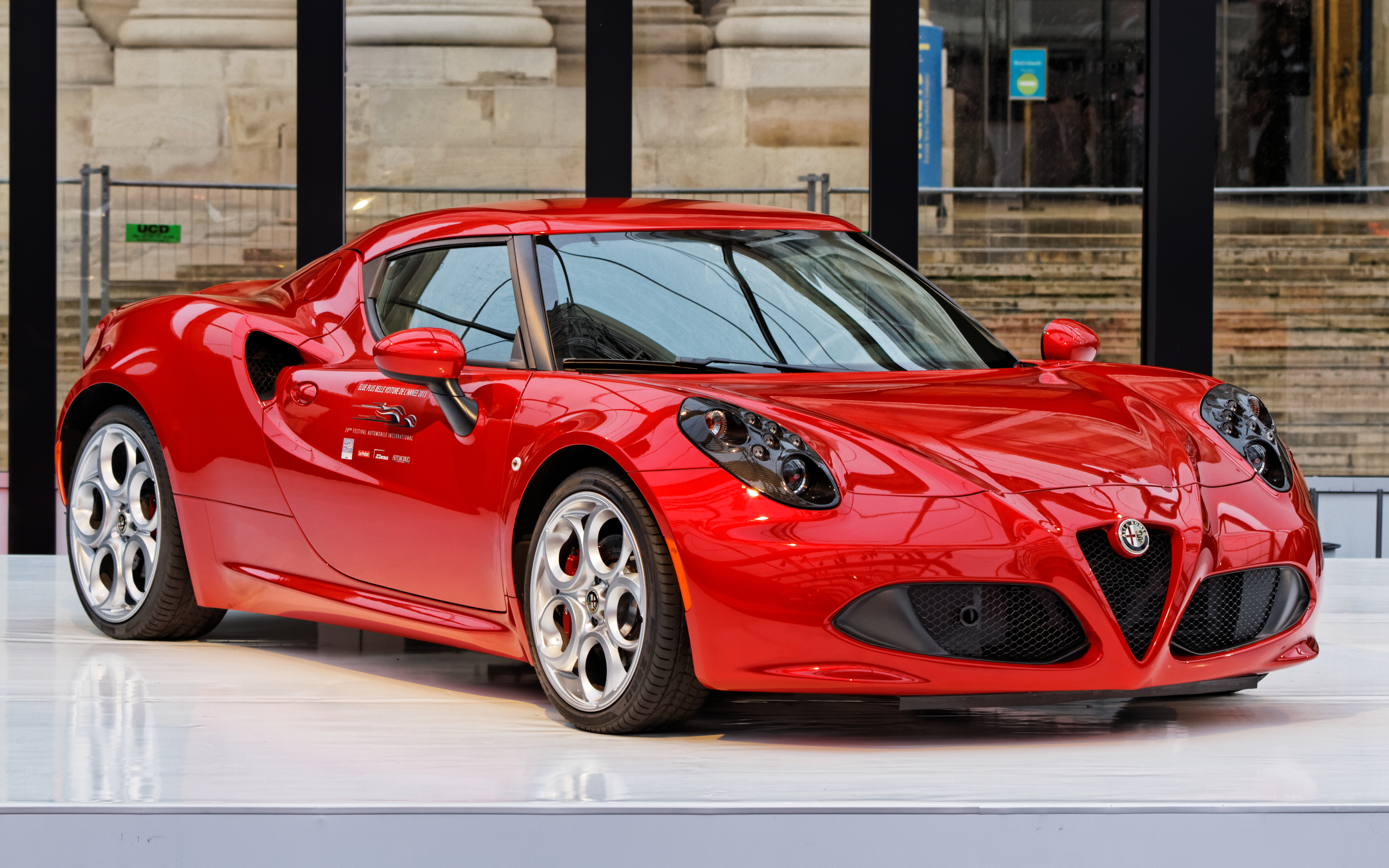

Overview
- Manufacturer: Fiat Group Automobiles (2013–2014); FCA Italy (2014–2020)
- Production: 2013–2019 (Coupé); 2015–2020 (Spider); 9,117 produced
- Model years: 2014–2020
- Assembly: Italy: Modena (Maserati S.p.A. plant)
- Designer: Marco Tencone under Lorenzo Ramaciotti at Centro Stile Alfa Romeo

Body and chassis
- Class: Sports car (S)
- Body style: 2-door coupé 2-door roadster
- Layout: Rear-mid-engine, rear-wheel drive
- Related: Abarth Classiche 1000 SP

Powertrain
- Engine: 1.75 L 1750 TBi turbocharged I4
- Transmission: 6-speed dual dry clutch transmission FPT C635

Dimensions
- Wheelbase: 2,380 mm (93.7 in)
- Length: 3,989 mm (157.0 in)
- Width: 2,090 mm (82.3 in) (including door mirrors); 1,864 mm (73.4 in)
- Height: 1,183 mm (46.6 in)
- Curb weight: 940 kg (2,070 lb) Coupé; 1,080 kg (2,380 lb) Spider; 1,118 kg (2,464 lb) Coupé (US); 1,136 kg (2,504 lb) Spider (US)

The Alfa Romeo 4C (Type 960) is a two-seat sports car which was manufactured by Maserati and marketed by Alfa Romeo from 2013 until 2020. It was initially made only as a two-door coupé, with a two-door roadster version added in 2015. It has a rear mid-engine, rear-wheel-drive layout, with the 4C name referring to its straight-four engine. The 4C was designed by Marco Tencone and Lorenzo Ramaciotti at Centro Stile Alfa Romeo and was the first car sold in the United States by the Italian brand since 1995.

== History ==
=== Alfa Romeo 4C Concept (2011) ===
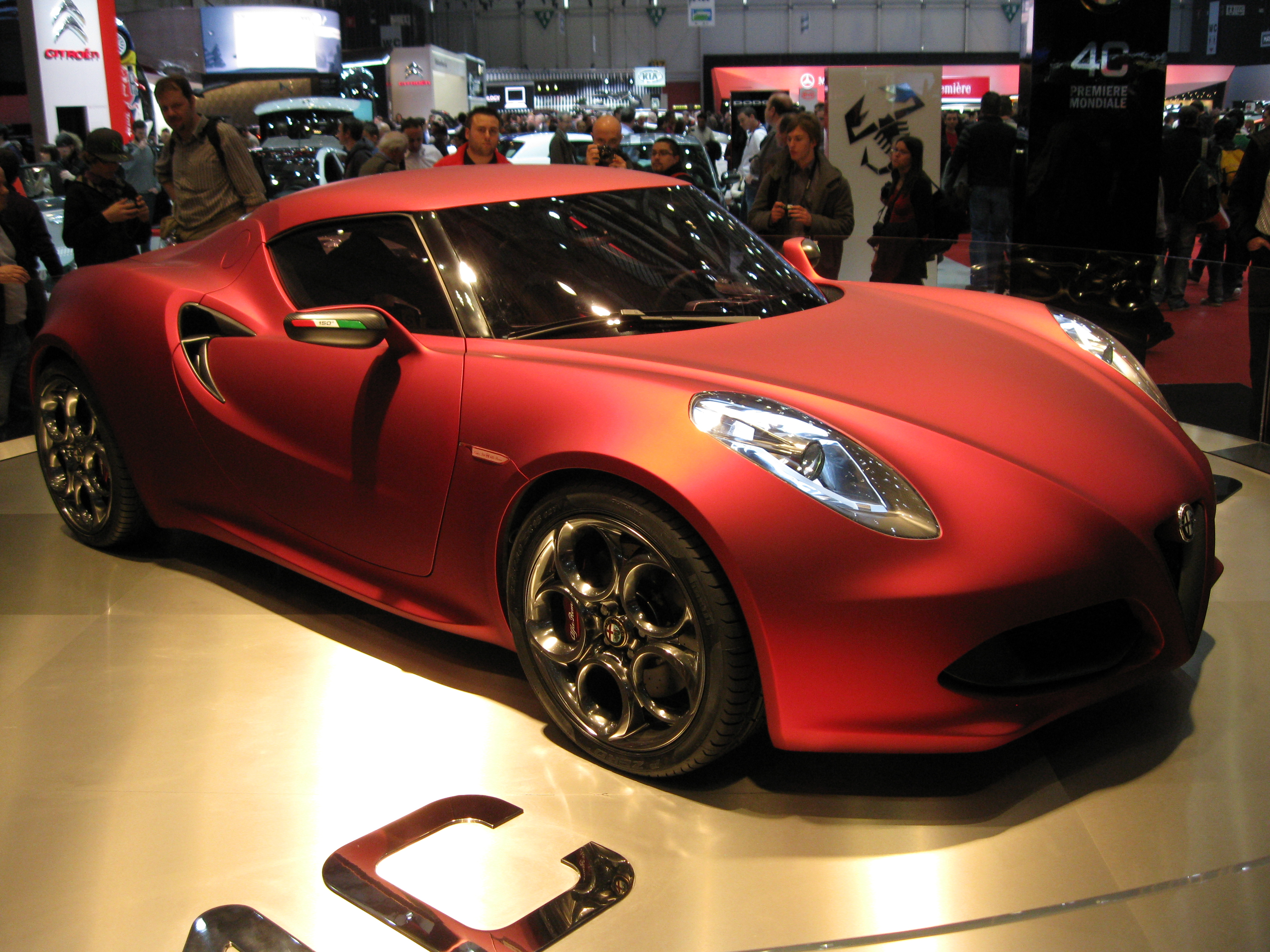
4C Concept

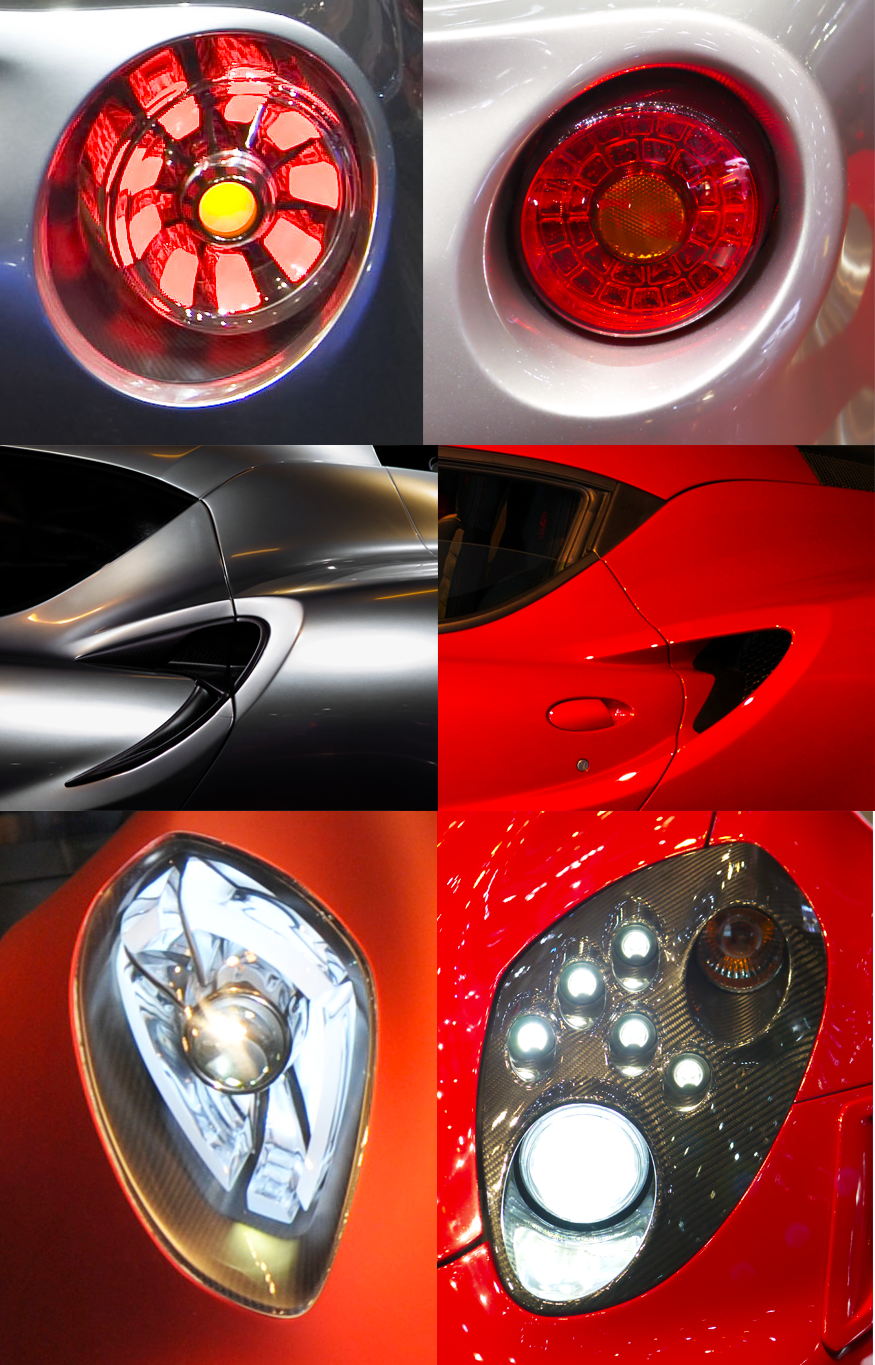
Differences between the 4C concept (left) and the European spec production model 4C (right)

The Alfa Romeo 4C Concept is a two-seater, rear-wheel drive coupé with technology and materials derived from the Alfa Romeo 8C Competizione, with a 1750 cc turbo petrol engine with direct injection, the "Alfa TCT" twin dry clutch transmission, and the Alfa DNA dynamic control selector.

The 4C concept version was unveiled in the 81st Geneva Motor Show in March 2011, followed by the Mille Miglia 2011 parade, Goodwood Festival of Speed 2011, 2011 Frankfurt Motor Show.

It was displayed for the first time outside in Concorso d'Eleganza Villa d'Este in 2012. Compared to the production version, it is very similar, with the biggest differences being front lights, side vents and mirrors.

==== Awards ====
The Alfa Romeo 4C Concept was voted the 'Most Beautiful Concept Car of the Year' award by the readers of German magazine Auto Bild, and won the Auto Bild Design Award 2011. It was awarded the "Design Award for Concept Cars & Prototypes" by referendum of the public in Villa d'Este.

=== Launch ===
The production car was unveiled at the 2013 Geneva Motor Show, followed by 2013 Essen 'Techno Classica', Goodwood Festival of Speed 2013, Moscow Raceway, 2013 Frankfurt Motor Show.

The bare '4C000' chassis was also shown at the 2013 Geneva Motor Show.

Ordering of European models began in October 2013 at Alfa Romeo dealerships in Europe.

==== Marketing ====
As part of the Alfa Romeo 4C launch, Alfa Romeo Style Centre and Compagnia Ducale designed a 4C IFD (Innovative Frame Design) Bicycle, inspired by the Alfa Romeo 4C coupé. The vehicle went on sale in December 2013 and marketed in Europe, Asia and America.

=== Production ===
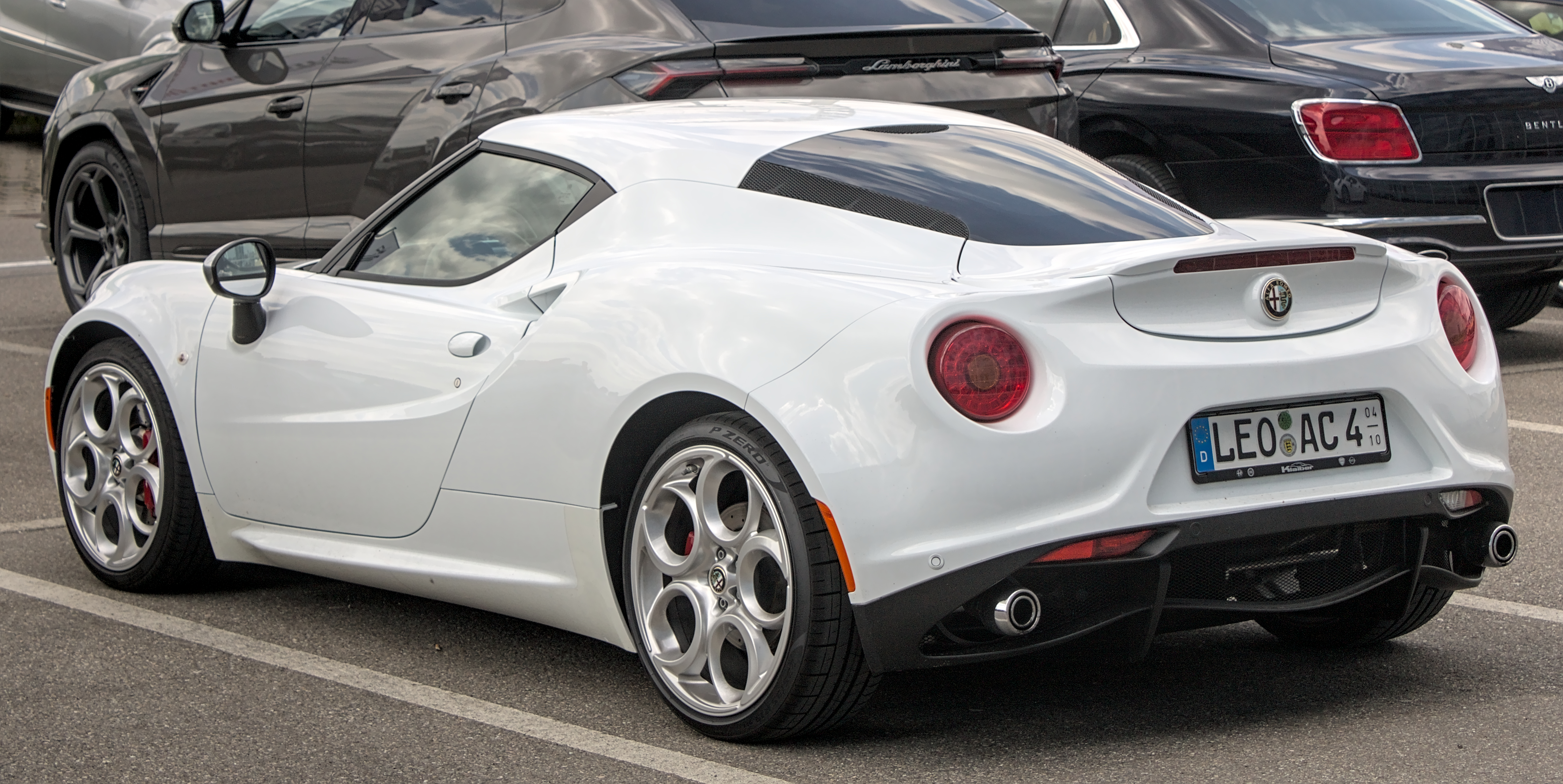
Rear view

Production of the 4C began May 2013 at Maserati's plant in Modena, with an expected production of up to 2500 units per year. It was the first mass-produced Alfa Romeo model to be sold in the US market since 1995 when the 164 sedan stopped being sold in the US.

Production of the Alfa Romeo 4C was originally estimated to be over 1000 units per year, with an upper limit of 3500 units per year, depending on the quantity of carbon fiber chassis that can be built by the supplier Adler Plastic. Within the 3,500-unit quota, 1,000 units are earmarked for Europe.

Delivery of the European Alfa Romeo 4C Launch Edition took place at Balocco (Vercelli, Italy) Test Centre. In 2018, the 4C coupe was discontinued for the North American market. The 4C Spider, however continued to be sold there for model year 2019 and model year 2020. In other markets, such as Australia and Japan, both the coupe and Spider continued. In late 2020, a new tribute-edition named the 4C Spider 33 Stradale Tributo was announced.

== Specifications ==
=== Body and chassis ===
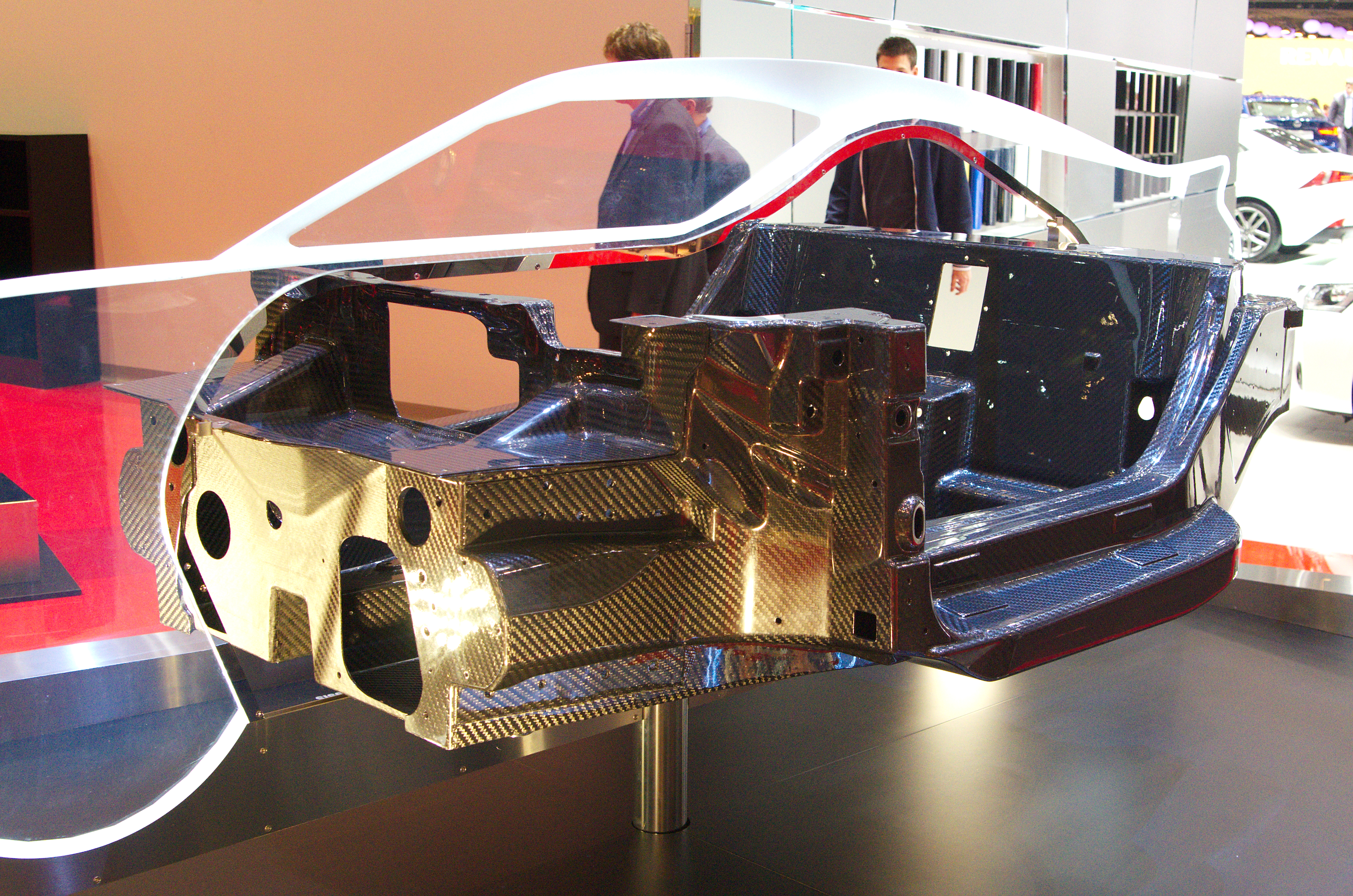
4C carbon frame

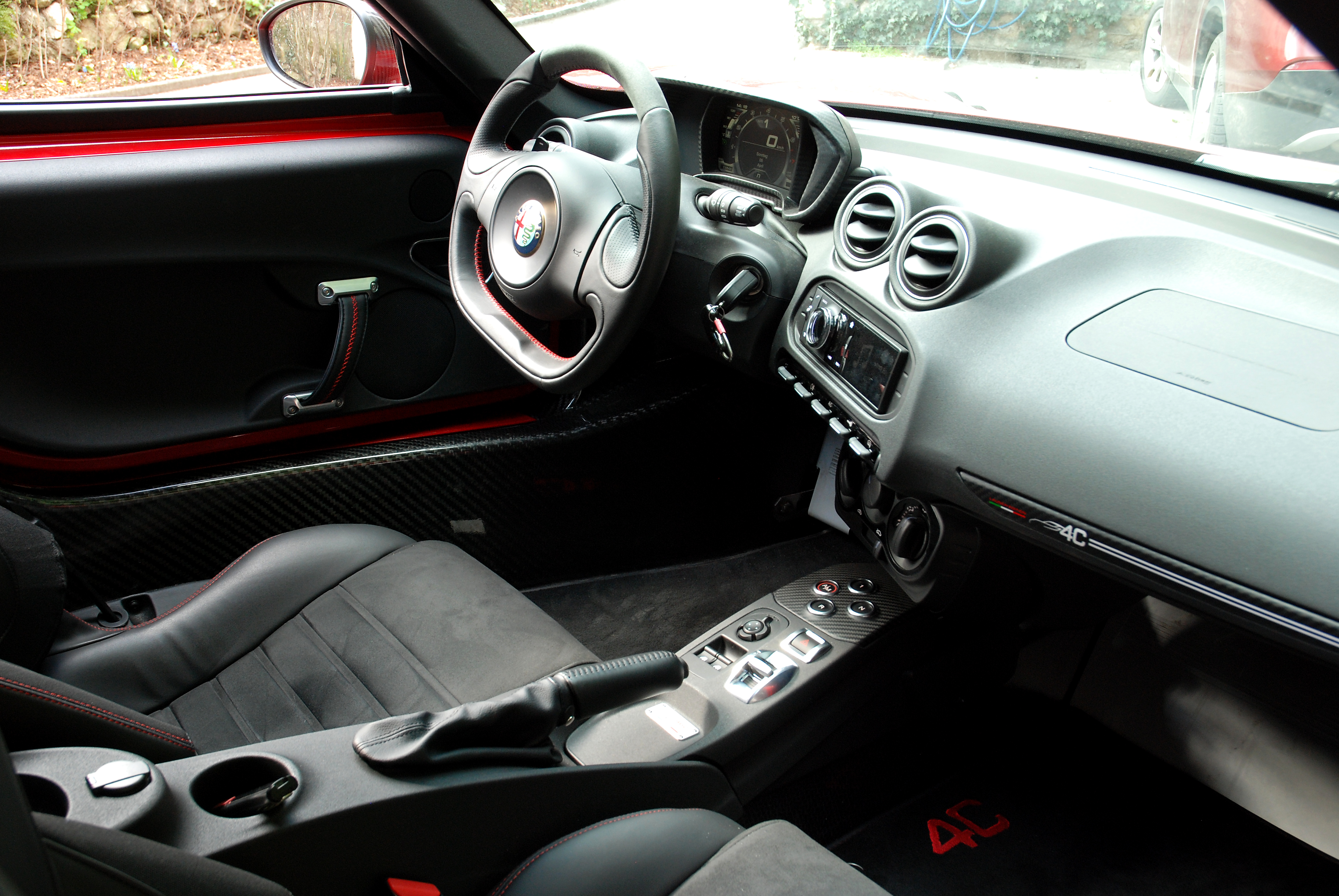
4C interior

The car was designed by Centro Stile Alfa Romeo (Style Centre) and developed by Alfa Romeo. The chassis is composed of a central carbon fiber tub, with aluminium subframes front and rear. The carbon fiber tub is produced by TTA (Tecno Tessile Adler) in Airola, as a joint venture between Adler Plastic and Lavorazione Materiali Compositi. The carbon fiber components that make up the chassis are cut using CNC technology.

The entire carbon-fiber monocoque chassis ("tub") of the car weighs 143 pounds (65 kg). Front and rear aluminium subframes combine with the tub, roof reinforcements and engine mounting to comprise the 4C chassis giving the vehicle a total chassis weight of 236 lb (107 kg) and a total vehicle curb weight of just 940 kg (2,070 lb). The 4C has a single carbon fiber body, similar to the body of many supercars. The outer body is made of a composite material (SMC for Sheet Moulding Compound) which is 20% lighter than steel. The stability is comparable to steel and better than aluminium.

The 4C employs double wishbone suspensions at the front and MacPherson struts at the rear. The resultant weight distribution is 38% on the front and 62% on the rear axle. Wheels and tires have different diameters and widths front and rear: 205/45 R17 front and 235/40 R18 back as standard, with optional 205/40 R18 and 235/35 R19. Both wheel options come equipped with Pirelli P Zero tires. The 4C uses vented disc brakes on all wheels; Brembo 305 millimetres (12.0 in) on the front and 292 millimetres (11.5 in) on the rear. The car can stop from 100 kilometres per hour (62 mph) in 36 meters. To save weight and increase steering feel, the 4C has no power steering. Its center of gravity height, at 40 centimetres (16 in) off the ground, is 7 centimetres (2.8 in) lower than that of the Lotus Elise.

=== Powertrain and performance ===
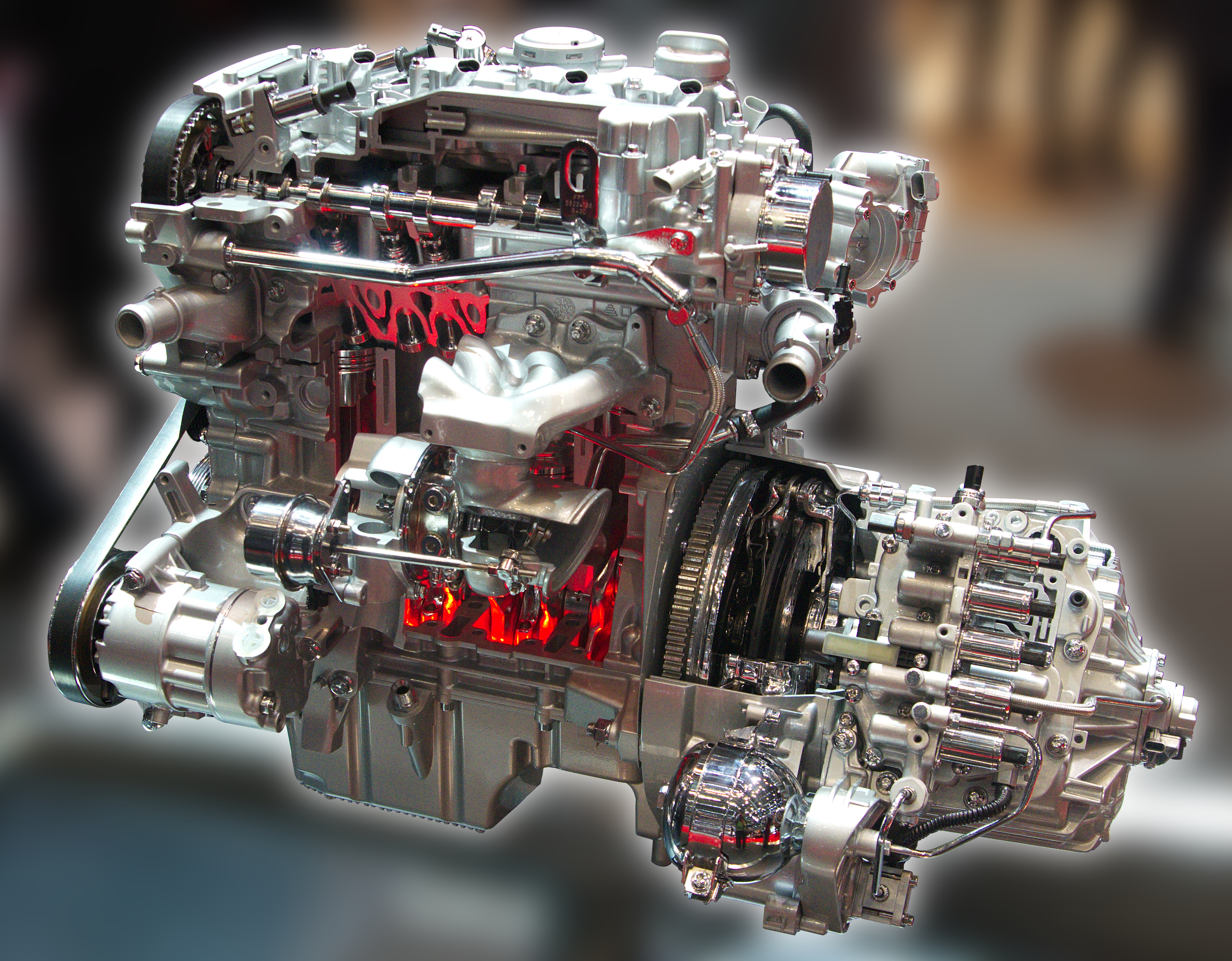
4 cylinder 1750 TBi (direct injection turbo)

The 4C uses a new all-aluminium 1.75 L (1,742 cc) inline 4 cylinder turbocharged engine producing 240 metric horsepower (177 kW) at 6000 rpm. The engine has been designed for minimum weight. The engine's combined fuel consumption 6.8 litres per 100 kilometres (42 mpg_{‑imp}; 35 mpg_{‑US}). 0–62 mph (0–100 km/h) acceleration is achieved in 4.5 seconds (slightly higher for the North American version due to its increased weight compared to the European counterpart) and the top speed is 258 kilometres per hour (160 mph), the power-to-weight-ratio being just 0.267 hp/kg (8.22 lb/hp). A journalist from Quattroruote car magazine demonstrated how the 4C accelerates from 0–100 km/h (0–62 mph) faster than 4.5 seconds. In race mode, with left foot on the brake pedal, if you pull the right shift paddle the engine will rev to 3500 rpm, but if you also pull the left paddle the engine will rev to 6000 rpm and 0–100 km/h (0–62 mph) time will go down to 4.2 seconds.

Italian car magazine Quattroruote published the lap time of 4C around Nürburgring. It lapped the ring in 8:04.

The 4C is equipped with a six speed Alfa TCT Dual Dry Clutch Transmission, and can be operated via gearshift paddles on the steering wheel. It also has an Alfa 'DNA' dynamic control selector which controls the behavior of engine, brakes, throttle response, suspension and gearbox. In addition to the modes already seen in Giulietta, the 4C has a new "Race" mode.

Specifications
Top speed	258 km/h (160 mph)
0–100 km/h (62 mph)	4.5 seconds
Type	Turbocharged straight-4
Displacement	1,742 cc (1.7 L; 106.3 cu in)
Power	240 PS (177 kW; 237 hp) at 6,000 rpm
torque	350 N⋅m (258 lb⋅ft) at 2,100-3,750 rpm
Lateral Acceleration	1.1 g

== Variants ==
=== North American version ===
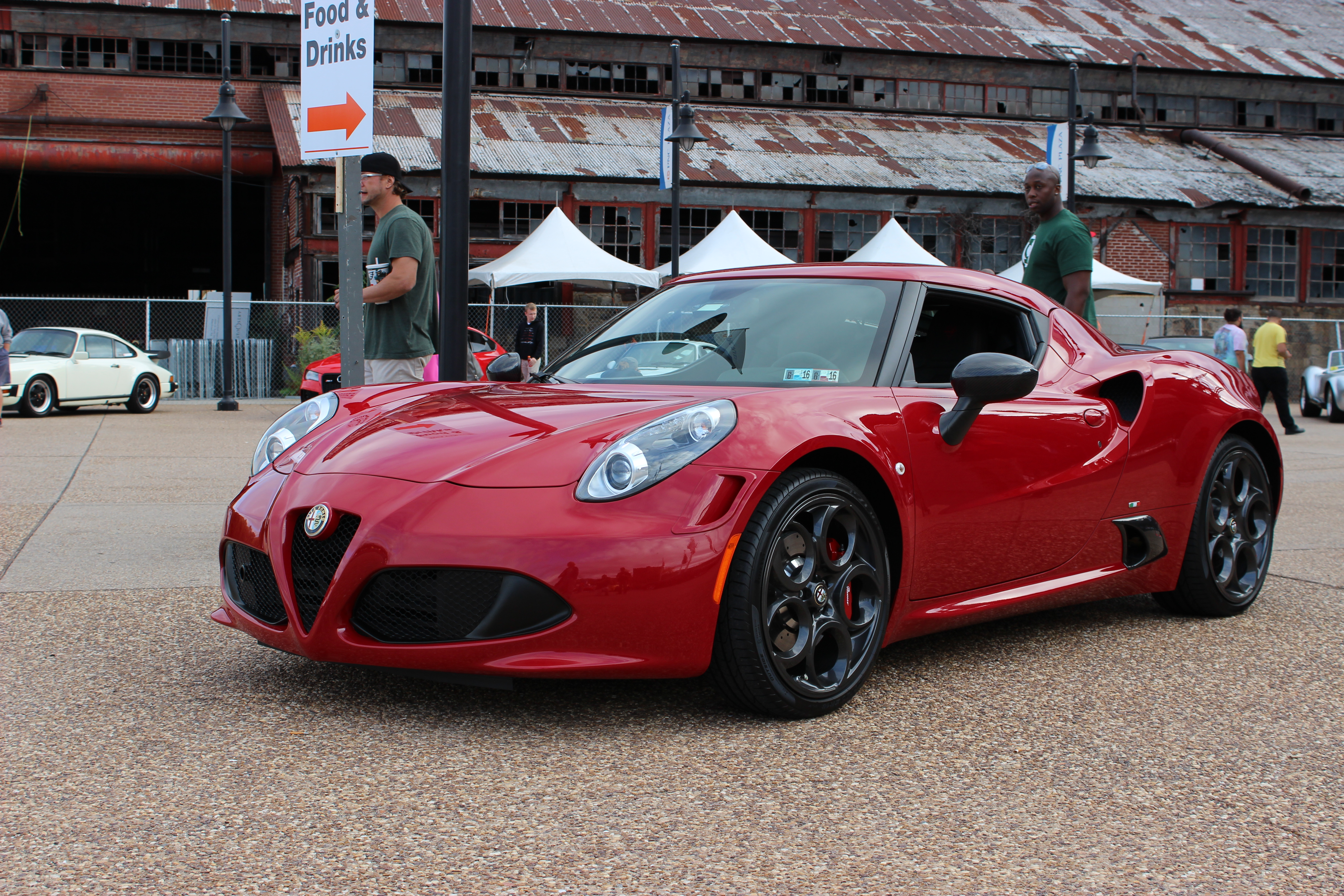
North American version of the Alfa Romeo 4C

The U.S. version of the 4C was introduced in the 2014 New York International Auto Show with the first 100 4C's being shipped to the U.S. early July, with a total of 850 being shipped by the end of 2014. The U.S. model includes extra bracing and strengthening required to meet U.S. crash regulations (including aluminium inserts in the carbon fiber chassis), resulting in 100 kg (220 lb) of weight increase. This version also has new headlamps similar to those seen before in the 4C Spider version.

In 2018, the 4C coupe was discontinued for the North American market due to US DOT NHTSA FMVSS 226 Ejection Mitigation. The regulation called for a progressive compliance date based on volume and, due to low volume, the 4C was allowed to continue until the last compliance date of 9/1/2017; thus all 2018 4C coupes in North America have build dates of 8/2017 or earlier. The 4C Spider, however, continued to be sold in North America for model year 2019 and model year 2020.

=== 4C Spider ===
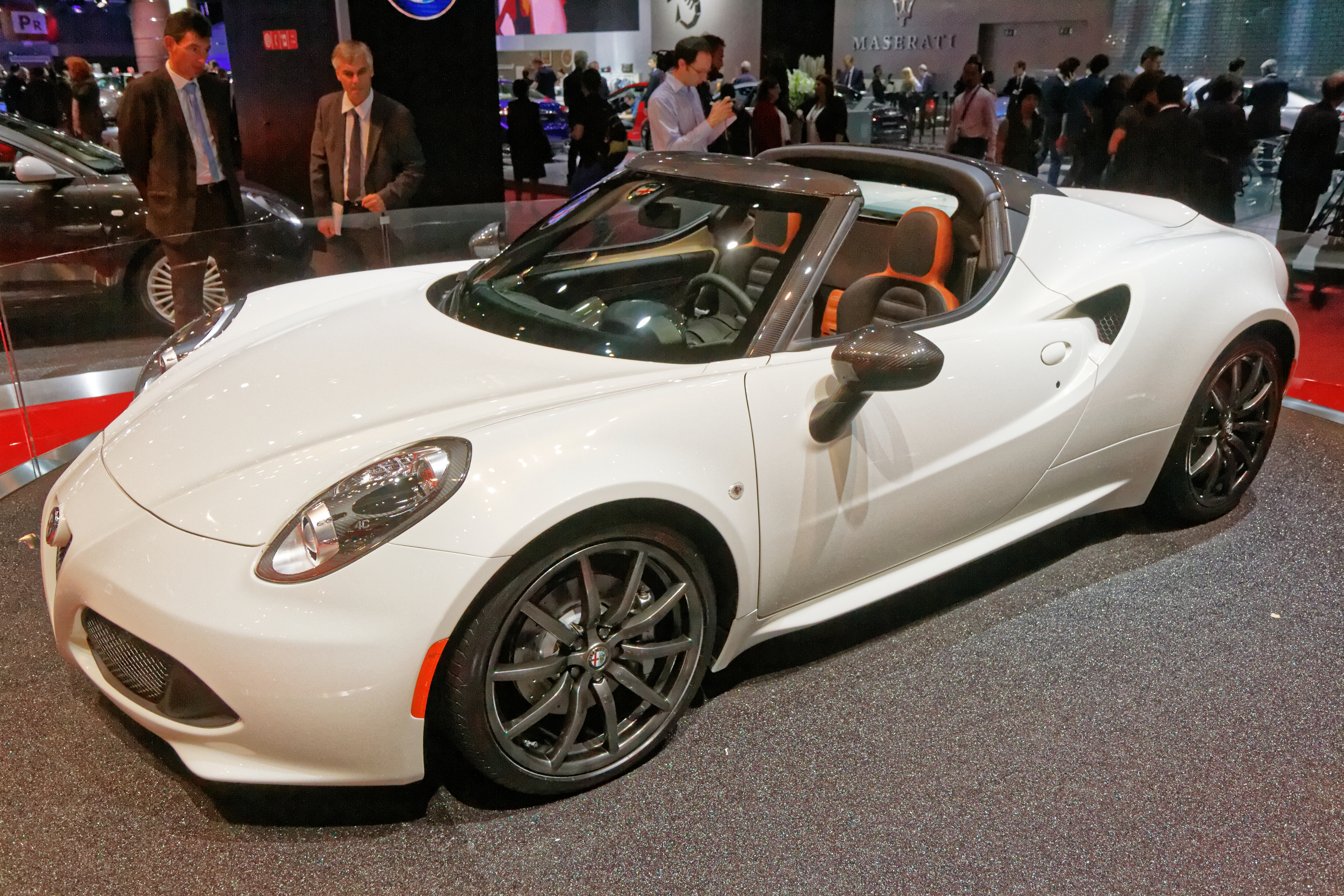
4C Spider

The Spider version of the 4C was previewed showing a pre-production prototype at the 2014 Geneva Motor Show. Sharing its engine with the Coupé version, the 4C Spider has different external parts such as the headlights, exhaust and engine hood, as well as a different roof section that features a removable roof panel. The North American spec 4C reflects a weight difference of only 22 lb (10 kg) (2,465 lbs vs. 2,487 lbs) for the Spider variant. Top speed is quoted at 257 km/h (160 mph) and acceleration from 0 to 100 km/h (62 mph) at 4.5 seconds.

== Limited Editions ==
=== 4C Launch Edition ===
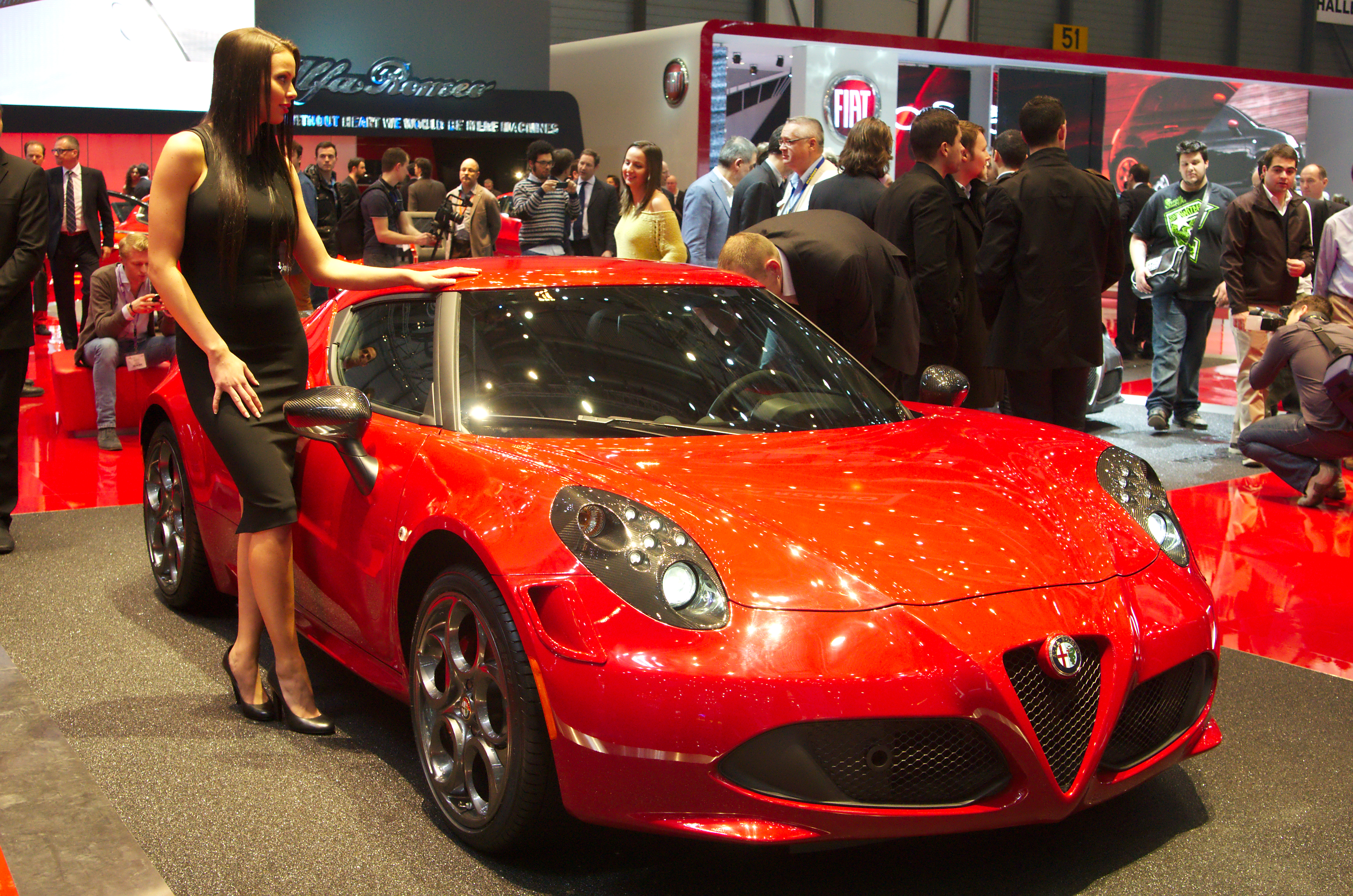
Alfa Romeo 4C Launch Edition (European model)

The 4C Launch Edition was a limited and numbered edition, unveiled at the vehicle's launch at the 2013 Geneva Motor Show. The vehicle came in a choice of four paint colors (Rosso Alfa, Rosso Competizione tri-coat, Madreperla White tri-coat or Carrara White matte). 500 examples were reserved for Europe/ROW, 500 for North America, 88 for Australia (Rosso Alfa and Madreperla White only), 200 to Japan and 100 for the Middle East. Note that the original press release cited 500 for North America, 400 Europe, and 100 ROW; however, the plaques on actual cars suggest that more were built and are the numbers referenced above.

Distinguishing features of the Launch Edition were carbon fiber trim (including headlight housings, spoiler and door mirror caps), rear aluminium extractor with dark finishing, Bi-LED headlights, dark painted 18-inch front and 19-inch rear alloy wheels, additional air intakes on the front fascia, red brake calipers, racing exhaust system, BMC air cleaner, specific calibration for shock absorbers and rear anti-roll bar, leather/fabric sports seats with parts in Alcantara and a numbered plaque. Alfa Red colored cars got matching red stitching on the steering wheel, handbrake, mats, handles and sports seats.

In Europe the vehicle went on sale for 60,000 euros including VAT.

=== 4C Competizione ===
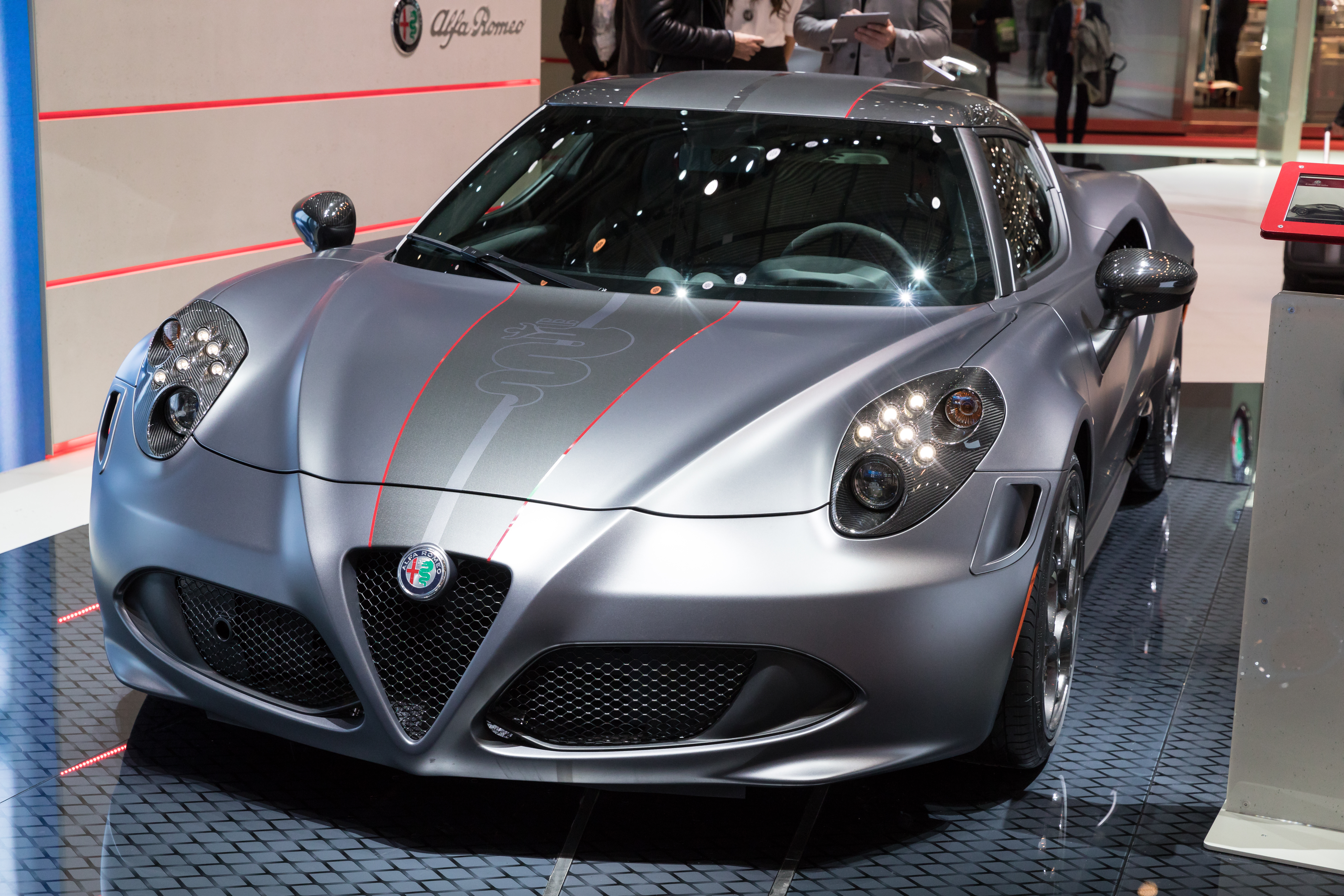
4C Competizione Limited Edition

The 4C Competizione is a limited-edition version of the 4C introduced in the 2018 Geneva Motor Show, finished in matte Vesuvio Grey, with carbon details on the roof, rear spoiler, mirror caps, side air vents and headlight moulding. The run reportedly consisted of 108 units. The Japanese market received 25 units, and 10 units were assigned to Australia. The US-market received no Competizione editions.

=== 4C Spider Italia ===
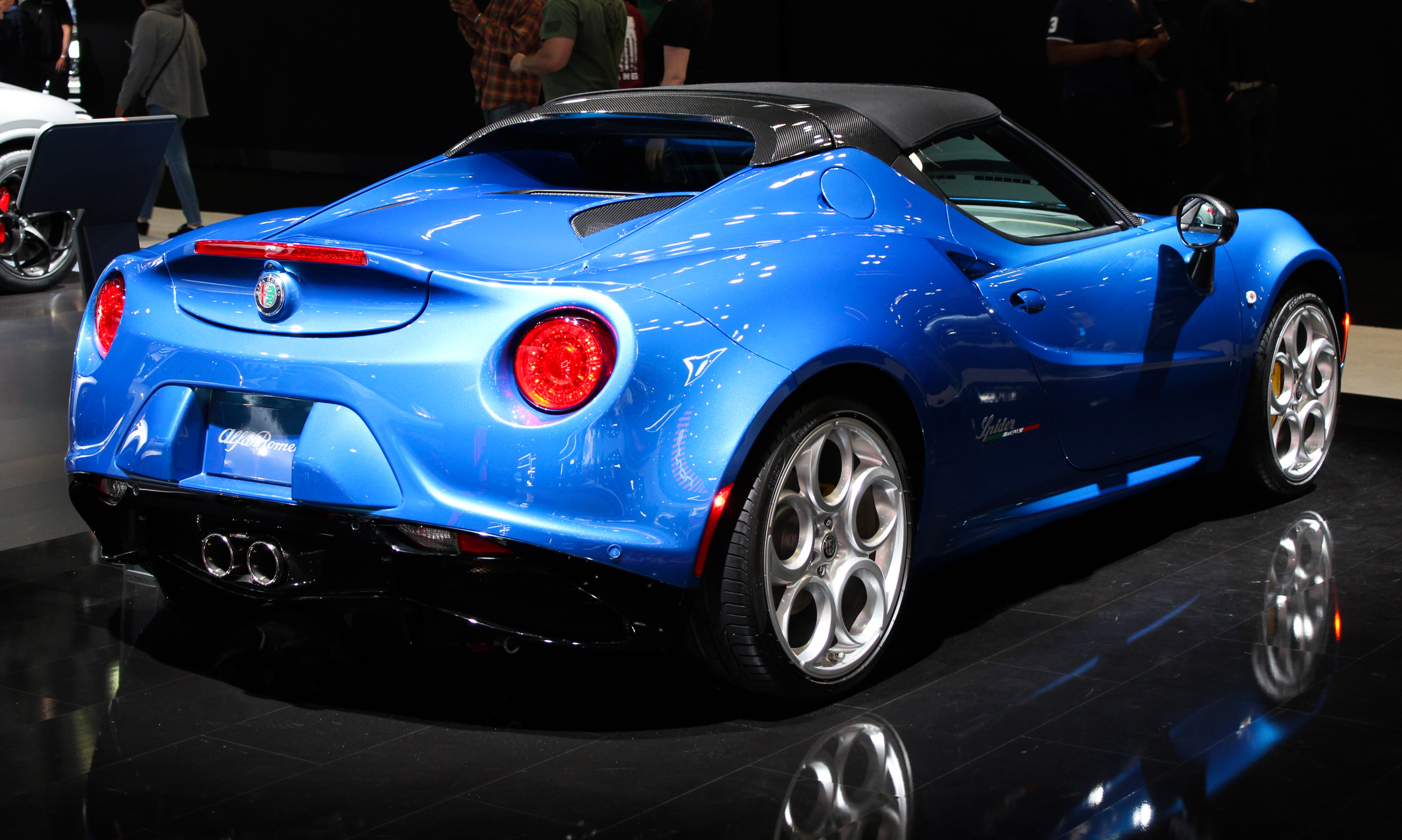
4C Spider Italia Limited Edition

First introduced in 2018, it was originally a limited edition of 108, with 15 cars going to Japan. In 2020 Alfa added 16 units for North America (15 in USA and 1 in Canada), thus the number of 4C Italias globally is believed to be 124. This limited version has Misano Blue Metallic paint; and front air intake and rear diffuser finished in Piano Black. A special Spider Italia emblem adorns the rear fenders, and the design features the Italian flag. The inside has an aluminium 4C Spider Italia plaque on the center console.

=== 4C Spider 33 Stradale Tributo ===
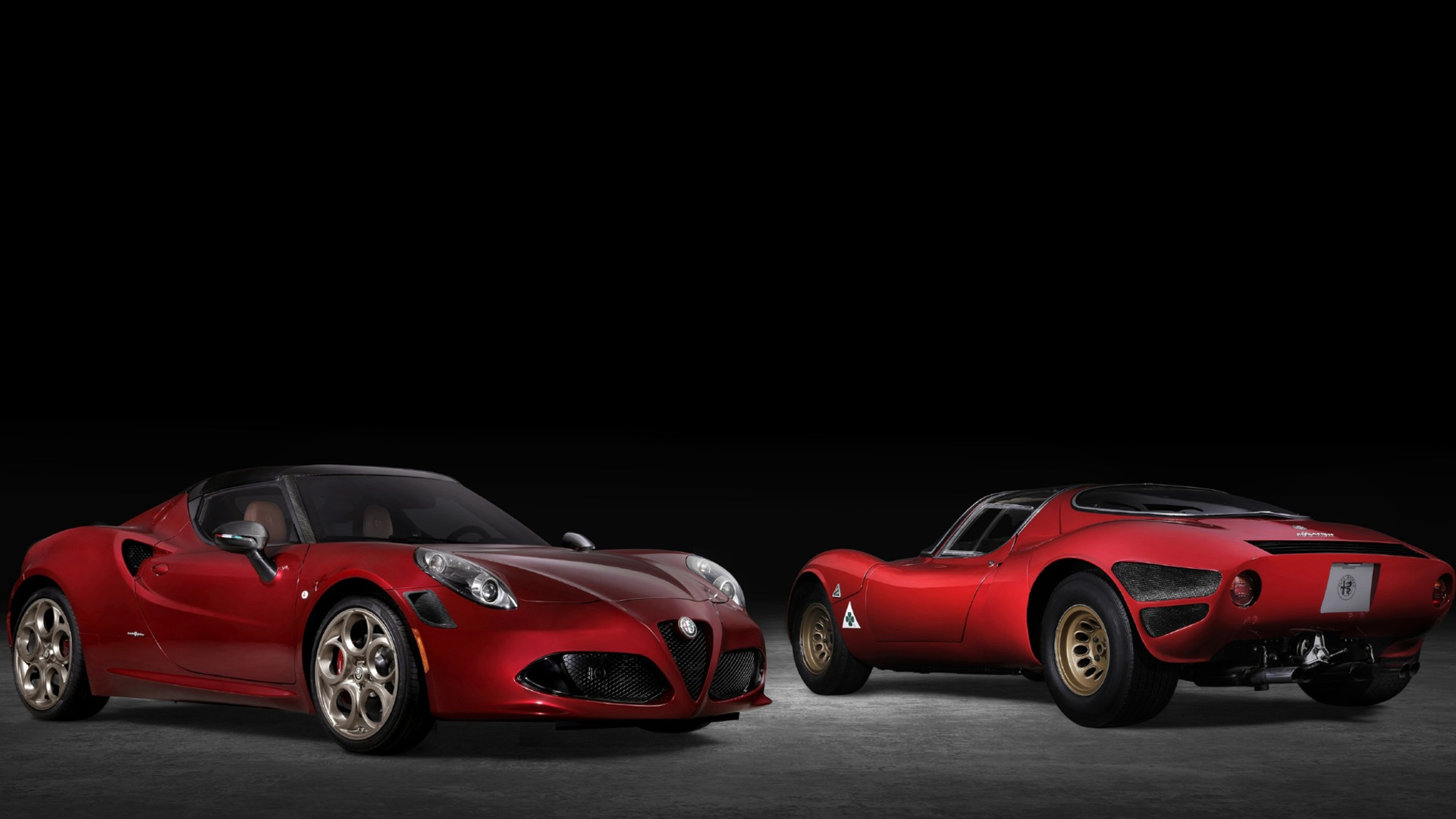
2020 4C Spider 33 Stradale Tributo

To commemorate the end of 4C production, Alfa Romeo announced the 4C Spider 33 Stradale Tributo. It is a tribute to the Alfa Romeo 33 Stradale, and limited to 33 cars for North America. Of the 33 North American cars, 22 were allocated to US dealers, 10 were allocated to Canadian dealers, and one, #33/33, was to be given to an FCA executive based on an internal application process - internal dealer documents called this the "Mike Manley" car. Australia received 15 Tributos while Japan received 50 cars. Note that in Australia and Japan the Tributo was available in both Coupe and Spider configurations.

The 4C Spider 33 Stradale Tributo features exclusive Rosso Villa d'Este tri-coat paint, gray-gold wheels, and a two-tone "tobacco" (brown) leather and black micro-fiber interior. In a first for Alfa Romeo, the 4C Spider 33 Stradale Tributo also features a red carbon fiber tub. It also includes a unique numbered plaque, and a book detailing the 4C and 33 Stradale. Since the 4C Spider 33 Stradale Tributo was meant to be an expression of the best of a 4C, it included all available options, such as the Akropovic exhaust, carbon fiber halo, Club Italia flag mirrors, and race-tuned suspension as standard.

== Motorsport ==
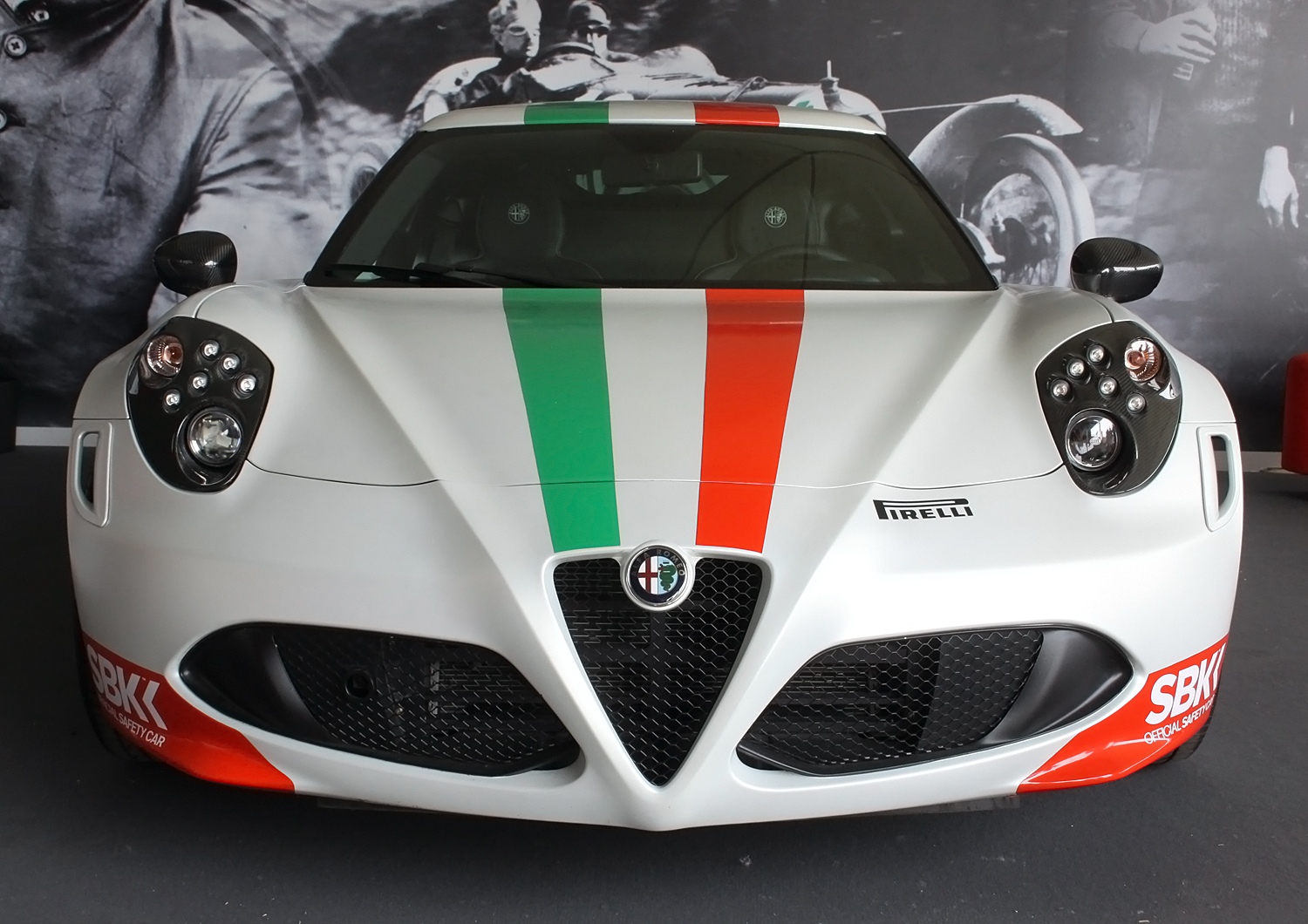
4C 2013 SBK official safety car

On September 12, 2013, an Alfa Romeo 4C (with Pirelli P Zero Trofeo tires) driven by Horst von Saurma completed the Nürburgring Nordschleife circuit in 8 minutes 4 seconds.

The Alfa Romeo 4C has been used as the official safety car of the SBK Superbike World Championship since the 2013 season, except at Laguna Seca, where another FCA product, the Dodge Challenger, is used, owing to FCA traditionally giving the Dodge brand exposure since the Alfa Romeo was not available in the United States at the time.

=== Alfa Romeo 4C Picchio ===
A private tuning and racing firm, Picchio S.p.a., created a limited production race prepared Alfa Romeo 4C. The Alfa Romeo 4C Picchio is powered by a new 4-cylinder turbo 1750 cc engine with 600 horsepower (CV) and equipped with a Hewland sequential semi automatic gearbox operated with steering wheel controls and suspension redesigned for use with Pirelli PZero 13 inch tires. The car is fully race prepared with FIA certificate and contains the mandatory roll cage, cut-off switches, and with all interior removed except for a new bucket seat and race harness. The prototype of this car is being used in Italian Hillclimb events, though customers can specify to have their own car built to order at a price of 296,000 euros.

== Awards ==
Worldwide awards the Alfa Romeo 4C has received include:

- "Performance Car of the Year 2015" in the inaugural Association of Professional Motoring Press (APMP) Car and Van of the Year Awards in Ireland
- Joint "Overall Best Car" award in the Irish edition of The Sunday Times/CompleteCar.ie Best Cars Guide 2015 and "Best Driver's Car Under €75,000"
- "Most Beautiful Car of the Year 2013" at the 29th International Automobile Festival in France—with 41 percent of the votes, ahead of the BMW 4 Series (25% of the votes), Mercedes-Benz CLA (22%), and Mazda3 (12%). More than 100,000 votes were cast in more than 50 countries.
- Import sports car category in the Auto Motor und Sport "Best Cars 2014" awards—barely edging out the previous winner, Aston Martin Rapide S
- "Best Sports Car 2013" under the compact supercar category by El Economista vote
- Readers of Auto Zeitung named it winner of the "Sportscars/Imported" category of the 26th edition of "Auto Trophy" with 17.2% of the votes—beating out more expensive models like the Aston Martin V8 Vantage (16.6%) and the Jaguar F-Type (15.8%)
- What Car? Reader Award for "the most exciting car to be launched in 2013"
- FHM magazine named it 2013 Car of the Year
- WhichCar Australia Most Stylish Car for 2016
