= Geneva International Motor Show =

Annual Swiss auto show

Coordinates: 46°14′05″N 6°07′08″E

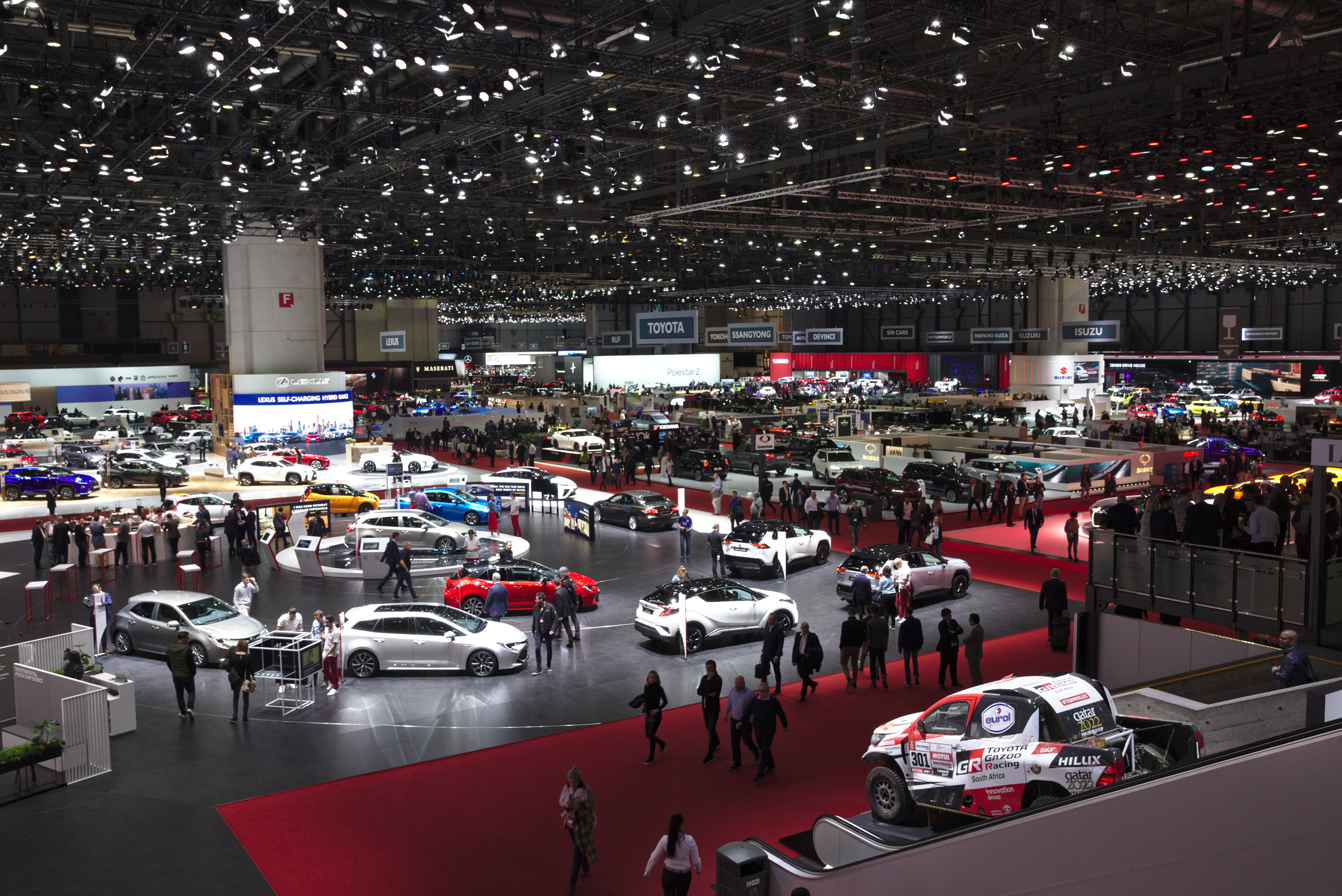
- Geneva International Motor Show (6 March 2019)
- Status: Inactive
- Genre: Auto show
- Frequency: Annually
- Location: Geneva
- Country: Switzerland
- Years active: 1905–2019, 2024
- Most recent: 2024
- Website: genevamotorshow.com

The Geneva International Motor Show was an annual auto show held in March in the Swiss city of Geneva.

The show was hosted at the Palexpo, a convention centre located next to the Geneva Cointrin International Airport. The Salon was organised by the Organisation Internationale des Constructeurs d'Automobiles, and was considered an important major international auto show.

First held in 1905, the Salon hosted almost all major internal combustion engined models in the history of the automobile, along with benzene- and steam-powered cars from the beginning of the century. Exotic supercars often steal the spotlight during their debuts at the show. Prototypes, new equipment, technical breakthroughs, international partnerships, as well as political and social debates, have been announced at the exhibition. The show was regarded as a level playing field for the world's automakers, aided by the fact Switzerland lacked an auto industry of its own.

The Geneva International Motor Show was not held in 2020–2023 due to the COVID-19 pandemic and its economic impact on the global automobile industry. The event returned for the last time in 2024.

In May 2024 the Geneva Show organizing committee decided to cancel the event for 2025 and beyond, citing a general lack of interest by manufacturers and competition from other shows. It shifted its focus to the show scheduled for November 2025 in Qatar.

== Sections ==
Areas of the show:

1. Motor cars, 3 or 4 or more wheels.
2. Electric cars and alternative powered cars.
3. Special bodywork for motor cars, car design, engineering.
4. Converted cars (tuners).
5. Accessories and parts for motor cars
6. OEM : original equipment manufacturers
7. Workshop installations for the repair and maintenance of motor cars
8. Miscellaneous products and services related to the car industry
9. Animation / Attractions.

The International Advanced Mobility Forum is the Geneva Motor Show forum on the mobility of the future.

== 2020s ==
=== 2025 ===
After the 2024 show, the organizers of the car show announced its closure. They will continue to organize the Qatar Motor Show, at Doha.

=== 2024 ===
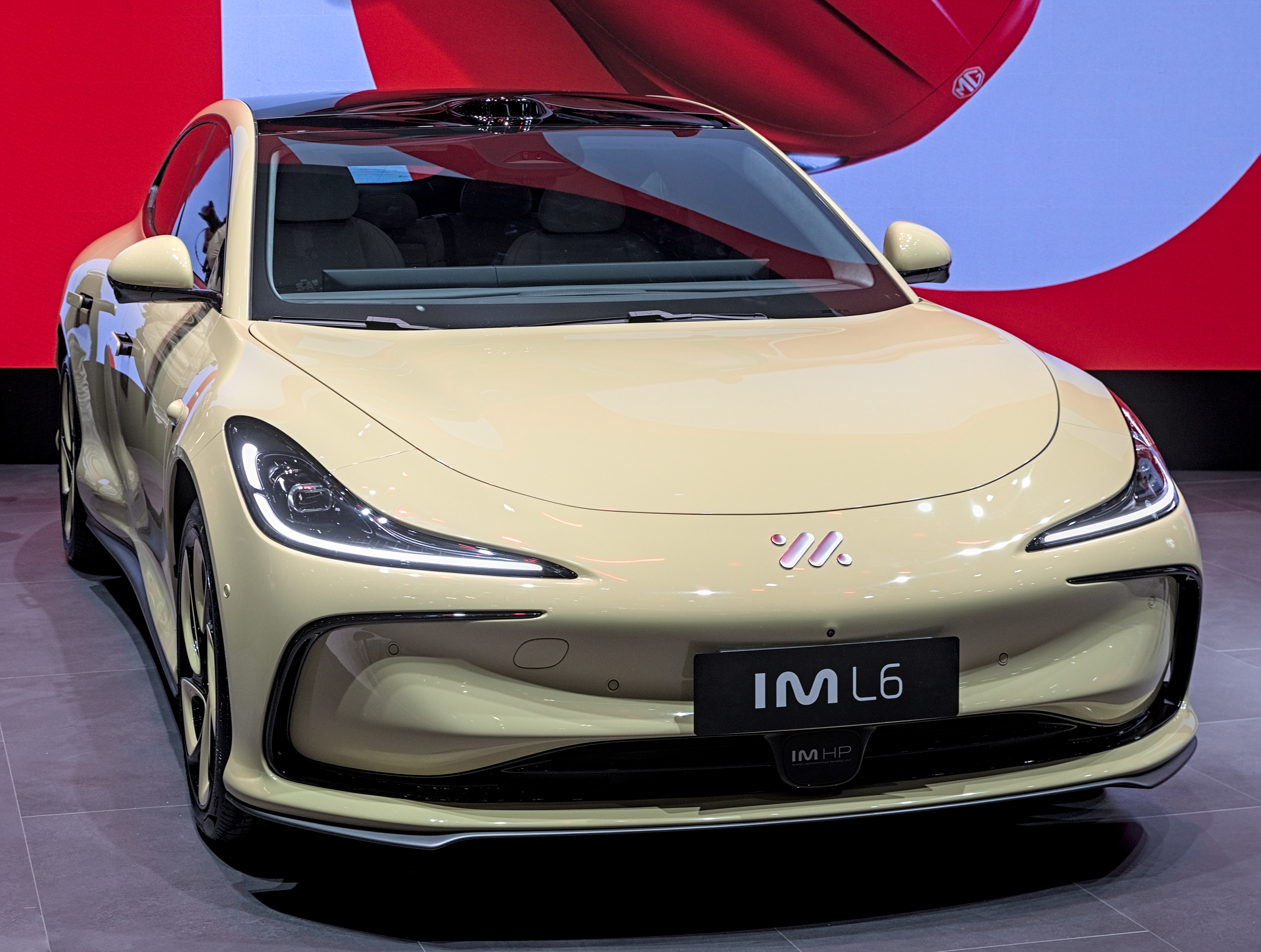
IM L6

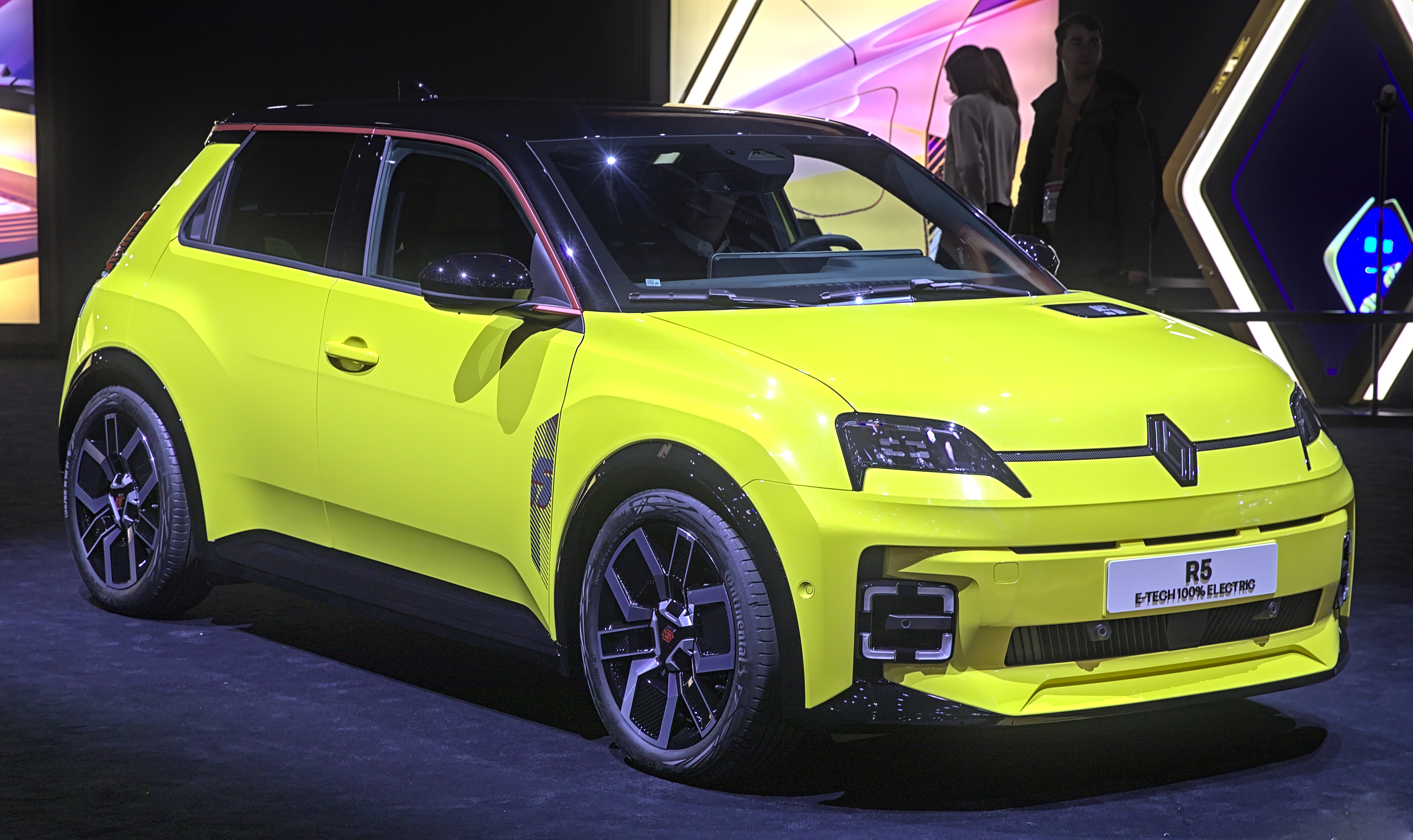
Renault 5 E-Tech

In July 2023, plans were announced for the 2024 Geneva Motor Show as the last event held from 26 February to 3 March, with a revised format to reduce costs for exhibitors. The 2024 edition highlighted serious organizational shortcomings, which resulted in lower participation or the total absence of some manufacturers. As of January 26, 2024, automakers that were confirmed to present at the show in 2024 were:

- Automobile Dacia
- BYD Auto
- IM Motors
- Isuzu
- Kimera Automobili
- Lucid Motors
- MG Motor
- Microlino
- Pininfarina
- Renault
- Silence Urban Ecomobility
- Totem Automobili

The following vehicles were first presented at the show:

- Dacia Duster (P1310)
- Denza N7
- Denza D9
- Foxtron Model B
- IM L6
- Lucid Gravity
- MG3
- new Microlino model
- MG9 EV
- MG S9 EV
- MG7
- Renault 5 E-Tech
- Yangwang U8

=== 2023 ===
The ongoing COVID-19 pandemic along with "uncertainties in the global economy and geopolitics" in 2022 led the organisers to cancel the Swiss location for 2023 (fourth year in row) and to postpone the Qatari location until October 2023. Another contributing factor was less commitments from the manufacturers for the Swiss location. The dates for the Qatar Motor Show were confirmed to be from 5 to 14 October 2023.

=== 2021 and 2022 ===
In 2021, the Geneva International Motor Show organisers entered into an agreement with Qatari government to hold biennial exhibitions in Qatar during the fourth quarter along with annual exhibitions in the Switzerland during the first quarter.

The 2021 and 2022 exhibitions were cancelled due to the continued COVID-19 pandemic measures. The Qatari location was to be held in November 2022, but it was postponed to 2023 for the same reason. The global chip shortage was also cited as a factor in the 2022 cancellation of Swiss location.

=== 2020 ===
The 90th Geneva Motor Show was planned for 5 to 15 March 2020, but it was cancelled due to the COVID-19 pandemic. Switzerland's decision to impose a limit on gatherings of over 1,000 people was cited as the reason for the cancellation. It was one of the first of many major automotive events to be cancelled due to COVID-19.

The following vehicles were to be presented at the show in 2020:

==== Production cars ====
- ABT Sportsline Audi RS 7 Sportback
- Aiways U5
- Alfa Romeo Giulia (upgrade)
- Alfa Romeo Giulia GTA/ GTAm
- Alfa Romeo Stelvio (upgrade)
- Alpine A110 Légende GT Edition
- Alpine A110 Color Edition
- Alpina XB7
- Aspark Owl
- Aston Martin DBX by Q
- Aston Martin Vantage Roadster
- Aston Martin V12 Speedster
- Audi A3 Sportback
- Audi RS 5 (facelift)
- Audi e-tron S Sportback Prototype
- Apex AP-1
- BAC Mono
- Bentley Continental GT Mulliner Convertible
- Bentley Mulliner Bacalar
- BMW 2 Series (F44) Gran Coupé
- BMW 330e Touring
- BMW M340d xDrive
- BMW M8 Competition
- BMW X2 xDrive25e
- Brabus 800 Adventure XLP
- Brabus 800 Black & Gold Edition
- Brabus D30 based on Mercedes-Benz GLE
- Brabus D40 based on Mercedes-Benz GLS
- Brabus Mercedes-Benz EQC Upgrade kit
- Bugatti Chiron Pur Sport
- Bugatti Chiron Noire Sportive
- Changan UNI-T
- Cupra León PHEV
- Cupra Formentor
- DS 9
- Ferrari Roma
- Fiat New 500
- Fiat 500X
- Fisker Ocean (European debut)
- Hofele Mercedes-Benz EQC
- Honda Civic Type R (facelift)
- Honda Jazz
- Hispano-Suiza Carmen Boulogne
- Hyundai i20
- Hyundai i30 (facelift)
- Karma Revero GT (European debut)
- Koenigsegg Jesko Absolut
- Koenigsegg Gemera
- Kia Seltos (European debut)
- Kia Sorento
- Kia Optima (European debut)
- Lexus LC 500 Convertible
- Lexus UX 300e
- Manifattura Automobili Torino New Stratos Racing
- Mansory Audi RS 6 Avant
- Mansory Bentley Continental GT V8 Cabrio
- Mansory Bentley Flying Spur W12
- Mansory Lamborghini Aventador SVJ Cabrera
- Mansory Lamborghini Urus Venatus
- Mansory Mercedes-AMG G63
- Mansory Mercedes-AMG G63 Star Trooper Pickup Edition by Philipp Plein
- Mansory Rolls-Royce Cullinan "Coastline"
- Mansory Xerocole based on Can-Am Maverick X3
- Mazda MX-30 EV (European debut)
- McLaren 765LT
- McLaren Elva
- McLaren GT Verdant Theme by MSO
- Mercedes-AMG E53
- Mercedes-AMG GLA35/ 45 S
- Mercedes-AMG GLE63 S Coupé 4MATIC+
- Mercedes-AMG GLS63
- Mercedes-AMG GT 73 4-door Coupé
- Mercedes-Benz E-Class (W213) (facelift)
- Mercedes-Benz E450 All-Terrain (facelift)
- Mercedes-Benz GLA (H247)
- Microlino 2.0
- Microletta Electric Trike
- Morgan Plus Four
- Pagani Huayra Roadster BC
- Pagani Imola
- Pininfarina Battista 'Anniversario' Special Edition
- Porsche 718 Boxster GTS 4.0
- Porsche 718 Cayman GTS 4.0
- Porsche 911 Turbo S
- Puritalia Berlinetta Project SuperVEloce
- Renault Captur PHEV 'E-tech'
- Renault Clio Hybrid 'E-tech'
- Renault Mégane Estate 'E-tech' Plug-in
- Renault Twingo Z.E.
- Rimac C Two
- Roland Gumpert Nathalie "First Edition"
- Smart EQ Fortwo
- Smart EQ Forfour
- SEAT León Mk4
- Škoda Octavia RS
- Škoda Kamiq Scoutline
- Suzuki Ignis (facelift)
- Toyota GR Yaris
- Toyota Yaris
- Toyota Yaris Cross (World debut)
- Toyota Mirai (European debut)
- Toyota Supra 4-cylinder
- Toyota RAV4 Plug-in Hybrid
- Volkswagen Caddy
- Volkswagen Golf Mk8 GTD
- Volkswagen Golf Mk8 GTE
- Volkswagen Golf Mk8 GTI
- Volkswagen T-Roc Cabriolet
- Volkswagen T-Roc R
- Volkswagen Touareg R Plug-in Hybrid
- Volkswagen ID.4 Prototype
- Zenvo TSR-S (refresh)

==== Concept cars ====
- Aiways U6 ion
- Alpine A110 SportsX
- Apex AP-0
- BMW Concept i4
- Czinger 21C Hybrid
- Dacia Spring Electric
- DS Aero Sport Lounge
- GFG Style 2030 eAWD (European debut)
- GFG Style Vision 2030 Desert Raid
- GFG Style Bandini Dora Barchetta EV
- Hyundai Prophecy EV
- IED Tracy EV
- Lexus LF-30 Electrified (European debut)
- Mercedes-Benz Vision AVTR
- Polestar Precept
- Renault Kangoo Z.E.
- Renault Morphoz
- Rinspeed metroSNAP
- RUF Rodeo
- Škoda Enyaq
- Vega EVX

== 2010s ==
=== 2019 ===
The 89th Geneva Motor Show was held between 7 and 17 March 2019.

==== Production cars ====
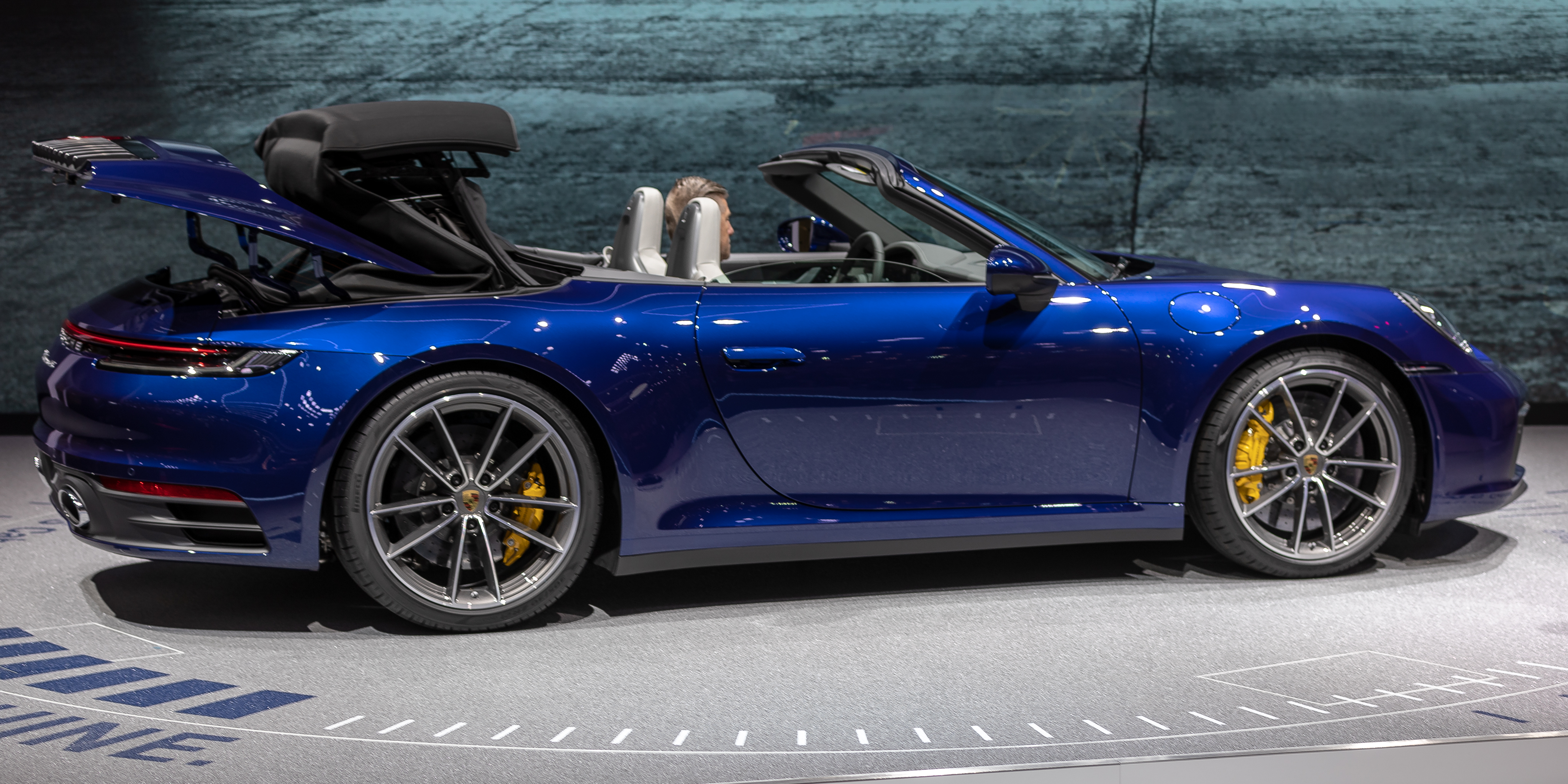
Porsche 911 Carrera 4S Cabrio

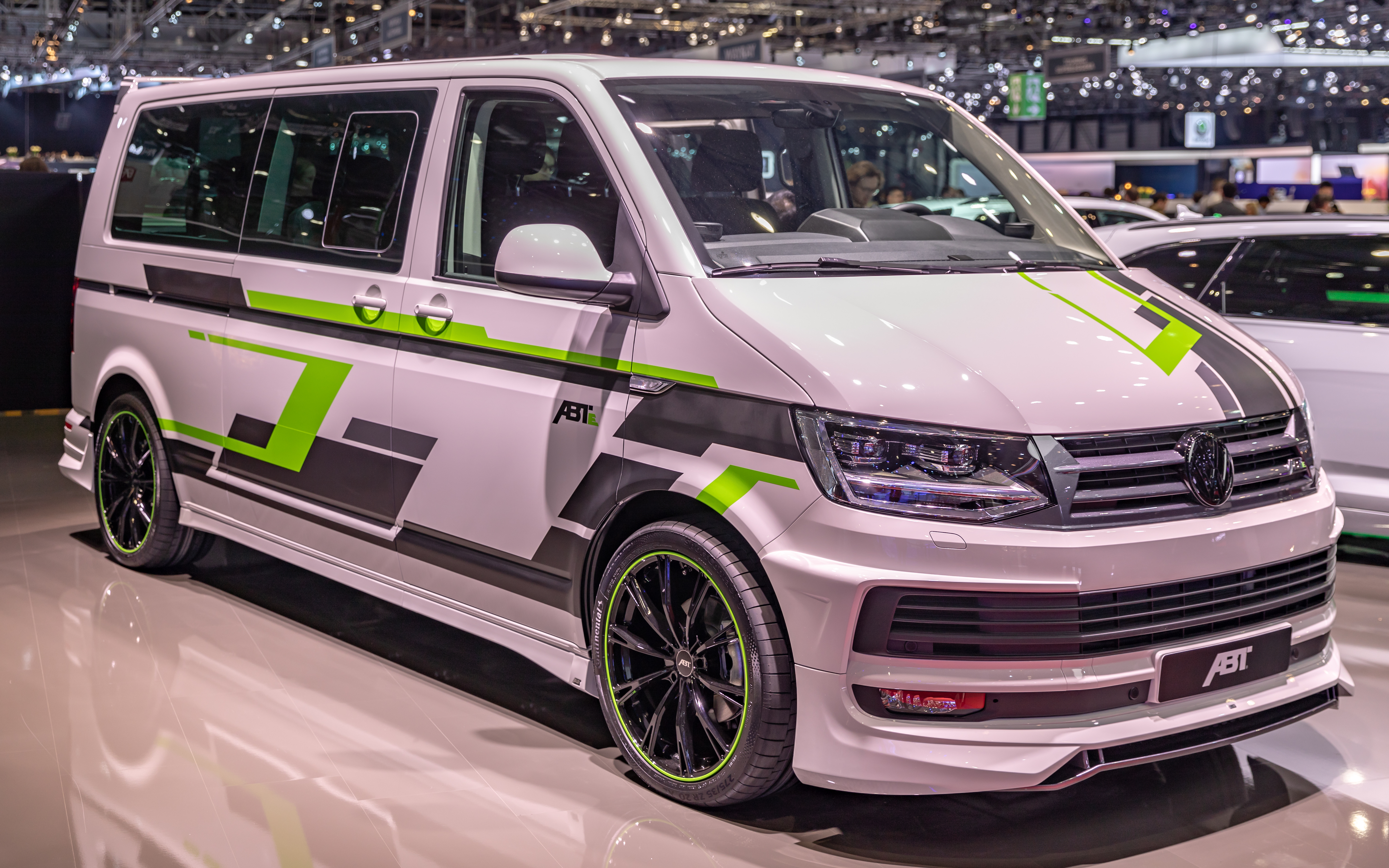
ABT e-Transporter

- Abarth 124 Rally Tribute
- Abarth 595 esseesse
- ABT Sportsline RS4+
- ABT Sportsline Audi A6 Avant
- ABT Sportsline Audi Q8
- ABT Sportsline Volkswagen e-Transporter
- Alfa Romeo Giulietta Veloce
- Alfa Romeo Giulia Quadrifoglio Racing Edition
- Alfa Romeo Stelvio Quadrifoglio Racing Edition
- Alfa Romeo Stelvio Ti
- Alpina B4 S Bi-turbo Edition 99
- Alpina B7 (facelift)
- Aston Martin DBS Superleggera by Q
- Aston Martin Valkyrie
- Aston Martin Vantage Cosmos Orange Edition
- Audi A6 PHEV
- Audi A7 Sportback PHEV
- Audi A8 PHEV
- Audi Q5 PHEV
- Audi SQ5 TDI
- Audi R8 V10 Decennium
- Aurus Senat
- Bentley Bentayga Speed
- Bentley Continental GT Convertible (European debut)
- Bentley Continental GT Number 9 Edition by Mulliner
- Bentley Mulsanne W.O. Edition by Mulliner
- BMW 330e Sedan
- BMW 7 Series (facelift)
- BMW 745e, 745Le, 745Le xDrive
- BMW 8 Series Convertible (European debut)
- BMW M850i xDrive Coupé Night Sky Edition
- BMW M2 Competition
- BMW M5 Competition
- BMW X3 xDrive30e
- BMW X5 xDrive45e
- BMW X7 (European debut)
- Brabham BT62
- Brabus 800 Widestar based on Mercedes-AMG G63
- Brabus 850 6.0 Biturbo 4x4^{2} Final Edition "1 of 5"
- Brabus 900 based on Mercedes-Maybach S650
- Brabus Ultimate E Shadow Edition
- Bugatti Chiron Sport "110 ans Bugatti"
- Bugatti Divo
- Bugatti La Voiture Noire
- Carrozzeria Touring Superleggera Sciadipersia Cabriolet
- Cupra Ateca Special Edition
- Ferrari F8 Tributo
- Fiat 500L Family 120th Anniversary Editions
- Fiat Panda Wind
- Fiat Tipo Sport 5-door
- Fornasari 311 GT "Gigi"
- Ginetta Akula
- Jeep Cherokee S/ Trailhawk
- Jeep Compass PHEV
- Jeep Compass S/ Night Eagle
- Jeep Renegade PHEV
- Jeep Renegade S/ Mopar
- Jeep Wrangler Rubicon 1941 (European debut)
- Kia e-Soul
- Koenigsegg Jesko Prototype
- Koenigsegg Regera KNC
- Lamborghini Aventador SVJ Roadster
- Lamborghini Huracán Evo
- Lexus RC F Track Edition (European debut)
- Mansory Bugatti Chiron Centuria
- Mansory Lamborghini Aventador Carbonado Evo Roadster
- Mansory Lamborghini Urus Venatus
- Mansory Mercedes-AMG G63 Star Trooper by Philipp Plein
- Mansory Mercedes-AMG S63 Apertus Edition
- Mansory Rolls-Royce Cullinan "Billionaire"
- Maserati Levante One-of-One
- Maserati Levante Trofeo Launch Edition
- Manifattura Automobili Torino New Stratos Rally
- Mazda 3 (European debut)
- Mazda CX-30
- Mazda MX-5 30th Anniversary Edition (European debut)
- McLaren 600LT Spider by MSO
- McLaren 720S GT3
- McLaren 720S Spider/ by MSO
- McLaren Speedtail
- Mercedes-AMG GT R Roadster
- Mercedes-AMG GLE 53 4Matic+
- Mercedes-AMG S65 Final Edition
- Mercedes-Benz CLA
- Mercedes-Benz GLC (facelift)
- Mercedes-Benz GLE (European debut)
- Mercedes-Benz SL 500 Grand Edition
- Mercedes-Benz SLC 300 Final Edition
- Mercedes-Benz V-Class (facelift)
- Mitsubishi ASX (facelift)
- Mitsubishi L200 (facelift)
- Mole Costruzione Artigianale Alfa Romeo 4C
- Morgan Plus 4 110 Works Edition
- Morgan Plus Six
- Nissan GTR-50 by Italdesign
- Nobe GT100
- Pagani Zonda C12 001
- Peugeot 208/ e-208
- Pininfarina Battista
- Polestar 2
- Porsche 718 Boxster T
- Porsche 718 Cayman T
- Porsche 911 Carrera S/4S Cabriolet (992)
- Porsche 911 GT2 RS Clubsport (European debut)
- Porsche Macan S (facelift)
- Porsche Panamera GTS
- Puritalia Berlinetta Hybrid
- Renault Alaskan Ice Edition
- Renault Clio
- Renault Twingo (facelift)
- Rolls-Royce Cullinan
- Rolls-Royce Phantom Tranquillity
- Rolls-Royce Wraith Black Badge "Galileo Blue"
- RUF CTR Yellowbird Anniversary
- Škoda Kamiq
- Škoda Scala
- SsangYong Korando
- Startech Aston Martin Vantage
- Startech Bentley Continental GT Coupé
- Subaru Forester e-BOXER
- Subaru XV e-BOXER
- Tata Motors Altroz/ Altroz EV
- Tata Motors Buzzard Sport
- TechArt GTStreet RS
- Tesla Model S Shooting Brake by RemetzCar
- Toyota Aygo X-Cite
- Toyota Corolla GR Sport
- Toyota GR Supra (European debut)
- Volkswagen Golf GTi TCR
- Volkswagen Multivan 6.1
- Volkswagen Passat (facelift)
- Volkswagen Passat Variant R-Line Edition
- Volkswagen T-Cross
- Volkswagen Touareg V8 TDI
- Zenvo TSR-S "Grotta Azzura" Blue

==== Concept cars ====
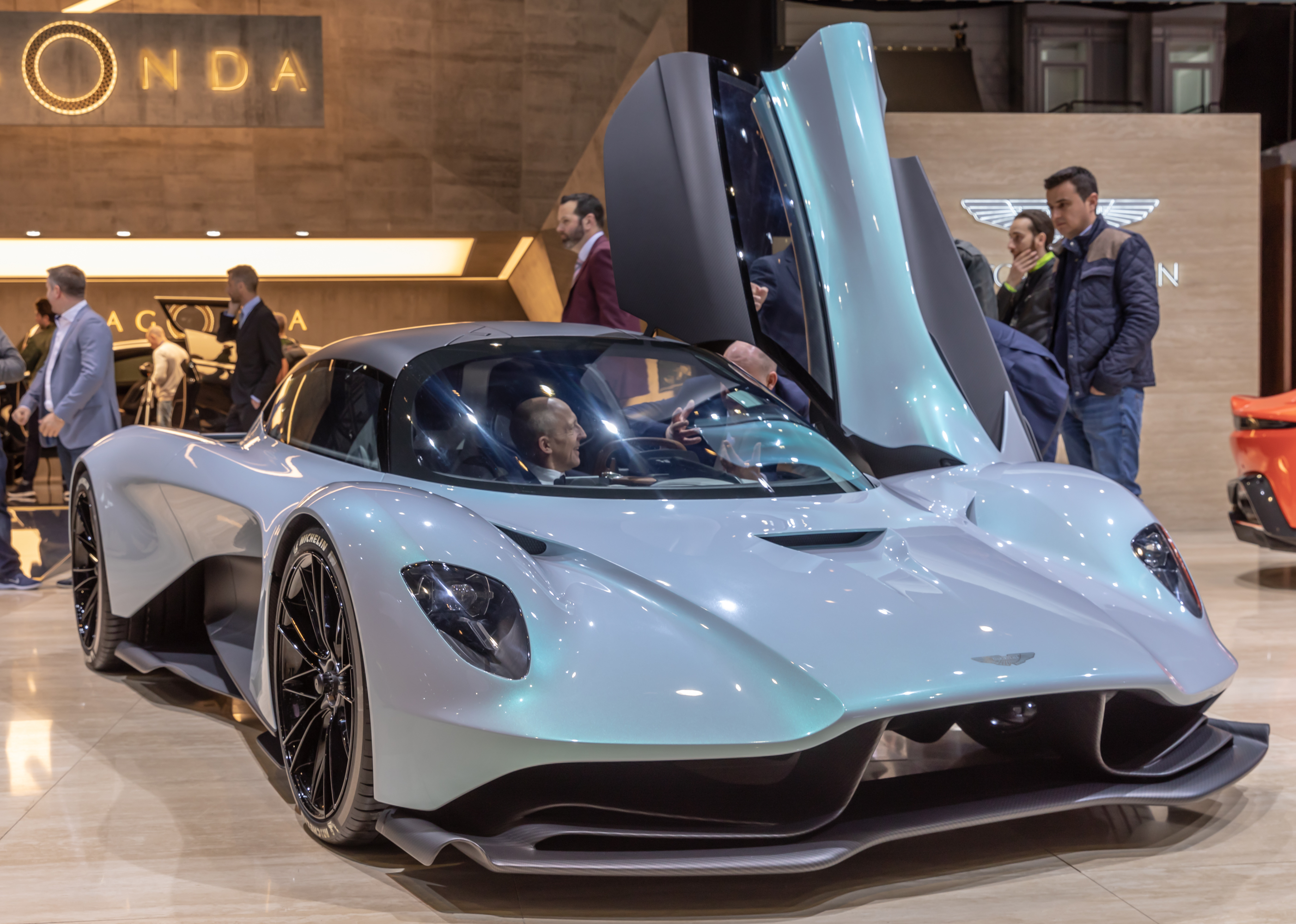
Aston Martin AM-RB 003

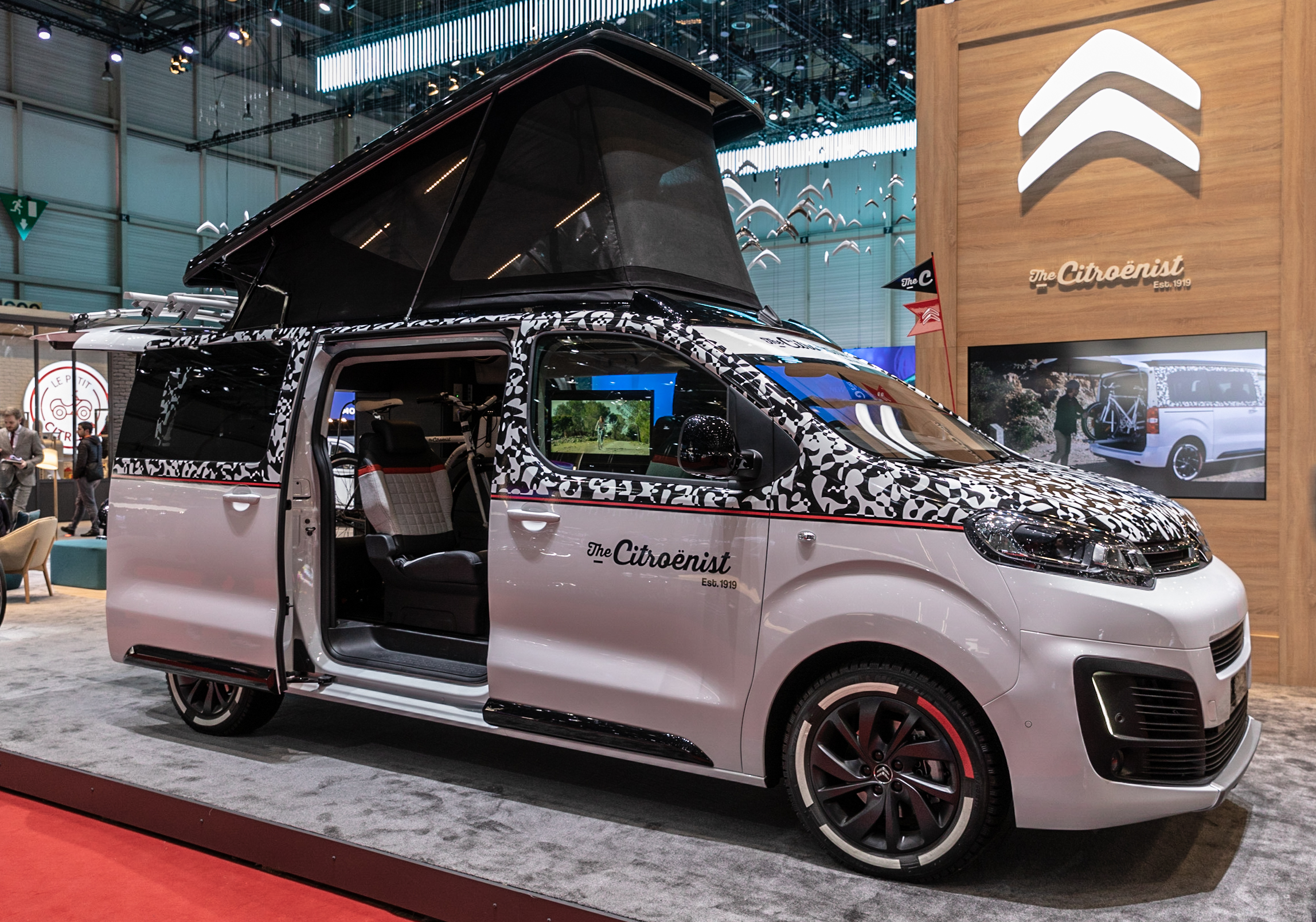
The Citroënist Concept

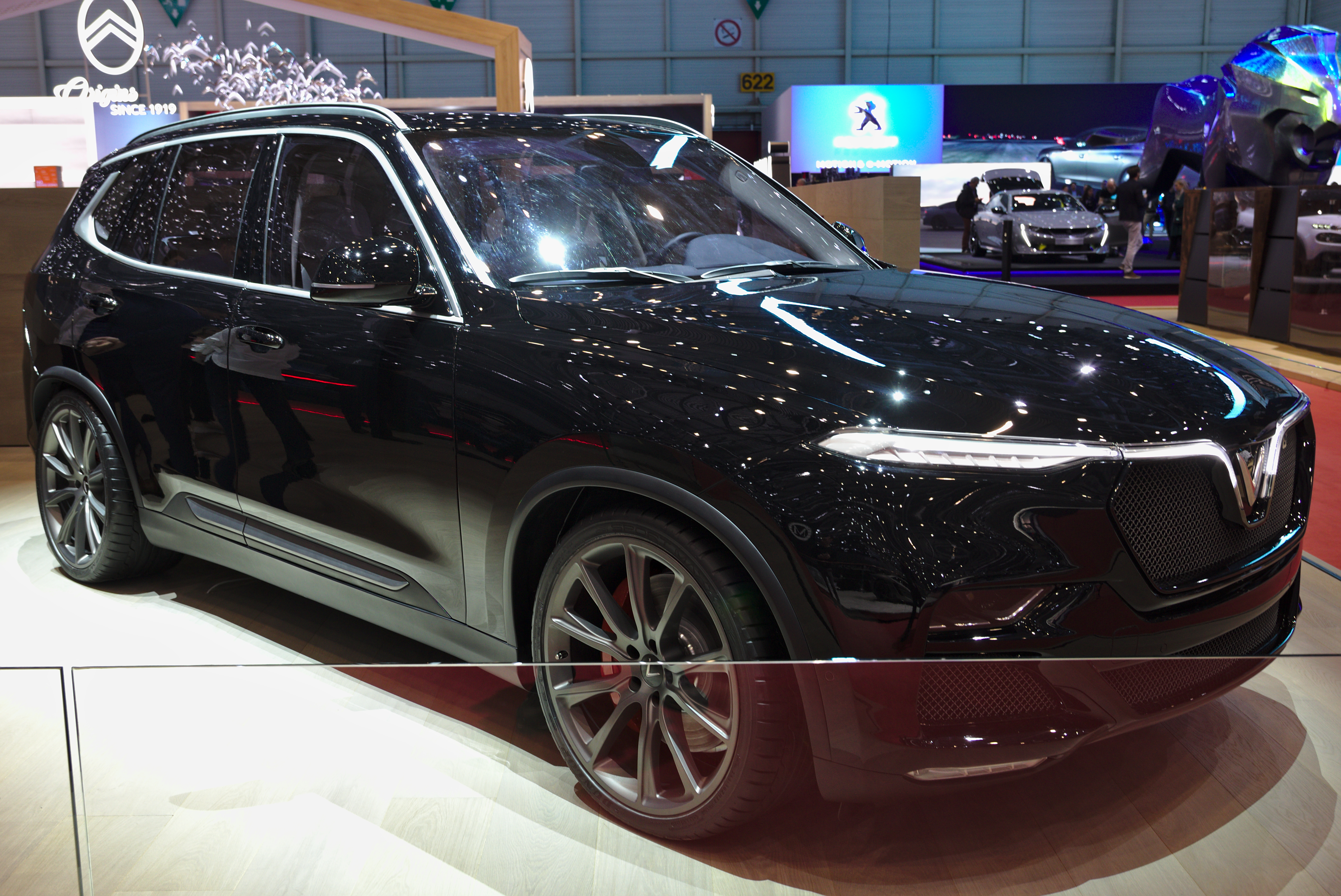
VinFast Lux V8 at Geneva Motor Show 2019

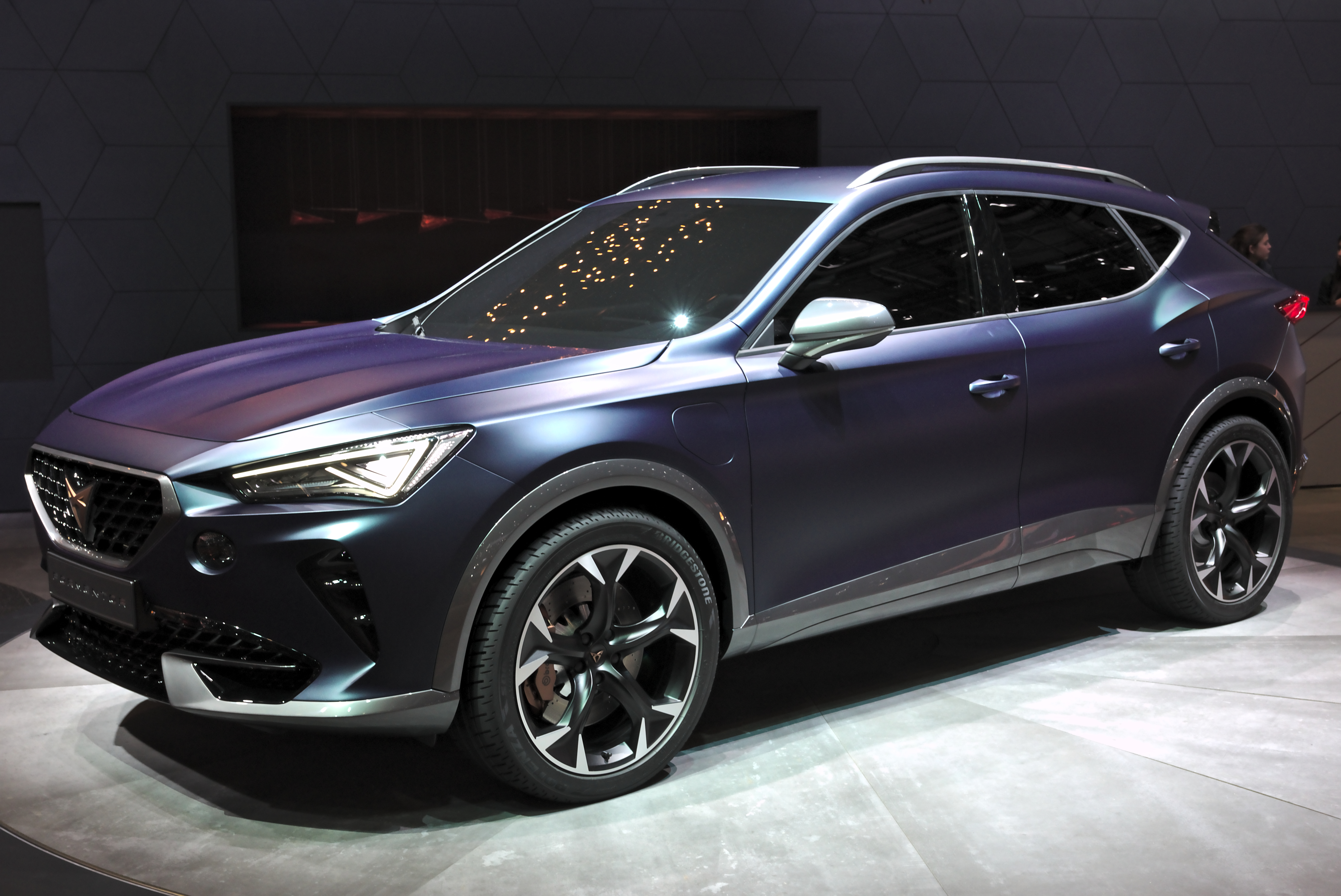
Cupra Formentor

- Alfa Romeo Tonale
- Aston Martin AM-RB 003
- Aston Martin Vanquish Vision Concept
- Aston Martin Lagonda All-Terrain
- Audi e-tron GT (European debut)
- Audi e-tron Sportback
- Audi Q4 e-tron
- BAIC Arcfox ECF
- BAIC Arcfox-GT
- Citroën Ami One Electric
- Citroën SpaceTourer "The Citroënist"
- Cupra Formentor
- e.GO Life Concept Sport
- Eadon Green Zanturi
- Engler F.F Superquad V10
- Fiat Centoventi EV
- GFG Style Kangaroo
- Gumpert Nathalie
- Hispano-Suiza Carmen EV
- Honda e Prototype
- Honda IED Tomo EV
- Italdesign DaVinci
- Kia 'Imagine by Kia' EV
- Lexus LC Convertible (European debut)
- Mercedes-Benz EQ Silver Arrow 01 Formula E Racecar
- Mercedes-Benz EQV
- Mitsubishi Engelberg Tourer
- Mole Costruzione Artigianale Almas
- Nissan IMQ
- Nissan Leaf Nismo RC (European debut)
- PAL-V Liberty Pioneer Edition
- Peugeot 508 Sport Engineered
- Peugeot e-Legend
- Piëch Mark Zero
- Renault EZ-Ultimo
- Rinspeed microSNAP
- SEAT el-Born
- SEAT Minimo
- Škoda Vision iV
- Smart Forease+
- Subaru Viziv Adrenaline
- Tata Motors H2X
- Toyota GR Supra GT4 Concept
- VinFast LUX V8 Limited Edition
- Volkswagen ID. Buggy
- Volkswagen T-Roc R

=== 2018 ===
The 88th Geneva Motor Show was held on 8 to 18 March 2018.

==== Production cars ====
- Abarth 124 GT
- Abarth 695 Rivale
- ABT Sportsline RS4-R Avant
- ABT Sportsline RS5-R
- Alfa Romeo 4C Competizione Coupe & Italia Spider
- Alfa Romeo Giulia Quadrifoglio Nurburgring Edition
- Alfa Romeo Giulia Veloce Ti
- Alfa Romeo Stelvio Quadrifoglio Nurburgring Edition
- Alpina XD3
- Alpina XD4
- Alpine A110 Pure & Légende
- Arden AJ23 (based on the Jaguar F-Type SVR Coupe)
- Arden Range Rover AR20
- Aston Martin DB11 Volante (European debut)
- Aston Martin V8 Vantage
- Aston Martin Racing V8 Vantage GTE
- Audi A6
- Audi A7 Sportback (European debut)
- Bentley Bentayga Hybrid
- Bentley Bentayga V8
- BMW 2 Series Active Tourer & Gran Tourer (European debut)
- BMW i8 Roadster (European debut)
- BMW M2 Black Shadow Edition
- BMW M3 CS (European debut)
- BMW X2 (European debut)
- BMW X4
- Brabus 800 based on MB E63S and S63 Coupe
- Bugatti Chiron Sport
- Citroën Berlingo
- Citroën C4 Cactus
- Cupra Ateca
- David Brown Automotive Mini Remastered
- David Brown Automotive Speedback GT Silverstone Edition
- Ferrari 488 Pista
- Ferrari Portofino
- Fiat 124 Spider S-Design
- Fiat 500X S-Design
- Fiat Tipo S-Design
- Ford Edge (facelift) (European debut)
- Ford Ka+
- Ford Mustang Bullitt (European debut)
- Hennessey Venom F5 (European debut)
- Honda Civic Type R TCR
- Hyundai Kona Electric
- Hyundai Nexo FCV (European debut)
- Hyundai Santa Fe
- Iconiq model SEVEN (European debut)
- Italdesign Zerouno Duerta
- Jaguar I-Pace
- Jeep Cherokee (European debut)
- Jeep Grand Cherokee Trackhawk (European debut)
- Jeep Wrangler (European debut)
- Kia Ceed Hatchback & Sportswagon
- Kia Optima EU-Spec. (facelift)
- Kia Rio GT-Line
- Koenigsegg Regera Ghost Package
- Lamborghini Huracán Performante Spyder
- Lamborghini Urus
- Lexus UX
- Manifattura Automobili Torino New Stratos
- Mansory Aston Martin DB11 Cyrus
- Mansory Bentley Bentayga Bleurion Edition
- Mansory Ferrari 812 Superfast Stallone
- Mansory McLaren 720S
- Mansory Rolls-Royce Phantom Bushukan Edition
- Maserati Ghibli, Quattroporte and Levante Nerissimo Edition (European debut)
- Mazda6 Sedan (European debut)
- Mazda6 Tourer
- McLaren Senna
- McLaren Senna Carbon Theme by MSO
- Mercedes-AMG C43 Sedan (facelift)
- Mercedes-AMG G63
- Mercedes-AMG GT 4-Door Coupé
- Mercedes-Benz A-Class (W177)
- Mercedes-Benz C-Class (facelift)
- Mercedes-Benz CLA Shooting Brake Night Edition
- Mercedes-Benz G-Class (European debut)
- Mercedes-Benz X-Class V6 4MATIC
- Mercedes-Maybach S-Class (facelift)
- Mitsubishi Outlander PHEV (facelift)
- Mini Cooper Hardtop & Cabrio (facelift) (European debut)
- Morgan Aero GT
- Morgan Plus 8 50th Anniversary Special Edition
- Pagani Zonda HP Barchetta (European debut)
- PAL-V Liberty Flying Car
- Peugeot 308 TCR
- Peugeot 508 Mk2
- Peugeot Rifter
- Pininfarina H2 Speed
- Polestar 1 (European debut)
- Porsche 911 Carrera T (European debut)
- Porsche 911 GT3 RS (facelift)
- Renault Zoe R110
- Rimac C Two
- Rolls-Royce Dawn 'Aero Cowling'
- Ruf SCR 2018
- Seat León Cupra R ST
- Sin Cars R1 550 Plug-in Hybrid
- Škoda Fabia (facelift)
- Škoda Kodiaq Laurin & Klement
- Škoda Octavia RS Challenge Plus
- SsangYong Musso
- TechArt GrandGT Supreme Sport Turismo
- Touring Superleggera Sciadipersia
- Toyota Auris
- Toyota Aygo (facelift)
- Volvo V60
- W Motors Fenyr SuperSport (European debut)
- Zenvo TSR-S

==== Concept cars ====
- Aston Martin Lagonda Vision Concept
- Aston Martin Valkyrie AMR Pro
- Audi e-tron SUV
- BMW M8 Gran Coupe
- Corbellati Missile
- Cupra e-Racer
- E'mobile Microlino
- E'mobile eRod Offroad Kybruz
- E'mobile Autonom Cab Navya
- Eadon Green Zeclat
- Formula E Gen2
- GFG Style Sybilla
- Honda Sports EV (European debut)
- Hyundai Le Fil Rouge
- IED Hyundai Kite
- Icona Nucleus
- Lamborghini Terzo Millennio
- Lexus LF-1 Limitless (European debut)
- LVCHI Venere
- Mazda Kai (European debut)
- Mazda Vision Coupe (European debut)
- McLaren Senna GTR
- Mitsubishi e-Evolution (European debut)
- Nissan Formula E concept livery
- Nissan IMx KURO (European debut)
- Peugeot Rifter 4x4
- Pininfarina HK GT
- Porsche Mission E Cross Turismo
- Range Rover SV Coupé
- Renault EZ-GO
- Rinspeed Snap
- Sbarro 4x4+2
- Sbarro GTC
- SsangYong e-SIV
- Škoda Vision X
- Subaru Viziv Tourer
- Tata H5X (European debut)
- Tata EVision
- Techrules Ren RS
- Toyota Fine-Comfort Ride (European debut)
- Toyota GR Supra Racing Concept
- Volkswagen I.D. Vizzion
- Zagato IsoRivolta Vision Gran Turismo

=== 2017 ===
The 87th Geneva Motor Show was held from 9 to 19 March 2017.

==== Production cars ====
- Abarth 595 Pista
- Alfa Romeo Stelvio (European debut)
- Alpina B3 S Bi-Turbo
- Alpina B4 S Bi-Turbo
- Alpina Alpina B5 Bi-Turbo (G30/G31)
- Alpine A110
- Aston Martin DB11 Q
- Aston Martin Valkyrie
- Aston Martin Vanquish S Volante
- Audi RS3 Sportback (facelift)
- Audi A5 Sportback g-tron
- Audi SQ5 (European debut)
- Audi RS5 Coupe
- Bentley Bentayga Mulliner
- Bentley Continental Supersports (European debut)
- Bentley Mulsanne Hallmark Series by Mulliner
- Bentley Flying Spur W12 S
- BMW 4 Series (facelift)
- BMW 5 Series Touring
- Brabus 550 Adventure 4x4^{2}
- Brabus 650 Cabrio
- Dacia Logan MCV Stepway
- David Brown Automotives Speedback GT
- DS 7 Crossback
- Ferrari 812 Superfast
- Fiat 124 Spider Europa
- Fiat 500 Sessantesimo Limited Edition
- Fiat Fullback Cross
- Ford Fiesta
- Ford Fiesta ST
- Ford GT 66 Heritage
- Gemballa Avalanche
- Honda Civic Type R
- Hyundai i30 Wagon
- Infiniti Q50 (facelift)
- Italdesign Zerouno
- Jeep Compass (European debut)
- Kahn Vengeance Volante
- Kia Picanto
- Kia Stinger (European debut)
- Koenigsegg Agera RS Gryphon
- Lamborghini Aventador S
- Lamborghini Huracán Performante
- Land Rover Range Rover Velar
- Lexus LS 500h
- Maserati GranTurismo Sport Special Edition
- Mazda CX-5 (European debut)
- Mazda MX-5 RF (European debut)
- McLaren 720S
- Mercedes-Benz E-Class Cabriolet
- Mercedes-Benz E-Class Coupe
- Mercedes-AMG E63 S Estate
- Mercedes-AMG GT C Roadster Edition 50
- Mercedes-Maybach G650 Landaulet
- Mercedes-Benz GLA (refresh) (European debut)
- Mitsubishi Eclipse Cross
- Nissan Qashqai (facelift)
- Noble M600 Speedster
- Opel Insignia Grand Sport
- Opel Insignia Sports Tourer
- Opel Crossland X
- Pagani Huayra Roadster
- Porsche Panamera Sports Turismo
- Porsche Panamera Turbo S E-Hybrid
- Porsche 911 GT3 (facelift)
- Porsche 911 Carrera 4 GTS
- Porsche 911 Targa 4 GTS
- Porsche 911 R by Tag Heuer
- Renault Alaskan (European debut)
- Renault Captur (facelift)
- Renault Koleos II (European debut)
- Rimac Concept One
- Rolls-Royce Ghost Elegance
- Ruf CTR Anniversary
- Scuderia Cameron Glickenhaus SCG 003
- SEAT Ibiza
- SEAT León Cupra (facelift)
- Škoda Citigo (facelift)
- Sin Cars R1 550
- Škoda Rapid (facelift)
- Škoda Octavia RS 245
- Škoda Kodiaq Sportline and Scout
- Smart Forfour crosstown edition
- Smart Fortwo cabrio Brabus edition No. 2
- Spyker C8 Preliator Spyder
- Subaru XV / Crosstrek
- Suzuki Swift
- TechArt Magnum Sport
- TechArt GrandGT
- TechArt GTStreet R Cabriolet
- Toyota Yaris (second facelift)
- Toyota Yaris GRMN
- Volkswagen Arteon
- Volkswagen Golf R (facelift)
- Volkswagen Tiguan Allspace
- Volvo XC60
- Zenvo TS1 GT

==== Concept cars ====
- Artega Scalo Superelletra
- Aston Martin Rapide AMR
- Aston Martin Vantage AMR Pro
- Audi Q8 Sport
- Bentley EXP 12 Speed 6e
- Cadillac Escala (European debut)
- Chevrolet Camaro Track concept
- Citroën C-Aircross
- Eadon Green Black Cuillin
- Honda NeuV (European debut)
- Hyundai FE Fuel Cell
- Infiniti Q60 Project Black S
- Italdesign AirBus PopUp Flying Car
- Jaguar I-Pace (European debut)
- Land Rover Discovery Project Hero
- Mercedes-AMG GT Concept
- Mercedes-Benz Concept X-Class
- Nissan BladeGlider (European debut)
- Peugeot Instinct
- Pininfarina Fittipaldi EF7 Vision GT
- Pininfarina H600
- Quant 48Volt
- Renault Trezor
- Renault Zoe E-Sport
- Rinspeed Oasis
- Sbarro Mojave
- SsangYong XAVL
- Tata Tamo Racemo
- Techrules Ren
- Toyota i-TRIL
- Vanda Dendrobium
- Volkswagen I.D. Buzz (European debut)
- Volkswagen Sedric

=== 2016 ===
The 86th Geneva Motor Show was held from 3 to 13 March 2016.

==== Production cars ====
- Abarth 124 Spider
- Alfa Romeo Giulia
- Alpina B7 (G12)
- Apollo N
- Arash AF8 Cassini
- Arash AF10
- Aston Martin DB11
- Audi Q2
- Audi S4 Avant
- Bentley Flying Spur V8 S
- Bentley Mulsanne
- Bentley Mulsanne Grand Limousine Mulliner
- BMW Alpina B7 xDrive
- BMW M760Li xDrive
- BMW M2 Coupé M Performance Package
- Brabus 900 Rocket Coupe
- Bugatti Chiron
- Chevrolet Camaro (sixth generation) (European debut)
- Chevrolet Corvette Grand Sport
- Citroën SpaceTourer
- Dodge Viper ACR (European debut)
- Ferrari California T Handling Speciale
- Ferrari GTC4Lusso
- Fiat Tipo
- Ford Fiesta ST200
- Ford Kuga (refresh)
- Honda Clarity Fuel Cell (European debut)
- Genesis G90 (European debut)
- Hyundai Ioniq electric drive line-up
- Infiniti Q50 (refresh) (European debut)
- Infiniti Q60 (European debut)
- Infiniti QX30 (European debut)
- Jaguar F-Type SVR
- Kahn Vengeance
- Kia Niro (European debut)
- Kia Optima Sportswagon
- Koenigsegg Agera Final Edition One of 1
- Koenigsegg Regera
- Lamborghini Centenario
- Lamborghini Huracán LP610-4 Avio
- Land Rover Range Rover Evoque Convertible
- Lexus LC 500h
- Lotus 3-Eleven
- Lotus Elise Cup 250
- Lotus Evora Sport 410
- Maserati Levante
- McLaren 570GT
- McLaren 675LT Spider by MSO
- McLaren P1 by MSO
- Mercedes-AMG SLC43 (European debut)
- Mercedes-Benz C-Class Cabriolet, Mercedes-AMG C43 Cabriolet
- Morgan EV3
- Opel Mokka X
- Pagani Huayra BC
- Peugeot Traveller
- Porsche 718 Boxster
- Porsche 911 R
- Radical RXC Turbo 500R
- Renault Scénic
- Renault Talisman
- Rimac Concept One
- Rolls-Royce Ghost Black Badge
- Rolls-Royce Wraith Black Badge
- Secma F16 Turbo
- SEAT Ateca
- Spyker C8 Preliator
- Sin Cars R1
- Suzuki SX4 Cross (facelift)
- Tesla Model X (European debut)
- Toyota C-HR
- Toyota ProAce Verso
- Volkswagen Phideon
- Volvo V40 (refresh)
- Volvo V90
- Volvo XC90 Excellence (European debut)
- W Motors Lykan HyperSport
- Zenvo TS1

==== Concept cars ====
- AC Schnitzer ACL2
- Alpine Vision
- Apollo Arrow
- Citroën SpaceTourer Hyphen
- DS E-Tense
- Honda Civic Hatchback Prototype
- Italdesign GTZero
- Lexus LF-FC (European debut)
- Mazda RX-Vision
- Mitsubishi ASX Geoseek
- Mitsubishi L200 Geoseek
- Nissan Qashqai Premium
- Nissan X-Trail Premium
- Opel GT Concept
- Pininfarina H2 Speed
- Rimac Concept S
- Rinspeed Ʃtos
- Sbarro Ginevra
- Sbarro Haze
- Škoda Vision S
- SsangYong SIV-2
- Techrules AT96 TREV
- Carrozzeria Touring Superleggera Disco Volante Spyder
- Volkswagen T-Cross Breeze

=== 2015 ===
The 85th Geneva Motor Show was held from 5 to 15 March 2015.

==== Production cars ====
- Alfa Romeo 4C Spider
- Alpina B6 Edition 50
- Aston Martin Lagonda Taraf
- Aston Martin Vantage GT3
- Aston Martin Vulcan
- Audi Q7
- Audi R8
- Bentley Continental GT Speed (facelift)
- BMW 1 Series (facelift)
- BMW 2 Series Gran Tourer
- Bugatti Veyron Grand Sport Vitesse La Finale
- Cadillac ATS-V Coupe (European debut)
- Cadillac CTS-V (European debut)
- Citroën Berlingo Multispace
- Ferrari 488 GTB
- Fiat 500 Vintage '57
- Ford Focus RS
- Ford GT
- GTA Spano
- Honda Civic Type R
- Honda Jazz (European debut)
- Honda HR-V (European debut)
- Honda NSX
- Hyundai i20 Coupe
- Hyundai i30 (facelift)
- Hyundai i40 (facelift)
- Hyundai Tucson
- Koenigsegg Agera RS
- Koenigsegg Regera
- Lamborghini Aventador LP 750-4 Superveloce
- Land Rover Range Rover Evoque (facelift)
- Lexus GS F (European debut)
- Lotus Evora 400
- Mazda6 (facelift)
- Mazda CX-3 (European debut)
- Mazda CX-5 (facelift)
- McLaren 675LT
- McLaren P1 GTR
- Mercedes-AMG GT3
- Mercedes-Benz G500 4×4^{2}
- Mercedes-Maybach S600 Pullman
- Mitsubishi Triton (L200)
- Morgan Aero8
- Opel Karl (Vauxhall Viva)
- Opel Corsa OPC
- Peugeot 208 (facelift)
- Pininfarina Ferrari Sergio
- Porsche 918 Spyder
- Porsche 911 GT3 RS
- Porsche Cayman GT4
- Quant F
- Radical RXC Turbo 500
- Renault Kadjar
- Rolls-Royce Phantom Serenity
- Ruf Turbo Florio
- SEAT León ST Cupra 280
- Skoda Superb
- Subaru Levorg
- SsangYong Tivoli
- Toyota Auris (facelift)
- Toyota Avensis (2nd facelift)
- Touring Superleggera Berlinetta Lusso
- Volkswagen Sharan MK2 (facelift)
- Volkswagen Touran MK3
- Volkswagen Passat Alltrack
- Volvo S60 Cross Country

==== Concept cars ====
- Aston Martin DBX
- Audi Prologue Avant
- Bentley EXP 10 Speed 6
- Citroën Berlingo Mountain Vibe Concept
- Infiniti QX30
- Italdesign Giugiaro Gea
- Kia Sportspace
- Lexus LF-SA
- Magna Steyr Mila Plus Hybrid
- Nissan Sway
- Peugeot Quartz
- Quantino
- SEAT 20V20
- Suzuki iM-4
- Volkswagen Sport Coupe Concept GTE

=== 2014 ===
The 84th Geneva Motor Show was held from 6 to 16 March 2014.

==== Production cars ====
- Abarth 695 Biposto
- Abt Audi RS6-R Avant
- Alpina B4 Biturbo Cabriolet
- Aston Martin V8 Vantage N430
- Audi S1
- Audi S3 Cabriolet
- Audi TT
- Bentley Flying Spur V8
- BMW 2 Series Active Tourer
- BMW 4 Series Gran Coupé
- BMW M4 Coupe
- BMW X4
- Brabus B63S-700 6x6
- Bugatti Veyron Rembrandt
- Citroën C1
- Citroën C4 Cactus
- Ferrari California T
- Fiat Freemont Cross
- Fiat Panda Cross
- Ford Focus (facelift)
- Jaguar XFR-S Sportbrake
- Jeep Renegade
- Koenigsegg One:1
- Lamborghini Huracán LP610-4
- Lexus RC F Sport
- Maserati Quattroporte Ermenegildo Zegna Limited Edition
- McLaren 650S
- Mercedes-Benz S-Class Coupé
- Mercedes-Benz V-Class
- Nissan e-NV200
- Nissan GT-R NISMO (European début)
- Nissan Juke
- Opel Adam Rocks
- Opel Astra OPC Extreme
- Pagani Zonda Revolucion
- Peugeot 108
- Peugeot 308 SW
- Porsche 911 RSR Racecar
- Porsche 919 Hybrid LMP1
- Qoros 3 Hatch
- Renault Twingo
- Rolls-Royce Ghost Series II
- Toyota Aygo
- Volkswagen Golf GTE (plug-in hybrid)
- Volkswagen Polo (facelift)
- Volkswagen Scirocco (facelift)
- Zenvo ST1

==== Concept cars ====
- Alfa Romeo 4C Spider
- Audi TT Quattro Sport
- Honda Civic Type R
- Hyundai Intrado
- IED Hyundai PassoCorto
- Infiniti Q50 Eau Rouge
- Italdesign Giugiaro Clipper
- Maserati Alfieri
- Mazda Hazumi
- Mini Clubman Concept
- Quant E
- Rinspeed XchangE
- Škoda VisionC
- SsangYong XLV
- Subaru Viziv 2
- Volkswagen Multivan Alltrack
- Volkswagen T-Roc
- Volvo Concept Estate

=== 2013 ===
The 83rd Geneva Motor Show was held from 7 to 17 March 2013.

==== Production cars ====
- Alfa Romeo 4C
- Alfa Romeo MiTo SBK
- Aston Martin Rapide S
- Aston Martin Vanquish
- Audi A3 Sportback G-tron
- Audi RS Q3
- Audi RS5 Coupe DTM
- Audi RS6 Avant
- Audi RS7 Sportback
- Audi S3 Sportback
- Bentley Flying Spur
- BMW 3 Series Gran Turismo
- Brabus 800 Roadster
- Brabus PI 800 Widestar
- Brabus CLS B63 S 730
- Brabus CLS Shooting Brake B63 S 730
- Brabus B63-620 Widestar
- Cadillac ATS (European introduction)
- Chevrolet Captiva (2nd facelift)
- Chevrolet Corvette Stingray Convertible
- Chevrolet Spark EV
- Citroën C3 (facelift)
- Citroën DS4 "Electro Shot"
- Dacia Logan MCV
- Exagon Furtive e-GT
- LaFerrari
- Fiat 500e
- Fiat 500L Trekking
- Ford EcoSport (European introduction)
- Ford Tourneo Courier
- Ford Tourneo Custom
- Ford Tourneo Connect
- Gemballa MP4-12C Spider
- Gumpert Apollo S
- GTA Spano
- Hyundai Grand Santa Fe
- Hyundai ix35 (facelift)
- Infiniti Q50
- Jeep Compass (facelift, European introduction)
- Jeep Grand Cherokee
- Jeep Wrangler Rubicon
- Kia cee'd GT
- Kia pro cee'd GT
- Lamborghini Veneno
- Lexus IS
- Maserati Quattroporte
- McLaren P1
- Mercedes-Benz A 45 AMG
- Mercedes-Benz CLA (European introduction)
- Mercedes-Benz E-Class (facelift)
- Mini Paceman John Cooper Works
- Nissan Note
- Opel Cascada
- Peugeot 208 GTi
- Peugeot 2008
- Porsche 918
- Porsche 911 GT3 (Type 991)
- Porsche Cayman
- Qoros 3 Sedan
- Renault Captur
- Renault Scénic and Grand Scénic (2nd facelift)
- Renault Scénic XMOD
- Renault Kangoo Express
- Renault Kangoo Maxi Z.E.
- Rolls-Royce Wraith
- Ruf CTR3 Clubsport
- Seat León III SC
- Škoda Octavia III
- SsangYong Rodius
- Suzuki SX4
- Toyota RAV4
- Toyota Auris Touring Sports
- Volkswagen Cross up!
- Volkswagen Golf VII GTI and GTD
- Volkswagen Golf VII Variant BlueMotion
- Volkswagen XL1
- Volvo S60/V60
- Volvo XC60
- Volvo S80/V70/XC70
- Volvo V60 D6 Plug-In Hybrid
- Wiesmann GT MF4-CS

==== Concept cars ====
- Alfa Romeo Gloria
- Aston Martin Rapide Bertone Jet 2+2
- Audi A3 e-tron
- Belumbury Lallo Concept
- Belumbury Dany Concept
- Citroën C3 Hybrid Air Concept
- Citroën Technospace
- Fiat 500 "GQ" Showcar
- Fornasari Hunter
- Fornasari Gigi
- Honda Civic Tourer Concept
- Hyundai i20 WRC Prototype
- IMA Colibri
- Italdesign Giugiaro Parcour and Roadster
- Kia Provo Concept
- Koenigsegg Agera S "Hundra"
- Land Rover Electric Defender Research Vehicle
- Mitsubishi CA-MiEV
- Mitsubishi GR-HEV
- Opel Adam Rocks
- Opel Adam R2 Rally Car Concept
- Peugeot RCZ View Top Concept by Magna Steyr
- Pininfarina Sergio
- Qoros 3 Cross Hybrid Concept
- Qoros 3 Estate Concept
- Rinspeed microMAX
- Sbarro React'E.V. Concept
- Spyker B6 Venator
- SsangYong SIV-1 Concept
- Subaru Viziv
- Toyota Auris Touring Sports Black Concept
- Toyota FT-86 Open
- Toyota i-Road
- Toyota RAV4 Adventure Concept
- Toyota RAV4 Premium Concept
- Valmet Eva Range Extender Concept
- Volkswagen e-Co-Motion Concept
- Volkswagen Golf Variant Concept R-Line

=== 2012 ===
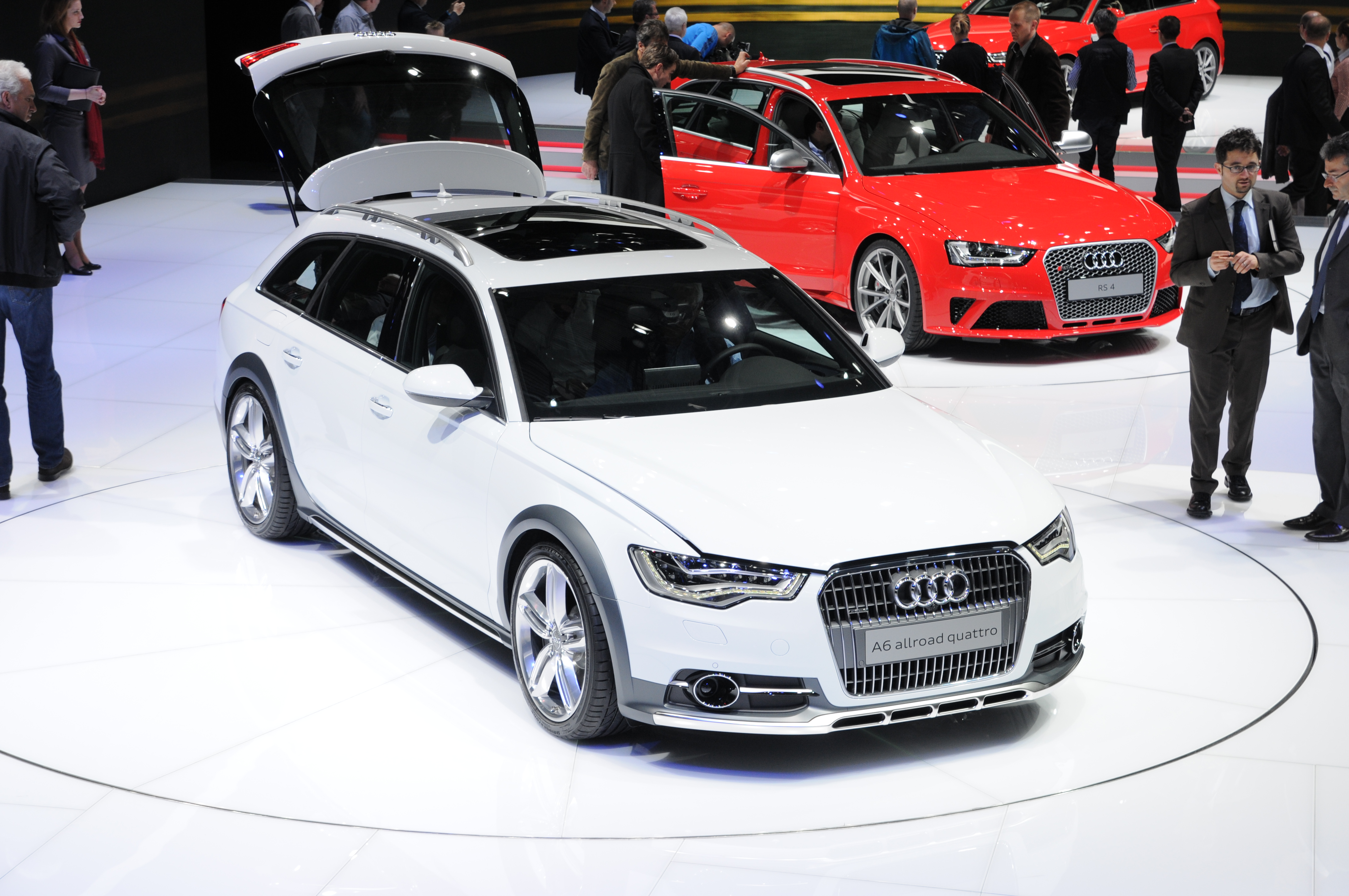
Two Audis presented at the 2012 Geneva Motor Show, the A6 allroad quattro and the RS4 Avant

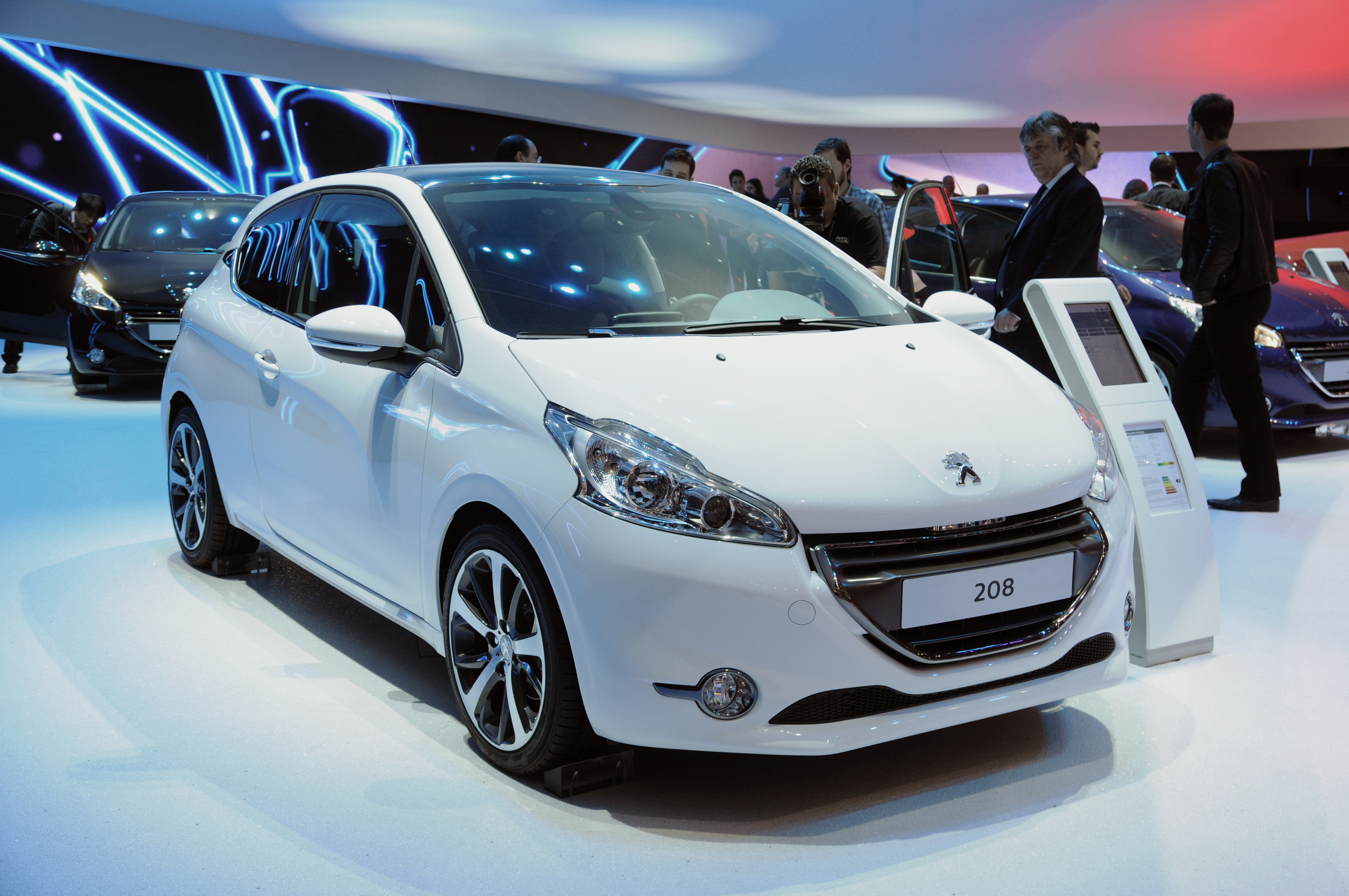
Peugeot 208 at Geneva 2012

The 82nd edition was held from 8 to 18 March 2012.

==== Production cars ====
- Abarth 695 Tributo Maserati Convertible
- Alpina B5 (F10) (facelift)
- Artega GT Roadster
- Aston Martin V8 Vantage (facelift)
- Aston Martin V12 Zagato
- Audi A1 Quattro
- Audi A3
- Audi A4 (facelift)
- Audi RS4 Avant
- Audi A6 allroad quattro
- Audi TT RS Plus
- Audi SQ3
- Bentley Continental GT V8
- Bentley Mulsanne Mulliner Driving Specification
- Alpina B5 Biturbo (F10)
- BMW 5 Series (F10) M550d
- BMW M6 CC
- BMW 6 Series (F06) Gran Coupé
- Brabus Bullit Coupe 800
- Bugatti Veyron Grand Sport Vitesse
- Chevrolet Cruze SW
- Citroën C1 (2nd facelift)
- Citroën C4 Aircross
- Dacia Lodgy
- Ferrari California (facelift)
- Ferrari F12 Berlinetta
- Fiat 500L
- Ford B-MAX
- Ford F-Series Super Duty
- Ford Fiesta ST
- Ford Kuga
- Gumpert Apollo R
- Honda Civic D
- Honda CR-V (European introduction)
- Hyundai i20 (facelift)
- Hyundai i30 CrossWagon
- Isuzu D-MAX
- Jaguar XF Sportbrake
- Kia cee'd and SW
- Kia K9
- Lancia Flavia Cabrio
- Lexus GS F-Sport
- Lexus RX 450h
- Maserati GranTurismo Sport
- Mercedes-Benz A-Class
- Mercedes-Benz SL-Class
- Mini Countryman John Cooper Works
- Mitsubishi Outlander
- Morgan Plus 8
- Nissan Juke Nismo
- Opel Astra OPC
- Opel Insignia Cross Four
- Opel Mokka
- Peugeot 107 (2nd facelift)
- Peugeot 208
- Peugeot 4008
- Porsche Boxster (Type 981)
- Renault Mégane (facelift)
- Renault Scénic & Renault Grand Scénic (facelift)
- Renault Zoe
- Rolls-Royce Phantom (facelift)
- Ruf RGT-8
- SEAT Mii
- Škoda Citigo
- Smart electric drive and Smart Brabus electric drive
- Smart fortwo (facelift)
- Ssangyong Korando
- Subaru Impreza
- Subaru BRZ
- Toyota Aygo (2nd facelift)
- Toyota GT 86
- Toyota Prius
- Toyota Yaris Hybrid
- Volkswagen up! 5-door
- Volkswagen Polo BlueGT
- Volkswagen Golf Cabriolet GTI
- Volkswagen Passat Alltrack
- Volvo V40

==== Concept cars ====
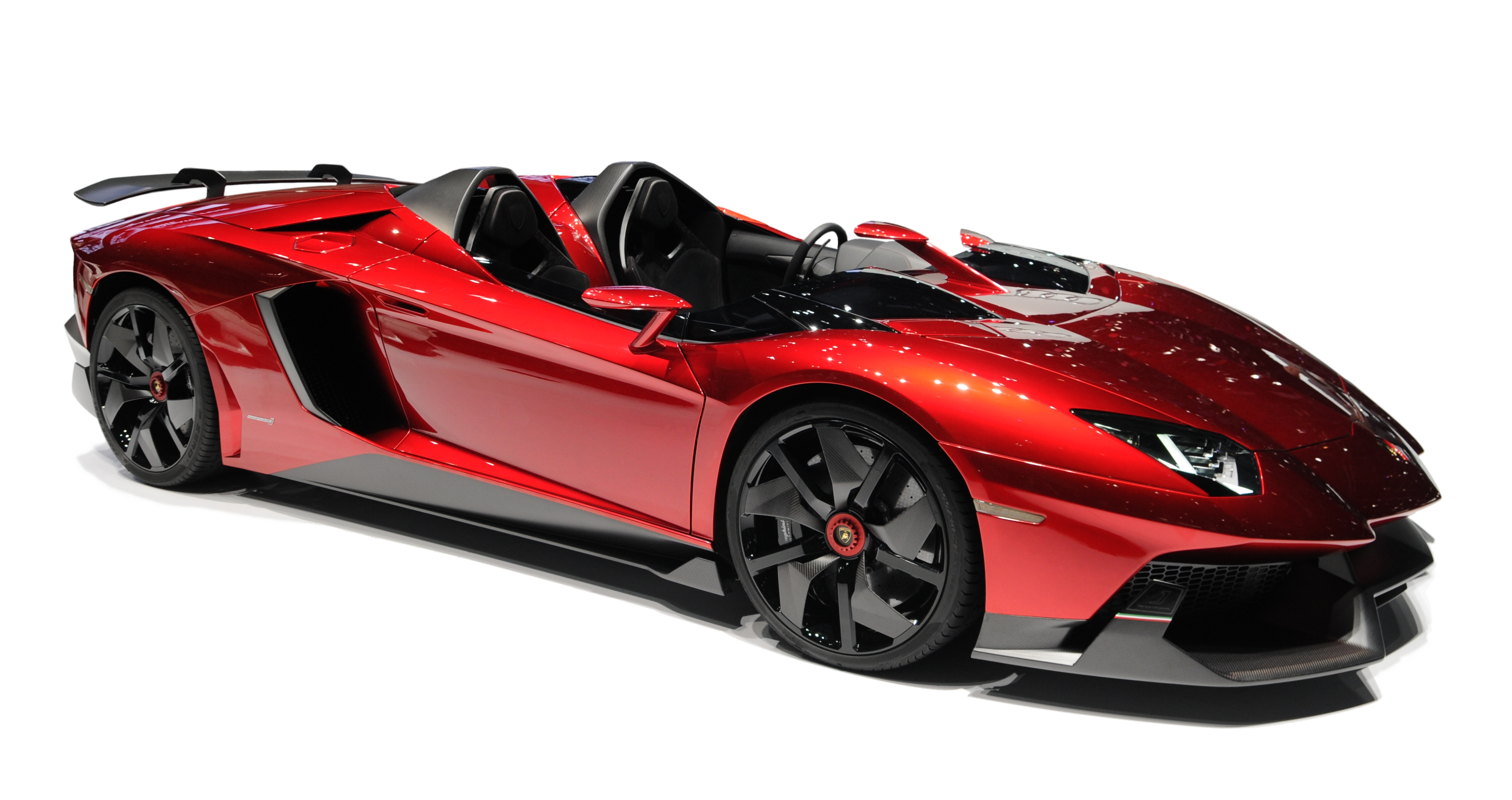
Lamborghini Aventador J concept

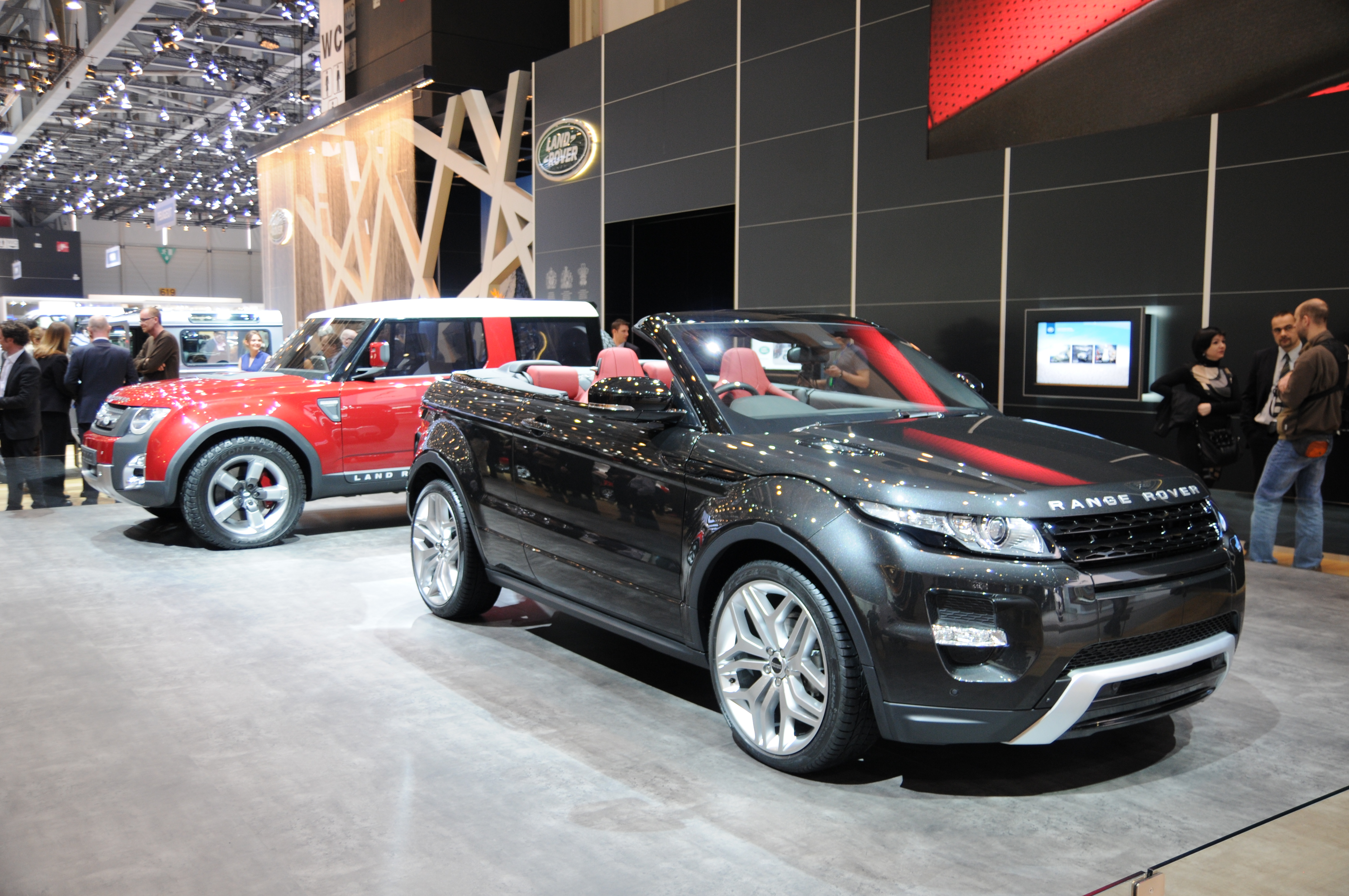
The Range Rover Evoque Convertible Concept

- AC 378 GT Zagato
- Bentley EXP 9 F
- Bertone Nuccio Concept
- BMW M135i
- Carrozzeria Touring Superleggera Disco Volante
- Citroën DS4 Racing
- Ford Tourneo
- Giugiaro Brivido
- Honda NSX
- Hyundai i-oniq
- Infiniti Emerg-e
- Jeep Compass
- Jeep Grand Cherokee Sport
- Lamborghini Aventador J
- Lyonheart K
- Magna Steyr MILA Coupic
- Mazda Takeri
- Mini Clubvan
- Mitsubishi i-MiEV Prototype (Pikes Peak)
- Nissan Hi-Cross
- Nissan Invitation
- Peugeot 208 GTi and XY
- Pininfarina Cambiano
- Range Rover Evoque Convertible Concept
- Rinspeed Dock+Go
- SEAT Toledo Concept
- SsangYong XIV-2
- Suzuki Swift Range Extender
- Tata Megapixel
- Tesla Model S
- Tesla Model X
- Toyota FT-Bh
- Volkswagen Amarok Canyon
- Volkswagen Cargo up!, Swiss up!, X up!, and Winter up!
- Volkswagen Cross Coupé TDI Hybrid

=== 2011 ===
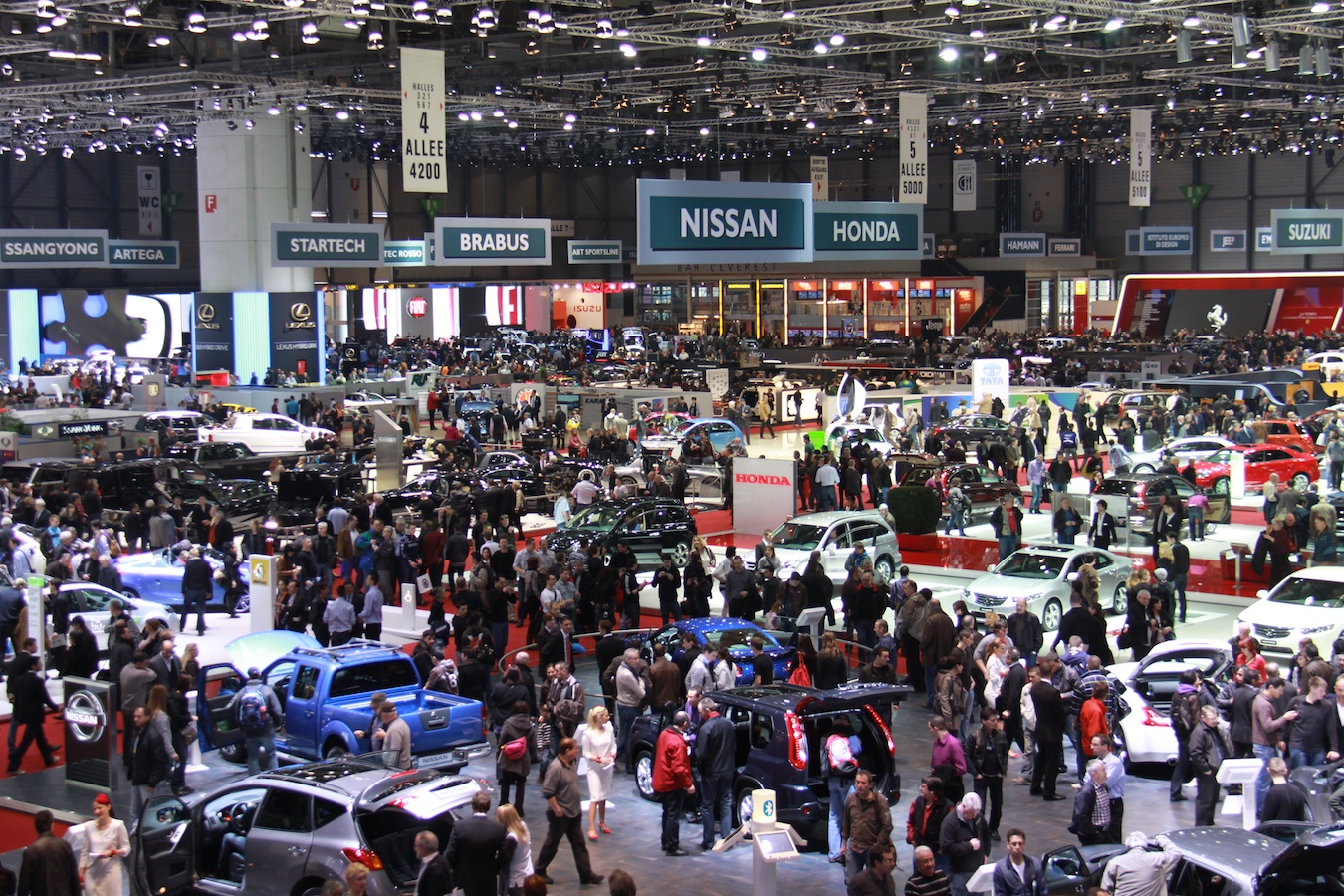
Geneva Motor Show March 2011

The 2011 edition was held from 3 to 13 March 2011.

==== Production cars ====
- AC Cars MkVI
- Aston Martin Cygnet
- Aston Martin Virage
- Aston Martin V8 Vantage S
- Audi RS3 Sportback
- Audi Q5 Hybrid
- Bentley Continental Supersports Ice Speed Edition
- Bentley Flying Spur Series 51
- BMW ActiveE
- BMW 320d EfficientDynamics Touring Edition
- BMW X1 xDrive28i (turbo I4)
- Chevrolet Camaro ZL1 (European début)
- Chevrolet Cruze Hatchback (final production version)
- Citroën DS4
- Ferrari FF
- Fiat 500 Gucci
- Fiat Freemont
- Ford C-Max Hybrid (European debut)
- Ford C-Max Energi plug-in hybrid (European debut)
- Ford Focus Electric (European debut)
- Ford Metal Ka
- Ford Ranger Wildtrak
- GTA Spano
- Honda Accord (facelift)
- Hyundai i40
- Jaguar XKR-S
- Jeep Grand Cherokee (European début)
- Kia Picanto
- Kia Rio
- Koenigsegg Agera R
- Lamborghini Aventador LP700-4
- Lancia Grand Voyager
- Lancia Thema
- Lancia Ypsilon
- Lexus LFA Nürburgring Package
- Maserati Gran Cabrio Sport
- Mercedes-Benz C-Class Coupe
- Mercedes-Benz SLK
- Morgan ThreeWheeler
- Opel Ampera
- Opel Antara (facelift)
- Opel Corsa (facelift)
- Pagani Huayra
- Peugeot 308 (facelift)
- Peugeot 3008 hybride HDi
- Porsche Panamera S Hybrid
- Saab 9-5 SportCombi
- Ssangyong Korando
- Subaru Trezia
- Suzuki Swift Sport
- Toyota Prius+
- Toyota Yaris HSD Hybrid
- Volkswagen Golf Cabriolet
- Volkswagen Tiguan facelift

==== Concept cars ====
- Alfa Romeo 4C
- Audi A3 Sedan Concept
- BMW Vision ConnectedDrive
- Cadillac Urban Luxury
- Citroën Metropolis
- De Tomaso Deauville
- Fiat 500 Coupé Zagato
- Ford B-MAX
- Ford Vertrek (European debut)
- Fornasari RR99
- Gumpert Tornante
- Honda EV
- Infiniti Etherea
- Jaguar B99 by Bertone
- Lancia Flavia/Flavia Cabrio concepts
- Land Rover Range_e
- Magna Steyr MILA Aerolight
- Mazda Minagi
- Mini Rocketman
- Mitsubishi Concept Global Small
- Nissan Esflow
- Opel Zafira Tourer Concept
- Renault Captur
- Rinspeed BamBoo
- Rolls-Royce 102EX (Phantom Experimental Electric)
- Saab PhoeniX
- Skoda Vision D
- Smart Forspeed
- Tata Pixel
- Toyota FT-86 II
- Toyota iQ EV (pre-production)
- Volkswagen Bulli
- Volvo V60 Plug-in Hybrid (pre-production)

=== 2010 ===
The 80th edition of the Geneva Motor Show was held from 4–14 March 2010. Over 80 introductions were expected for the show. Press days for the show started on 2 March 2010, when most of the major introductions occurred.

==== Production cars ====
- Alfa Romeo Giulietta
- Alpina B3 S
- Audi A1
- Audi RS5
- Bentley Continental Supersports Convertible
- BMW 5 Series (F10)
- Carlsson C25
- Dacia Duster
- Ford C-Max / Grand C-Max (production versions)
- Ford Focus (European debut)
- Garia LSV (Low Speed Vehicle)
- Infiniti M35 Hybrid
- Jaguar XKR Special Edition
- Kia Sportage
- Koenigsegg Agera
- Lamborghini Gallardo LP570-4 Superleggera
- Lexus CT 200h
- Lotus Elise
- Lotus Evora Cup
- Mazda 6
- Mazda 5
- Mini Countryman
- Mitsubishi ASX
- Nissan 370Z Roadster (European début)
- Nissan Global Compact Car
- Nissan Juke
- Nissan Navara
- Nissan Pathfinder
- Nissan Qashqai
- Opel Meriva
- Pagani Zonda Tricolore
- Porsche 911 Turbo S
- Porsche Cayenne
- Renault Mégane Convertible
- Renault Wind
- Rolls-Royce Ghost by Mansory
- Ruf RGT-8
- SEAT Ibiza ST
- Volkswagen CrossPolo
- Volkswagen Polo BlueMotion
- Volkswagen Polo GTI
- Volkswagen Sharan
- Volkswagen Touareg
- Volvo S60

==== Concept cars ====
- Alfa Romeo 2uettottanta by Pininfarina
- Aston Martin Cygnet
- Audi A1 E-Tron
- Bertone Alfa Romeo Pandion
- BMW Concept 5 Series ActiveHybrid
- BMW Concept ActiveE (European début)
- Bufori Geneva
- Bugatti 16C Galibier
- Chevrolet Aveo RS (European début)
- Citroën DS High Rider
- DOK-ING XD
- Ferrari 599 GTB HY-KERS Hybrid
- GQ by Citroën
- Honda 3R-C
- Hispano-Suiza V10 Supercharged
- Hyundai i-flow diesel-electric hybrid
- I.DE.A Institute Sofia
- KSU Gazal-1
- Lotus Evora 414E Hybrid
- Mitsubishi Concept cX
- Mercedes-Benz F800
- Opel Flextreme GT/E
- Peugeot SR1
- 5 by Peugeot
- Porsche 918 Spyder Plug-in Hybrid
- Proton Concept Car by Italdesign Giugiaro
- Rinspeed UC (electric micro vehicle)
- SEAT IBE
- Tata Nano EV
- Valmet Eva

== 2000s ==
=== 2009 ===
The 2009 Geneva Motor Show was held from 5–15 March 2009. The following vehicles were introduced:

==== Production cars ====
- Alpina B6 GT3 racecar
- Alpina B7 (F01/F02)
- Artega GT Roadster
- Aston Martin V12 Vantage
- Aston Martin DBS Volante
- Aston Martin One-77
- Audi A4 allroad
- Audi TT RS
- Bentley Continental Supersports
- Bitter Vero Sport (rebodied Holden Commodore SS (VE))
- Brabus G V12 S Biturbo
- Cadillac SRX (European debut)
- Chevrolet Spark (European debut)
- DR2
- Ferrari 599 GTB Fiorano Handling GT Evoluzione package
- Ferrari 599XX
- Fiat 500C
- Ford Focus RS (final production version)
- Ford Ranger (European debut)
- Hyundai i20 3-door
- Lamborghini Murciélago LP670-4 SV
- Lotus Exige S
- Maybach Zeppelin
- Mazdaspeed3
- Mercedes-Benz E-Class Coupé
- Mini Cooper S Convertible JCW
- Opel Ampera
- Pagani Zonda Cinque
- Peugeot 206+
- Porsche 911 GT3
- Renault Clio (facelift)
- Renault Mégane Sport Tourer
- Renault Scénic / Grand Scénic
- Ruf Dakara
- Saab 9-3X
- Škoda Yeti
- Spyker C8 Aileron
- Tata Indica EV
- Tata Nano
- Toyota Verso
- Volkswagen Polo
- Volvo S80
- Wiesmann MF4-S
- Zagato Perana Z-One

==== Concept cars ====
- Alfa Romeo MiTo GTA (prototype/concept)
- Aston Martin Lagonda
- BMW 5 Series Gran Turismo
- Citroën DS Inside
- Dacia Duster
- Ford iosis MAX
- Giugiaro Namir Hybrid
- Hyundai Ix-onic
- Infiniti Essence
- Kia No.3
- Koenigsegg Quant
- Magna Steyr MILA EV
- Nissan Qazana
- Rinspeed E2
- Rinspeed iChange
- Rolls Royce 200EX
- Subaru Legacy

=== 2008 ===
The 2008 Geneva Motor Show was held from 6–16 March 2008. The following vehicles were introduced:

==== Production cars ====
- 500 Abarth
- Alfa Romeo 8C Spider
- Artega GT
- Audi A3 Cabriolet
- Audi Q5
- Audi Q7 V12 TDI
- Bentley Continental GTZ Zagato
- Bitter Vero (rebodied Holden Caprice)
- BMW M3 Cabriolet
- Brabus Mercedes-Benz SLR McLaren Roadster
- Bugatti Veyron Hermes
- Chevrolet Aveo 3-door
- Citroën Berlingo
- Citroën C5
- Dacia Sandero (European Versión)
- Fiat Fiorino Qubo
- Ford Fiesta
- Ford Focus Coupé-Cabriolet
- Ford Kuga
- Honda Accord (European version)
- Honda Fit (European version)
- Infiniti FX
- Jaguar XKR-S
- KTM X-Bow Dallara
- Lamborghini Gallardo LP560-4
- Lancia Delta
- Lotus Europa SE
- Maserati GranTurismo S
- Mercedes-Benz CLC Coupé
- Mercedes-Benz CLS-Class (W219) (facelift)
- Mercedes-Benz SL (facelift)
- Mercedes-Benz SL63 AMG
- Mercedes-Benz SLK (facelift)
- Morgan Aeromax
- Renault Koleos
- Renault Twingo RS
- Subaru Legacy 2.0D flat-4 turbodiesel
- Toyota iQ
- Toyota Urban Cruiser
- Volkswagen Scirocco
- Volvo XC60

==== Concept cars ====
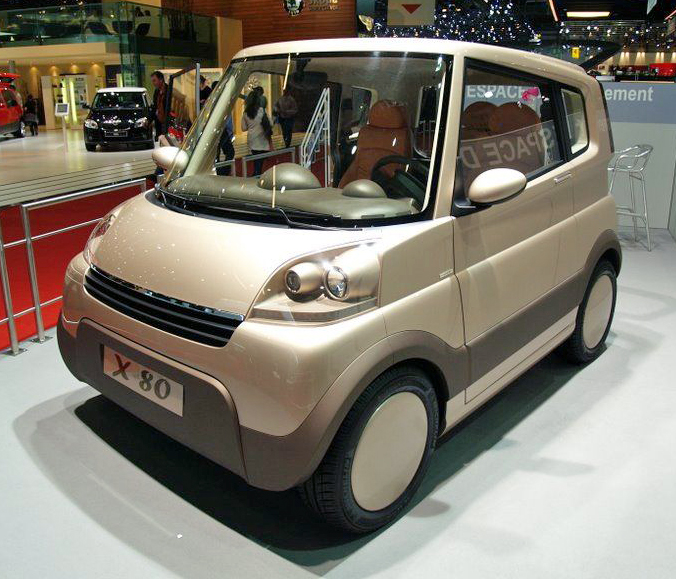
the Espace X80

- Aston Martin V12 Vantage RS
- Audi R8 V12 TDI
- BYD F3DM
- Espace X80
- Fioravanti Hidra
- Giugiaro Quaranta
- Hyundai HED-5 i-Mode
- IED Maserati Chicane
- Kia Soul
- Land Rover LRX
- Magna Steyr MILA Alpin
- Mitsubishi Prototype-S
- Morgan LIFEcar
- Pininfarina Sintesi
- Renault Mégane Coupé Concept
- Rinspeed sQuba
- Saab 9-X Biohybrid
- Sbarro Alcador GTB
- SEAT Bocanegra
- Suzuki A-Star
- Opel Meriva
- Toyota 1/X

=== 2007 ===
The 2007 Geneva Auto Show was held from 8–18 March 2007. The following vehicles were introduced:

==== Production cars ====
- Abarth Grande Punto
- Audi A5
- Alpina B3 (E90)
- Audi S5
- Bentley Brooklands
- BMW 1 Series (E87) 5-door (facelift) & 3-door
- BMW 5 Series (E60) (facelift)
- BMW M5 (E60) Touring
- Cadillac CTS (European introduction)
- Cadillac Escalade (European introduction)
- Cadillac SRX facelift
- Cadillac STS-V (European introduction)
- Cadillac XLR-V (European introduction)
- Chevrolet HHR (European introduction)
- Citroën C4 Picasso 5-seater
- Citroën C-Crosser
- Daihatsu Cuore (European introduction)
- Diatto Ottovù Zagato
- Fiat Bravo
- Ford C-MAX facelift
- Ford Mondeo Mk3
- Gumpert Apollo Sport
- Hyundai i30
- Kia cee'd Wagon
- Koenigsegg CCXR
- Lamborghini Gallardo Superleggera
- Lexus IS-F (European introduction)
- Lexus LS600h/600hL (European introduction)
- Lotus 2-Eleven
- Maserati GranTurismo Coupé
- Mazda 2
- Mercedes-Benz C-Class
- Mercedes-Benz G-Class (facelift)
- MINI Cooper D & One
- Mitsubishi Outlander (European introduction)
- Nissan 350Z facelift
- Nissan X-Trail
- Opel Agila
- Opel Corsa OPC
- Pagani Zonda R
- Peugeot 207 CC
- Peugeot 207 GTi
- Peugeot 4007
- Mégane Renault Sport dCi
- Renault Scénic Conquest
- Saab 9-3 BioPower
- Renault Twingo
- Rolls-Royce Phantom Drophead Coupe
- Škoda Fabia
- Smart Fortwo Brabus
- Subaru R1e EV (European introduction)
- Suzuki SX4 Saloon (European introduction)
- Suzuki Wagon R+
- Toyota Auris 3-door
- Volkswagen Passat BlueMotion
- Volvo V70

==== Concept cars ====
- Bertone Barchetta roadster
- BMW M3
- Dodge Demon Roadster
- EDAG LUV
- Fioravanti Thalia
- Giugiaro Vadho
- Honda Small Hybrid Sports Concept
- Hyundai QarmaQ
- Kia ex cee'd Convertible
- Kia Rio Hybrid (European introduction)
- KTM X-Bow
- Jaguar C-XF
- Lexus LF-A (European introduction)
- Magna Steyr MILA Future
- Mazda Hakaze
- Opel GTC
- Peugeot 207 SW Outdoor
- Peugeot 4007 Holland & Holland
- Proton Gen-2 EVE Hybrid
- Rinspeed eXasis
- Russo-Baltique Impression
- Saab BioPower100
- Spyker C12 Zagato
- Tata Elegante
- Toyota FT-HS Hybrid Sport (European introduction)
- Toyota Hybrid X

In addition, Subaru introduced its new boxer diesel engine, and Honda showed its next generation clean diesel engine.

==== Alternative propulsion section ====
- Bolloré Bluecar
- Fiat Panda, hybrid petrol -natural gas.
- Ford Focus Turnier 2.0
- Honda FCX Clarity
- Opel Corsa D, with optimized 100HP 1.6l natural gas engine. Serial production will be evaluated.
- Reva Greeny AC1 and AC1 Z (G-Wiz in the UK)
- Subaru R1e, small electric city car, with a battery that can be 80% recharged in just 15 minutes.

=== 2006 ===
The 2006 Geneva Auto Show was held from 3–19 March 2006. The following vehicles were introduced:

==== Production cars ====
- A.D. Tramontana
- Alfa Romeo Spider
- Alfa Romeo 159 Sportwagon
- Audi allroad quattro
- BMW Z4
- Chevrolet Captiva
- Chevrolet Epica
- Daihatsu Terios
- Dodge Nitro EU-Spec.
- Ferrari 599 GTB Fiorano
- Fiat Sedici
- Ford Focus CC
- Ford Galaxy
- Ford S-MAX
- Honda Accord (update)
- Hyundai Accent
- Hyundai Santa Fe
- Kia Carnival
- Kia Sorento (facelift)
- Koenigsegg CCX
- Lamborghini Murciélago LP 640
- Lexus LS 460
- Lotus Europa S
- Maserati GranSport MC Victory edition
- Mazda3 MPS/Mazdaspeed3
- Mercedes-Benz CL-Class
- Mercedes-Benz CLK63 AMG
- Mercedes-Benz CLS63 AMG
- Mercedes-Benz S65 AMG
- Mercedes-Benz SL55 AMG (update)
- Mitsubishi Colt CZC
- Mitsubishi L200
- Mini Cooper JCW GP
- Opel GT
- Pagani Zonda Roadster F
- Peugeot 207
- Porsche 911 (997) Turbo
- Porsche 911 (997) GT3
- Renault Megane (facelift)
- Renault Megane CC (facelift)
- Renault Espace (update)
- Škoda Fabia 1.4 16v
- Škoda Roomster
- Subaru B9 Tribeca
- Suzuki SX4
- Toyota Prius (update)
- Toyota Yaris T Sport
- Tramontana
- Volvo S80

==== Concept cars ====
- Alfa Romeo Diva
- Bertone Fiat Suagnà
- Bolloré Bluecar
- Castagna CrossUp
- Castagna Imperial Landaulet
- Logan Steppe
- Dodge Hornet
- EDAG Biwak
- Fioravanti Skill – based on Fiat Punto
- Honda Civic Type-R Concept
- Hyundai HED-2 Genus
- Kia Cee'd
- Loremo LS
- Lotus APX
- Mitsubishi Concept-EZ MIEV
- Mini Concept Genevé
- Nissan Terranaut
- Nissan Pivo
- Peugeot 207 RCup
- Peugeot 407 Macarena by Heuliez
- Renault Altica
- Rinspeed zaZen
- Rolls-Royce 101EX 2-door coupé
- Saab Aero-X
- SEAT Ibiza Vaillante
- Spyker D12 Peking-to-Paris
- Tata Cliffrider
- Toyota Fine-T
- Toyota Urban Cruiser
- Volkswagen Concept A

=== 2005 ===
The following introductions were made at the 2005 Geneva show:

==== Production cars ====
- Alfa Romeo 159
- Alfa Romeo Brera
- Aston Martin V8 Vantage
- Audi A6 Avant (C6)
- Audi RS4 (B7)
- Audi TT Quattro Sport
- Bentley Continental Flying Spur
- BMW 3 Series (E90)
- BMW M6
- BMW 7 Series (facelift)
- Chevrolet Matiz
- Chevrolet Kalos
- Citroën C1
- Citroën C6
- Daihatsu Sirion
- Dodge Caliber
- Ferrari F430 Spider
- Fiat Croma
- Hyundai Grandeur
- Kia Rio
- Lexus IS
- Lotus Exige Sport 240R
- Maybach 57 S
- Mazda MX-5 Roadster
- Mercedes-Benz B-Class
- Mitsubishi Colt CZC
- Peugeot 107
- Opel Zafira
- Opel Zafira OPC
- Opel Astra OPC
- Rolls-Royce Phantom EWB
- Saab 9-3 SportCombi
- Spyker C12 La Turbie
- Subaru B9 Tribeca
- Toyota Aygo
- Volkswagen Passat (B6)
- Volkswagen Polo (facelift)

==== Concept cars ====
- Bertone Cadillac Villa
- Cadillac BLS
- Dodge Caliber
- Fenomenon Stratos
- Fioravanti Lancia Kandahar
- Ford SAV
- Honda Civic
- Hyundai HED-1
- Lamborghini Concept S
- Laraki Borac
- Magna Steyr MILA
- Maserati Birdcage 75th
- Mitsubishi Colt Coupé-Cabriolet
- Mitsubishi Nessie
- Nissan Zaroot
- Peugeot 407 Prologue Coupe
- Renault Zoe
- Rinspeed Chopster
- Rinspeed Senso
- Škoda Yeti
- Stola S86 Diamante
- Tata Xover

=== 2004 ===
The following introductions were made from 4 to 14 March 2004 at the Geneva show:

==== Production cars ====
- Alfa Romeo Crosswagon Q4
- Audi A6 (C6)
- BMW 5 Series (E60) Touring
- MINI Cabriolet
- Chevrolet Corvette Convertible
- Chrysler Crossfire SRT-6
- Citroën C3 XTR
- Fiat Multipla
- Ford Fiesta ST
- Hyundai Tucson
- Jaguar XK8 facelift
- Jaguar XKR facelift
- Jeep Grand Cherokee "Black Pearl"
- Koenigsegg CCR
- Laraki Fulgura
- Lotus Exige
- Maserati GranSport
- Maserati MC 12
- Mercedes-Benz CLS-Class (W219)
- Mercedes-Benz SLK55 AMG
- Mercedes-Benz SLK-Class
- Opel Tigra TwinTop
- Peugeot 407
- SEAT Altea
- Škoda Octavia
- Toyota Corolla Verso

==== Concept cars ====
- Aston Martin V12 Vanquish Roadster Zagato
- Aston Martin Vanquish Bertone Jet 2
- BMW Concept M5
- DC Design Go
- EDAG genX
- Fiat Trepiùno
- Fiat Idea 5Terre
- Fioravanti Kite
- Ford Fiesta RS
- Hyundai E3
- Italdesign Alfa Romeo Visconti
- Italdesign Toyota Alessandro Volta
- Jaguar BlackJag (by Fuore Design)
- Mazda MX-Flexa
- Nissan Qashqai
- Opel Trixx
- Peugeot 407 Silhouette
- Renault Modus
- Renault Wind concept
- Rinspeed Splash
- Rolls-Royce 100EX Centenary
- Stola S85 Limousine
- Tata Indigo Advent
- Toyota Motor Triathlon Race Car
- Valmet Audi A4 Coupe-Cabrio
- Volkswagen Concept C
- Volvo YCC

=== 2003 ===
The following introductions were made at the 2003 Geneva show:

==== Production cars ====
- Alfa Romeo GT
- Alfa Romeo GTV Coupe
- Alfa Romeo Spider
- Alpina B7 (E65) (prototype)
- Audi A3
- Bentley Continental GT
- BMW M3 CSL
- Daihatsu Cuore
- Ferrari Challenge Stradale
- Fiat Punto (facelift)
- Fiat Idea
- Kia Opirus
- Lamborghini Gallardo
- Lancia Ypsilon
- Mercedes-Benz CLK-Class Cabriolet (A209)
- Mitsubishi Outlander
- Opel Signum
- Opel Zafira (facelift)
- Pagani Zonda Roadster
- Peugeot 307 CC
- Porsche Carrera GT
- Renault Scénic
- Saab 9-3 Convertible
- SEAT Ibiza Cupra R
- Toyota Avensis
- Volkswagen Touran

==== Concept cars ====
- Al Araba 1
- Alfa Romeo Kamal
- Aston Martin AMV8 Vantage
- Audi Nuvolari
- Bertone Birusa
- Chevrolet Corvette Moray by Italdesign
- Chrysler Airflite
- Citroën C2 Sport
- DC Design Gaia
- Fiat Marrakech
- Mazda MX Sportif
- Mitsubishi CZ2 Cabrio
- Nissan Evalia
- Opel GTC Genève
- Peugeot Hoggar
- Pininfarina Enjoy
- Rinspeed Bedouin
- Subaru B11S (by Fuore Design)
- Tata Indica
- Valmet Thunderbird Retractable Glass Roof
- Volvo Versatility Concept Car (VCC)

=== 2002 ===
The following introductions were made at the 2002 Geneva show:

==== Production cars ====
- Audi RS6
- Bentley Arnage R
- Chevrolet Kalos
- Citroën C8
- Ford Fusion
- Hyundai Getz
- Ferrari 575M Maranello
- Fiat Ulysse
- Koenigsegg CC8S
- Lancia Phedra
- Mercedes-Benz CLK-Class (C209)
- Maybach 57 and 62
- Opel Vectra
- Peugeot 206 SW
- Peugeot 307 SW
- Peugeot 807
- Rover 75 Vanden Plas
- Saab 9-3
- Volkswagen Phaeton

==== Concept cars ====
- Alfa Romeo Brera
- BMW CS1
- DC Design Infidel
- EDAG Keinath GT/C Convertible
- Fioravanti Yak
- Hispano-Suiza HS21-GTS
- Laraki Fulgura
- Mazda MX Sport Runabout
- Mitsubishi CZ2
- Nissan Yanya
- Opel Concept M
- Peugeot RC Diamonds
- Renault Espace
- Rinspeed Presto
- Rover TCV
- Saab Novanta
- Škoda Tudor
- Toyota UUV
- Volvo ACC 2

=== 2001 ===
The following major introductions were made at the 2001 Geneva show:

==== Production cars ====
- Aston Martin V12 Vanquish
- BMW 3 Series Compact
- BMW M3
- Mini Hatch
- Fiat Stilo
- Ford Focus RS
- Honda Civic Type R
- Hyundai Terracan
- Jaguar X-Type
- Lexus IS 300 Sportcross
- Lancia Thesis
- Lotec Sirius
- Maserati 3200 GT Assetto Corsa
- Mercedes-Benz A-Class (facelift)
- MG ZT
- Mitsubishi Lancer Evolution VII
- Opel Astra Cabriolet
- Opel Astra Coupe OPC Xtreme
- Opel Zafira OPC
- Porsche 911 GT2
- Peugeot 307
- Renault Clio II (facelift)
- Renault Vel Satis
- Rover 75 Tourer (estate)
- Toyota Avensis Verso
- Volkswagen Passat W8

==== Concept cars ====
- Aston Martin Twenty Twenty
- Bertone Opel Filo
- Citroën Osée
- EDAG Keinath GT/C Sport Coupe
- Fioravanti Alfa Romeo Vola
- Ford Mondeo ST
- Ford StreetKa
- Italdesign Maserati 320S
- Hispano-Suiza K8
- KAZ Eliica
- Mazda MX Sport Tourer
- Nissan Chappo
- Peugeot 307 Cameleo
- Rinspeed Advantige Rone
- Sbarro Christelle
- Smart Crossblade
- Zagato Toyota VM180

=== 2000 ===
The following introductions were made at the 2000 Geneva show:

==== Production cars ====
- Alfa Romeo 156 Sportwagon
- Audi A6 Allroad Quattro
- Ferrari 360 Spider
- Ford Galaxy
- Keinath GTR V8
- Morgan Aero8
- Opel Speedster
- Opel Omega V8
- Renault Scénic RX4
- Rolls-Royce Park Ward
- Toyota Previa
- Volkswagen Sharan

==== Concept cars ====
- Bertone Slim
- Bertrandt Competence Car
- BMW X5 (E53) Le Mans
- Cadillac Imaj
- Citroën Xsara Dynactive
- Coggiola T-Rex
- Dodge Intrepid ESX3
- Hispano-Suiza HS21
- Maserati Buran
- Mazda 626 MPS
- Peugeot 607 Feline
- Peugeot 607 Paladine
- Renault Koleos
- Rinspeed Tattoo
- Sbarro GT12
- Sbarro Montres
- SEAT Salsa
- Tata Aria
- Toyota NCSV (European debut)
- Toyota Yaris Cabrio Concept
- Valmet Raceabout

== 1990s ==
=== 1999 ===
The following concepts and major launches featured at the 1999 Geneva show:

==== Production cars ====
- Aston Martin V8 Vantage Le Mans
- Audi TT Roadster
- BMW 3 Series (E46) Coupe
- Qvale Mangusta
- Ferrari 360 Modena
- Mazda Premacy
- Ford Racing Puma
- Lamborghini Diablo GT
- Mercedes-Benz CL-Class (C215)
- Mitsubishi Pajero Pinin
- Nissan Almera Tino
- Pagani Zonda C12
- Peugeot 406 Break
- Porsche 996 GT3
- Renault Mégane

==== Concept cars ====
- Bentley Hunaudières
- Alfa Romeo Bella by Bertone
- Bugatti EB218
- Citroën C6 Lignage (developed into Citroën C6, launched in 2005)
- Ford Focus Cosworth
- Ford Mondeo ST250 ECO
- I.DE.A One
- Heuliez Pregunta
- Opel Concept A
- Opel Speedster (production model launched in 2000)
- Peugeot 306 HDi
- Sbarro GT1
- Seat Fórmula
- SEAT Toledo Cupra
- Renault Avantime (production model launched in 2001)
- Rinspeed X-Trem
- Valmet Zerone

=== 1998 ===
The following concepts and major launches featured at the 1998 Geneva show:

==== Production cars ====
- Audi A6 Avant
- BMW 3 Series (E46)
- BMW M5 (E39)
- Callaway C12 Coupe (1998-2004)
- Citroën Xsara Break
- Daewoo Matiz
- Ferrari 456M GT
- Ford Focus
- Jaguar XKR
- Lexus IS 200
- Mercedes-Benz CLK-Class Cabriolet (A208)
- Mercedes-Benz E 55 AMG Estate (S210)
- Porsche 911 (996)
- Renault Clio
- Rolls-Royce Silver Seraph
- Suzuki Grand Vitara
- Toyota Yaris
- Volkswagen Golf Cabriolet
- Volvo C70 Cabriolet

==== Concept cars ====
- Bertone Pickster
- Chrysler Pronto Cruiser
- Fioravanti F100
- Hyundai Euro 1
- Peugeot Two-oh-heart
- Renault Zo
- Rinspeed E-Go Rocket
- SEAT Bolero 330 BT
- Volkswagen W12 Roadster

=== 1997 ===
The following introductions were made at the 1997 Geneva show:

==== Production cars ====
- Audi A6
- Audi A8 (facelift)
- Citroen Berlingo Multispace
- Ferrari 550 Maranello
- Ford Puma
- Mercedes-Benz A-Class
- Opel Corsa (facelift)
- Peugeot 306 (facelift), incl. 306 station wagon
- SEAT Arosa
- Toyota Paseo (European introduction)
- Volkswagen Passat Variant

==== Concept cars ====
- Bertone Alfa Romeo Sportut
- Audi A8 Coupé prototype
- Italdesign Alfa Romeo Scighera
- Opel Signum Concept (production model launched 2003)
- Pininfarina Peugeot Nautilus
- Rover Mini Spiritual & Spiritual Too
- Daewoo Shiraz

=== 1996 ===
The following introductions were made at the 1996 Geneva show:

==== Production cars ====
- Ferrari 456 GTA
- Jaguar XK
- Lamborghini Diablo SV-R (race car)
- Lotus Esprit V8
- Mega Monte Carlo
- Renault Scénic (first production compact MPV in Europe)

==== Concept cars ====
- Ford Lynx
- Ford Synergy 2010
- Opel Slalom
- Peugeot 406 Toscana
- Renault Fiftie
- Rinspeed Yello Talbo
- Sbarro Alfa Romeo Issima
- Zagato Raptor
- Qvale Mangusta

=== 1995 ===
The following introductions were made at the 1995 Geneva show:

==== Production cars ====
- Alfa Romeo GTV and Spider
- Alfa Romeo 146
- Ferrari F50
- Lamborghini Diablo SV
- Lancia Delta HPE
- Renault Sport Spider
- MG F

==== Concept cars ====
- Lamborghini Calà
- Lancia Kayak
- Opel Maxx
- Renault Laguna Evado
- Rinspeed Roadster SC-R
- Sbarro Alcador
- Sbarro Mandarine

=== 1994 ===
The following introductions were made at the 1994 Geneva show:

==== Production cars ====
- Audi A8
- Ferrari 333 SP
- Ferrari F355 Berlinetta
- Fiat Ulysse
- Land Rover Discovery
- Maserati Ghibli (AM336) facelift
- Mercedes-Benz S600 L
- Peugeot 806
- Rolls-Royce Flying Spur
- Saab 900S Convertible
- Toyota RAV4

==== Concept cars ====
- Bentley Java
- Bertone Karisma
- Lexus Landau
- Renault Argos
- Rinspeed Cyan
- Sbarro Alfa Romeo 155 Sport Wagon Q4
- Sbarro Oxalys
- Volkswagen Concept One Cabriolet

=== 1993 ===
The following introductions were made at the 1993 Geneva show:

==== Production cars ====
- Aston Martin DB7
- Audi S4
- BMW 325i Convertible
- BMW 840Ci
- Citroën Xantia
- Daihatsu Charade
- Ferrari 348 Spider
- Ford Maverick (first production SUV in Ford range)
- Ford Mondeo (Ford's "world car", to be built in different versions for Europe, North America and Australia)
- Lamborghini Diablo VT
- Lancia Delta
- Mazda Xedos 6
- Mercedes-Benz 300 SD
- Mitsubishi Galant
- Nissan Terrano II
- Opel Astra Cabrio
- Opel Corsa
- Peugeot 306
- Porsche 911 Carrera 4 Coupe Turbolook "30 Jahre 911"
- Porsche 968 Turbo RS
- Volvo 850 GLE
- Volvo 850 GLT

==== Concept cars ====
- Aston Martin Lagonda Vignale Concept (Ghia)
- BMW Z13
- Bugatti EB 112 (ItalDesign)
- De Tomaso Guarà Coupe Prototype
- De Tomaso Guarà Barchetta Prototype
- Esoro E301
- Ferrari FZ93 (Zagato)
- Fiat Downtown Concept
- Fiat Lucciola Concept (ItalDesign)
- Mercedes-Benz Coupe Studie Concept
- Pininfarina Ethos 2
- Renault Racoon
- Rinspeed Veleno
- Sbarro Isatis
- Sbarro Urbi
- Sbarro Citroën ZX Onyx
- Vector Avtech WX3-R Roadster
- Vector Avtech WX3

=== 1992 ===
The following introductions were made at the 1992 Geneva show:

==== Production cars ====
- Alfa Romeo 155
- Aston Martin Virage Volante
- Bugatti EB110 Supersport
- Ferrari 512 TR
- Porsche 911 Turbo S Leichtbau (964)
- Renault Safrane (new flagship model in Renault range)
- Toyota Carina E (first European built Toyota, produced at a new factory near Derby)

==== Concept cars ====
- Lamborghini Diablo Roadster Concept
- Opel Twin
- Sbarro Astro

=== 1991 ===
The following introductions were made at the 1991 Geneva show:

==== Production cars ====
- Aston Martin Virage Volante 2+2
- Bentley Continental R
- BMW 3 Series (E36)
- Mazda Eunos 30X
- Mercedes-Benz S-Class (W140)
- Mitsubishi Pajero
- Opel Frontera

==== Concept cars ====
- Alfa Romeo Proteo
- Pininfarina Opel Chronos
- Sbarro Helios

=== 1990 ===
The following introductions were made at the 1990 Geneva show:

==== Concept cars ====
- Jaguar Kensington
- SEAT Proto TL
- Volvo 480 convertible

== 1980s ==
=== 1989 ===
The following introductions were made at the 1989 Geneva show:

- Alfa Romeo SZ (originally called ES 30)
- Alpina B10 Bi-Turbo
- Chevrolet Corvette ZR-1
- Daihatsu Applause
- Ford Fiesta Urba concept
- Ford Via concept (Ghia)
- Lancia Delta Integrale 16v
- Lotus Carlton (high performance version of Vauxhall Carlton)
- Mercedes-Benz 500SL
- Peugeot Agades concept (Heuliez)
- Sbarro Osmos concept

=== 1988 ===
The following introductions were made at the 1988 Geneva show:

- Ford Saguaro concept (Ghia)
- Maserati Karif
- Sbarro Robur concept

=== 1987 ===
The following introductions were made at the 1987 Geneva show:

- Aston Martin Lagonda (Series 4)
- Sbarro Monster G concept

=== 1986 ===
The following introductions were made at the 1986 Geneva show:

- Aston Martin V8 Zagato coupe
- BMW 524d (E28)
- Citroën Eole concept
- Rover CCV concept
- Sbarro Challenge 2+2 concept
- Volvo 480 (first front-wheel drive Volvo)
- Zender Vision 3C concept

=== 1985 ===
The following introductions were made at the 1985 Geneva show:

- Autobianchi Y10
- Ferrari 412
- Lamborghini Countach LP5000 S Quattrovalvole
- Michelotti PAC (city car prototype)
- Peugeot Griffe 4 concept (Pininfarina)
- Sbarro Challenge concept
- Sbarro Super Five
- Volvo 780

=== 1984 ===
The following introductions were made at the 1984 Geneva show:

- Alfa Romeo 33 1.5 Giardinetta (Estate in the UK)
- Alfa Romeo Tempo Libero concept (Zagato)
- Ferrari 288 GTO
- Ford APV concept (Ghia)
- Isdera Imperator 108i
- Lamborghini Jalpa P350
- Sbarro Super Eight concept
- Sbarro Mercedes Benz Biturbo
- Zagato Z33 "Free Time"

=== 1983 ===
The following introductions were made at the 1983 Geneva show:

- Alfa Romeo Delfino concept
- Alfa Romeo Zeta Sei concept (Zagato)
- Fiat Ritmo Coupe concept (Pininfarina)
- Ford Trio concept (Ghia)
- Lincoln Quicksilver concept
- Renault Gabbiano concept (Italdesign)

=== 1982 ===
The following introductions were made at the 1982 Geneva show:

- Bentley Mulsanne Turbo
- Lamborghini LMA002 prototype
- Michelotti CVT 58 concept
- Opel Corsa Spider concept
- Sbarro Super Twelve concept
- Volkswagen Golf GTD (Mk1)

=== 1981 ===
The following introductions were made at the 1981 Geneva show:

- AC Ghia concept
- Audi Quartz concept (Pininfarina)
- Covini B24 concept
- Felber Roberta (Lancia Delta based)
- Ford Avant Garde concept (Ghia)
- Ford Cockpit concept (Ghia)
- Lamborghini LM001
- Lamborghini Miura P400 SVJ Spider one-off
- Lamborghini Jalpa
- Lola Ultimo concept (Michelotti)
- Wolfrace Sonic

=== 1980 ===
The following introductions were made at the 1980 Geneva show:

- Audi Quattro
- Felber Illustre (Audi 80 (B2) based)
- Felber Pasha (Buick Skylark based)
- Ferrari Mondial 8
- Fiat Panda
- Fiat Ritmo D
- Ford Granada Altair concept (Ghia)
- Range Rover Monteverdi
- Reliant Scimitar GTE SE6B

== 1970s ==
=== 1979 ===
The following introductions were made at the 1979 Geneva show:

- Felber Rubis 112 (Autobianchi A112 based)
- Isuzu Asso di Fiori concept (Italdesign)
- Monteverdi Military

=== 1978 ===
The following introductions were made at the 1978 Geneva show:

- Dome Zero prototype
- Felber Excellence spider
- Ford Megastar II concept (Ghia)
- Ford Mustang III concept (Ghia)
- Lancia Gamma Spider (Pininfarina)

=== 1977 ===
The following introductions were made at the 1977 Geneva show:

- Ferrari 365 GTC/4 "Break" by Felber (one-off)
- Felber Excellence coupe
- Lamborghini Cheetah prototype
- Pininfarina Ferrari 308 GTB Millechiodi aerodynamic study
- Porsche 928

=== 1976 ===
The following introductions were made at the 1976 Geneva show:

- Alfa Romeo Navajo concept
- Alfasud 5m
- Ferrari 365 GTC/4 beach car by Felber (one-off)
- Lamborghini Silhouette
- Lancia Gamma
- Maserati Kyalami

=== 1975 ===
The following introductions were made at the 1975 Geneva show:

- Ferrari 208 GT4
- Felber Lancia FF concept (Lancia D24 Spider Replica) (Lancia Fulvia based)
- Ford Capri S
- Lancia Beta HPE
- Lancia Beta Montecarlo
- Maserati Merak SS
- Monteverdi Palm Beach
- Peugeot 604

=== 1974 ===
The following introductions were made at the 1974 Geneva show:

- Citroën CX
- Felber Ferrari FF (Ferrari 166 Spider Corsa Replica) (Ferrari 330 GTC based)
- Lamborghini Countach LP400
- Mercedes-Benz 450SEL 6.9
- Sbarro BMW 328 replica
- Sbarro Stash
- Volkswagen Scirocco

=== 1973 ===
The following introductions were made at the 1973 Geneva show:

- Autobianchi A112 Giovani concept
- Filipinetti X1/9 race car
- Lamborghini Countach third prototype
- Sbarro Tiger concept
- Sbarro SV-1 concept
- Volkswagen Scirocco

=== 1972 ===
The following introductions were made at the 1972 Geneva show:

- Citroën GS Camargue concept
- Ferrari Dino 246 GTS
- Opel Commodore B
- Ranger B (1700/1900/2500)
- Volvo VESC concept

=== 1971 ===
The following introductions were made at the 1971 Geneva show:

- Alpine A310
- Hispano Alemán Vizcaya 914/6 by Frua
- Lamborghini Countach LP500 prototype
- Maserati Bora
- Monteverdi 375/4
- Monteverdi High Speed 375 C

=== 1970 ===
The following introductions were made at the 1970 Geneva show:

- Alfa Romeo Montreal
- BMW Garmisch concept
- Citroën SM
- Ferrari Modulo concept
- Ford Capri RS2600 partial mockup
- Matra M530LX
- Mercedes-Benz C111-II Concept
- Monteverdi Hai 450
- Range Rover
- Volvo GTZ 3000 concept

== 1960s ==
=== 1969 ===
The following introductions were made at the 1969 Geneva show:

- Ferrari Sigma
- Lancia Fulvia Berlinetta Competizione concept
- Maserati Indy
- Peugeot 504 Coupe
- Porsche 917

=== 1968 ===
The following introductions were made at the 1968 Geneva show:

- Lamborghini Espada 400 GT
- Lamborghini Islero
- Lombardi Grand Prix
- Mercedes-Benz 300 SEL 6.3

=== 1967 ===
The following introductions were made at the 1967 Geneva Motor show:

- Fiat Dino (Type 135) Coupé
- Lamborghini Marzal concept
- Matra 530
- Mercedes-Benz 250SL

=== 1966 ===
The following introductions were made at the 1966 Geneva show:

- Alfa Romeo Giulia Sprint GT Veloce
- Alvis TF 21
- Bizzarrini 5300 Spyder S.I. prototype
- BMW 1600-2
- Ferrari 330 GTC
- Ferrari 365
- Isuzu 117 Coupé prototype
- Lamborghini 400 GT 2+2
- Lamborghini Miura P400 prototype
- Vauxhall XVR concept

=== 1965 ===
The following introductions were made at the 1965 Geneva show:

- Alfa Romeo Giulia GTC (public debut)
- Alfa Romeo Giulia Super (public debut)
- Fiat 850 Coupe
- Renault 16
- TVR Trident (Fissore)

=== 1964 ===
The following introductions were made at the 1964 Geneva show:

- Ferrari 500 Superfast
- Lamborghini 350 GT
- Porsche 904

=== 1963 ===
The following introductions were made at the 1963 Geneva show:

- Chevrolet Testudo concept (Bertone)
- Fiat 2300 Cabriolet Speciale prototype (Pininfarina)
- Jaguar D-Type rebodied by Michelotti
- Mercedes-Benz 230SL

=== 1962 ===
The following introductions were made at the 1962 Geneva show:

- Alfa Romeo 2600
- Alfa Romeo Giulietta Sprint Speciale Coupe
- Ferrari 250 GT Bertone (one-off)
- Ferrari Superfast III (Pininfarina)
- Maserati Sebring
- Simca 1000 Coupé

=== 1961 ===
The following introductions were made at the 1961 Geneva show:

- Jaguar E-Type (British-built luxury sports coupe and roadster) (Driven overnight to the stadium)
- Lancia Appia Sport
- Volvo P1800

=== 1960 ===
The following introductions were made at the 1960 Geneva show:

- Alfa Romeo Giulietta SZ
- Alfa Romeo Superflow IV show car
- Ferrari 250 GT California Spyder SWB
- Gordon-Keeble GT prototype (The Gordon)
- O.S.C.A. 1500 Coupe (Fissore)
- Triumph Herald Convertible (small four-seater open top saloon car)

== 1950s ==
=== 1959 ===
The following introductions were made at the 1959 Geneva show:

- Abarth 850 Coupe Scorpione (Allemano)
- Abarth 850 Spider Riviera (Allemano)
- Alfa Romeo Spider Super Sport show car
- Berkeley B95
- Berkeley B105
- Lancia Appia (third series)
- Simca Fulgur
- Scimitar (aluminum prototypes designed by Brooks Stevens)

=== 1958 ===
The following introductions were made at the 1958 Geneva show:

- Arbel Symétric (second version)
- Cadillac Skylight Coupe (Pininfarina)
- Studebaker-Packard Astral

=== 1957 ===
The following introductions were made at the 1957 Geneva show:

- Abarth 750 Coupe Goccia (Vignale)
- Ferrari 250 GT Cabriolet Pininfarina Series I
- Lancia Appia Coupé
- Rometsch Lawrence

=== 1956 ===
The following introductions were made at the 1956 Geneva show:

- Abarth 215A Coupé Bertone concept
- Ferrari 250 GT Coupé Boano
- Ferrari 250 GT Berlinetta "no-louvre"
- Fiat 600 Multipla Marine (Pininfarina)
- Lancia Appia (second series)
- Soletta 750 concept

=== 1955 ===
The following introductions were made at the 1955 Geneva show:

- Fiat 1100 TV Trasformabile
- Fiat 8V Berlinetta Speciale (Pininfarina)
- Maserati A6G/54 Zagato Spider

=== 1954 ===
The following introductions were made at the 1954 Geneva show:

- Fiat 1100 Familiare

=== 1953 ===
The following introductions were made at the 1953 Geneva show:

- Ferrari 250 MM
- Fiat 1100
- Lancia Aurelia PF200 C Spider (Pininfarina)
- Rometsch Beeskow (won the "Golden Rose of Geneva" award)

=== 1952 ===
The following introductions were made at the 1952 Geneva show:

- Fiat 8V

=== 1951 ===
The following introductions were made at the 1951 Geneva show:

- Arbel Symétric (first version)

=== 1950 ===
The following introductions were made at the 1950 Geneva show:

- Fiat 1400

== 1940s ==
=== 1949 ===
The following introductions were made at the 1949 Geneva show:

- Borgward Hansa 1500
- Isotta Fraschini Tipo 8C Monterosa Special Sedan (Touring)
- Porsche 356

=== 1947 ===
The following introductions were made at the 1947 Geneva show:

- Maserati A6 1500 Berlinetta Speciale (Pininfarina)

== 1920s ==
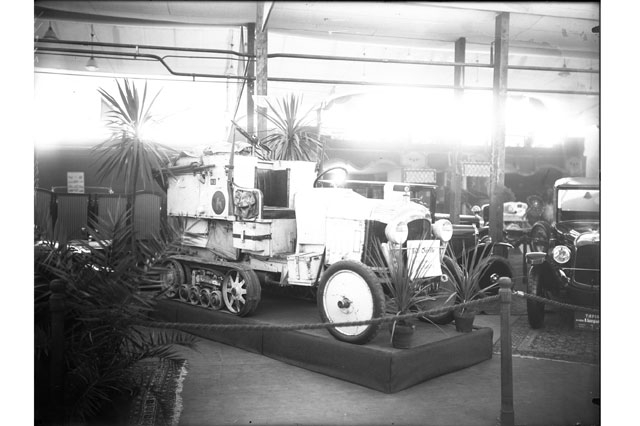
Geneva Motor Show in 1924

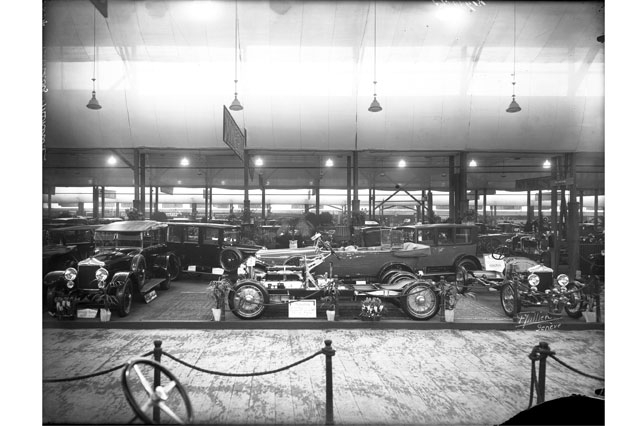
Geneva Motor Show in 1925

== See also ==
- Premiere
- Peugeot Concours Design
- Plainpalais
- Science and technology in Switzerland
