= Sedric =

Prototype of a self driving car by Volkswagen

Sedric is the given name for the prototype of a self driving car by Volkswagen, presented at Geneva Motor Show on 6 March 2017. The name is short for the term self driving car (SElf-DRIving Car). The design of the vehicle is bus-like and seats four. The vehicle's concept feature level 5 autonomy and is designed as a form of public transportation not to be owned by a customer.
