= Kia Sportspace =

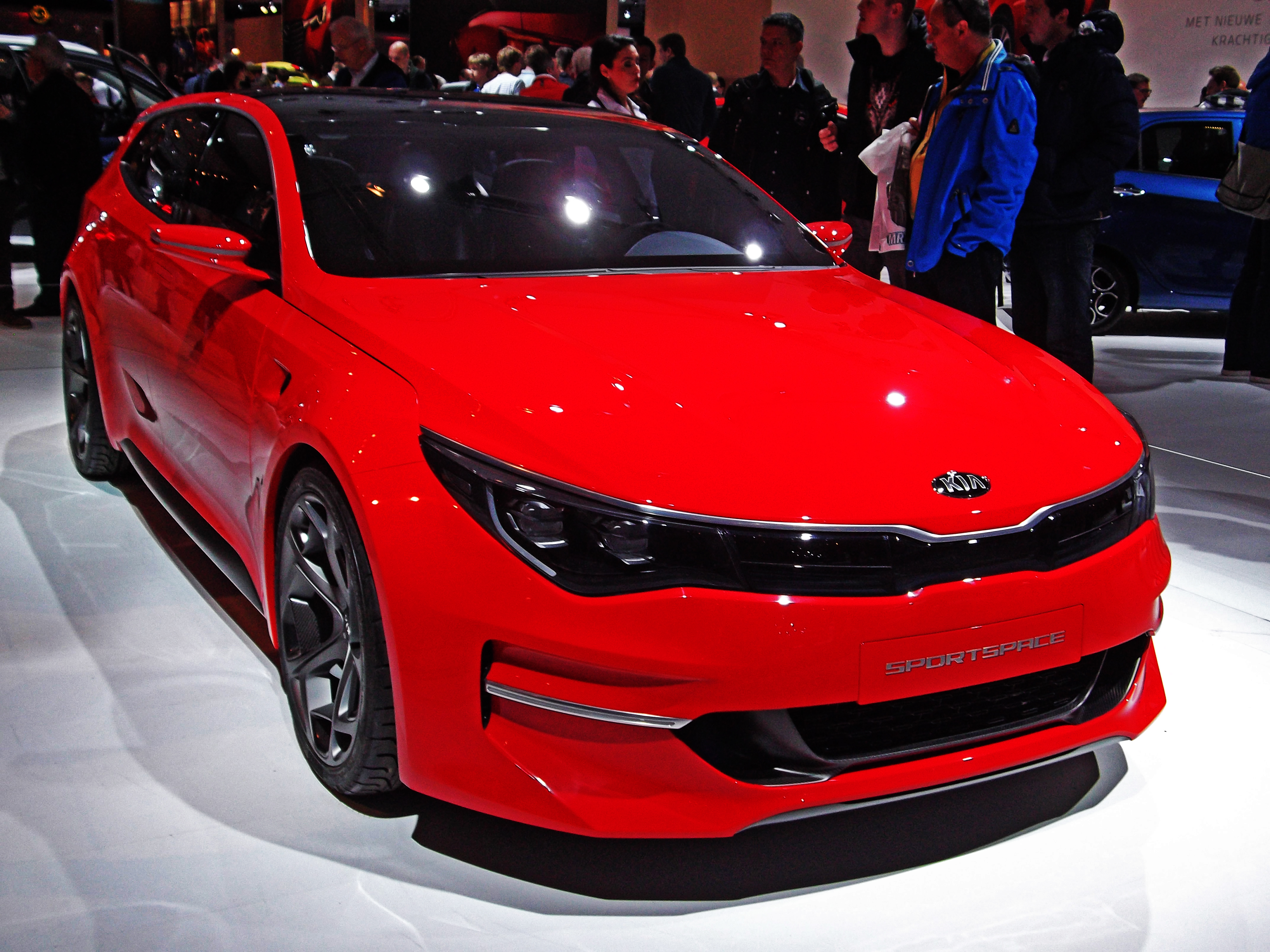
Kia Sportspace

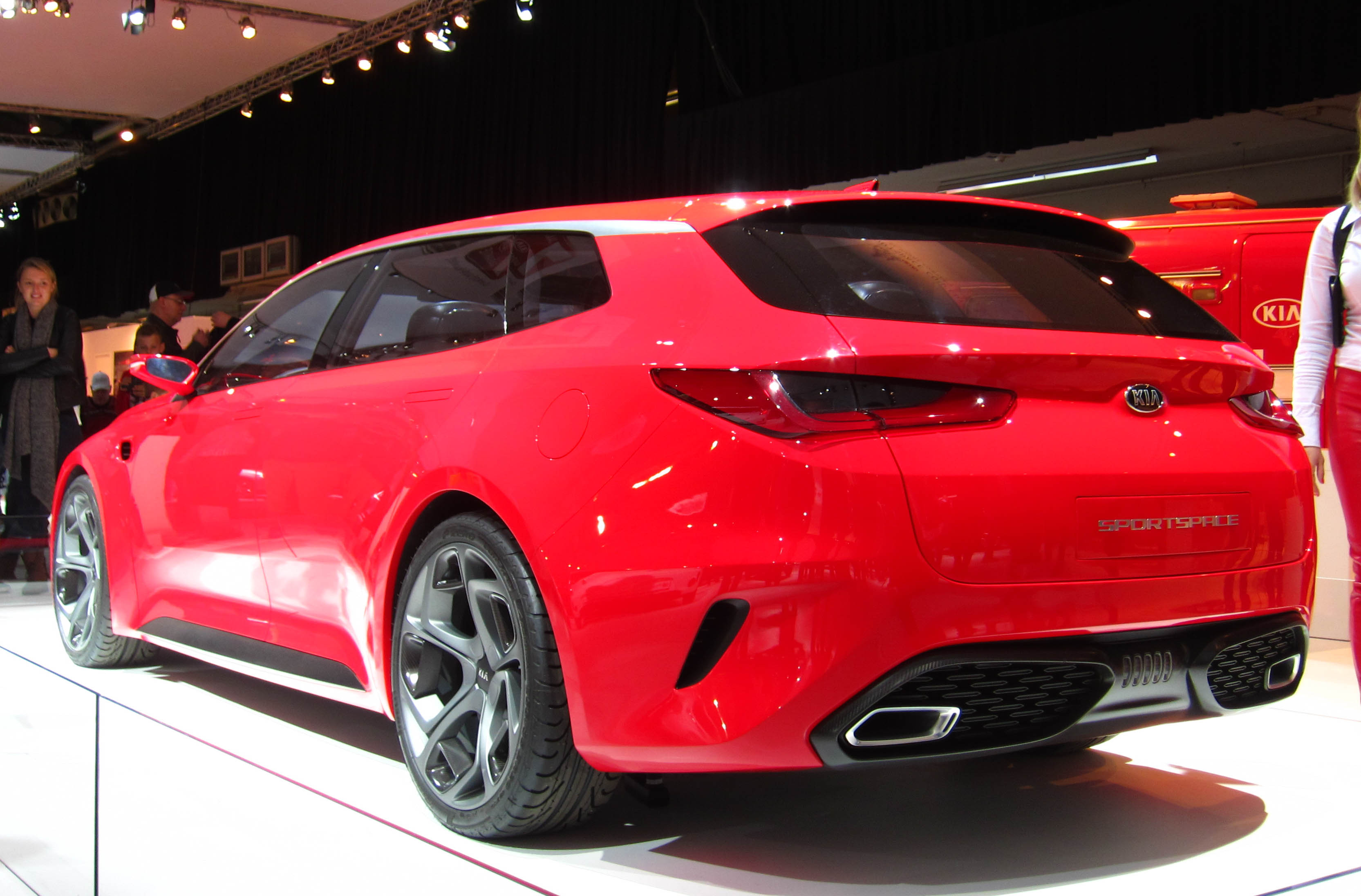
Rear view

The Kia Sportspace is a concept car developed by Kia Motors Europe and showcased at the 2015 Geneva Motor Show. The four seater concept car was made to make long journeys more comfortable. The concept car was designed at the company's Frankfurt design studio.
