= Rolls-Royce Park Ward =

Rolls-Royce Park Ward may refer to one of several vehicles manufactured by Rolls-Royce Motors between 1995 and 2002:

- The limousine version of the Rolls-Royce Silver Spirit Mark IV
- The extended wheelbase version of the Rolls-Royce Silver Seraph
