= Ferrari 412 =

Ferrari used its 412 designation in a number of race and road models, called for the overall engine displacement and number of cylinders of the Jano V12 or Colombo V12 engines; or for the displacement of a single cylinder for the Tipo F101-engined grand tourers. Formula One cars were named after number of valves per cylinder and for the number of cylinders.

The following models used the 412 name:

- 1958 Ferrari 412 MI, purpose-built racer for the second edition of the 500 Miles of Monza
- 1958 Ferrari 412 S, Sports racing car
- 1967 Ferrari 412 P, Sports prototype racing car
- 1985 Ferrari 412, Grand tourer
- 1994 Ferrari 412 T1, Formula One racing car; also called Ferrari 412 T1B
- 1995 Ferrari 412 T2, Formula One racing car
