= Ferrari 500 Superfast =

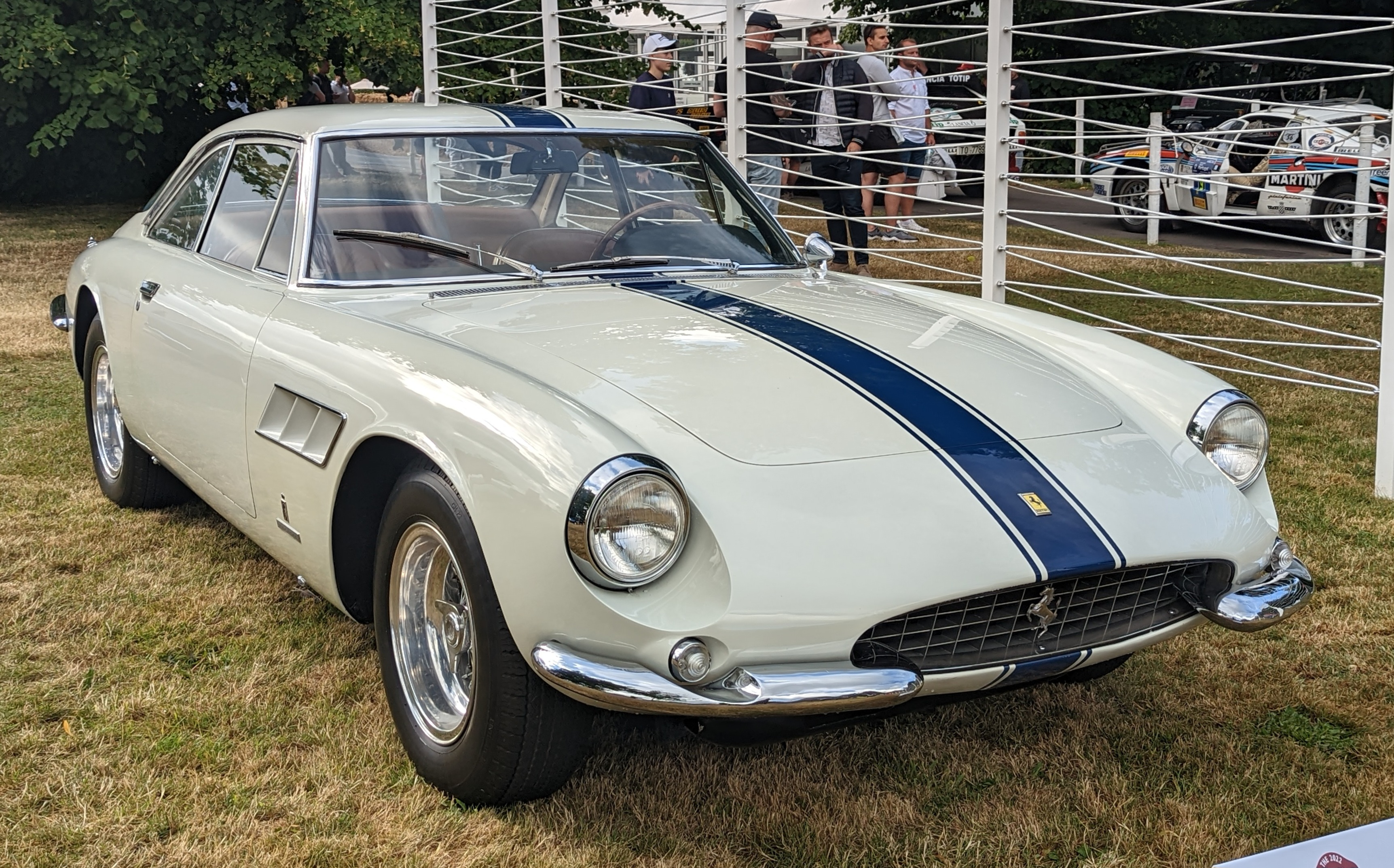

Overview
- Manufacturer: Ferrari
- Production: 1964–1966; 37 produced
- Assembly: Italy: Maranello
- Designer: Pininfarina

Body and chassis
- Class: Grand tourer
- Body style: 2+2 coupé
- Layout: Front-engine, rear-wheel-drive

Powertrain
- Engine: 5.0 L (4962.96 cc) Tipo 208 Colombo V12
- Transmission: 4-speed manual (Series I); 5-speed manual (Series II)

Chronology
- Predecessor: Ferrari 400 Superamerica
- Successor: Ferrari 365

The Ferrari 500 Superfast is a flagship grand tourer manufactured by Ferrari between 1964 and 1966 with 37 built. It featured a 5-litre V12 producing 394 hp.

Having previously been used as a title only for special projects, the 500 Superfast was the first production car with the title and the final version of the America-series of grand tourers. At the time it was Ferrari's most luxurious offering, costing £11,518 at launch.

== Series I ==
The first 25 units of the production run are known as Series I, being the baseline. It featured a 4-speed transmission with overdrive.

== Series II ==
The last 12 units are known as Series II. They feature a new 5-speed transmission, different cooling vents behind the front wheels, a new clutch and different pedals.

== Chassis numbers ==
| Chassis no. | Note |
|---|---|
| 5951SF | Prototype |
| 5977SF | |
| 5979SF | |
| 5981SF | |
| 5983SF | |
| 5985SF | Sold in 2016 for $2,750,000. |
| 5989SF | Sold in 2011 for $935,000. |
| 6033SF | Sold in 2026 for $1,545,000. |
| 6039SF | |
| 6041SF | |
| 6043SF | |
| 6049SF | |
| 6303SF | Sold in 2025 for $1,446,000. |
| 6305SF | |
| 6307SF | |
| 6309SF | |
| 6345SF | Destroyed in a crash. |
| 6351SF | |
| 6605SF | Previously owned by the Shah of Iran. |
| 6615SF | |
| 6659SF | |
| 6661SF | |
| 6673SF | |
| 6679SF | |
| 7817SF | |
| 7975SF | Previously owned by the Shah of Iran. |
| 8019SF | |
| 8083SF | |
| 8253SF | |
| 8273SF | |
| 8299SF | |
| 8459SF | |
| 8565SF | Sold in 2024 for $1,627,500. |
| 8739SF | |
| 8817SF | |
| 8897SF | |
