= Ferrari 365 =

Ferrari 365 GT 2+2
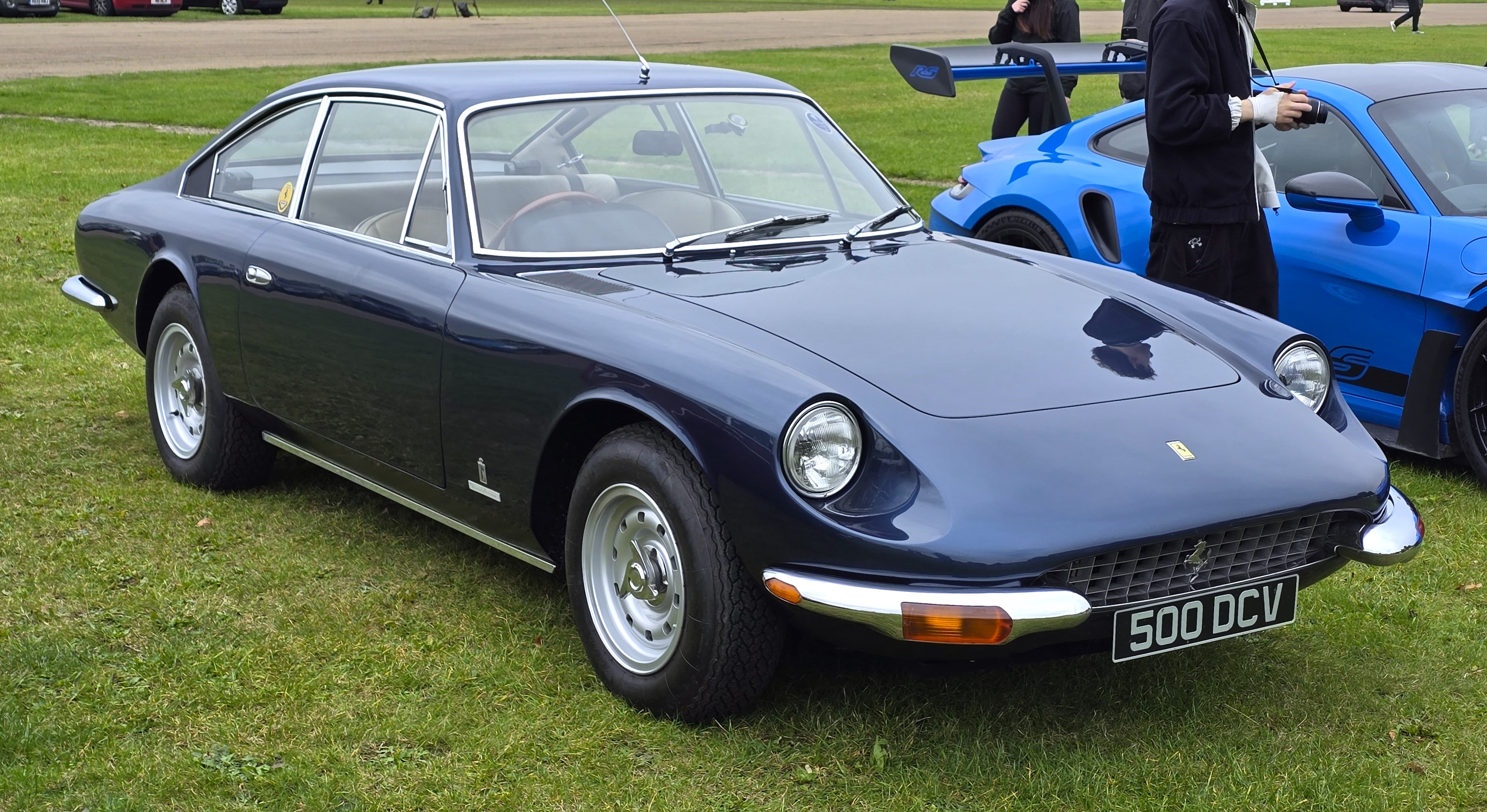
- Ferrari 365 GT 2+2

Overview
- Manufacturer: Ferrari
- Production: Assembled between 1967 and 1971 with 801 cars produced
- Assembly: Italy: Maranello

Body and chassis
- Class: Grand tourer
- Layout: Front-engine, rear-wheel-drive

Powertrain
- Engine: 4.4 L (4390.35 cc) Colombo V12

Chronology
- Predecessor: Ferrari 500 Superfast

See also Ferrari 365 GT4 2+2 & Ferrari 365 GTC/4 for later 2+2 models, and Ferrari Daytona for the 365 GTB/4 & GTS/4

The Ferrari 365 is a large front-engine, rear-wheel-drive 2- and 2+2-seater grand tourer produced by Ferrari. Introduced at the 1966 Geneva Motor Show, it replaced the 330 and 500 Superfast.

== 365 California ==
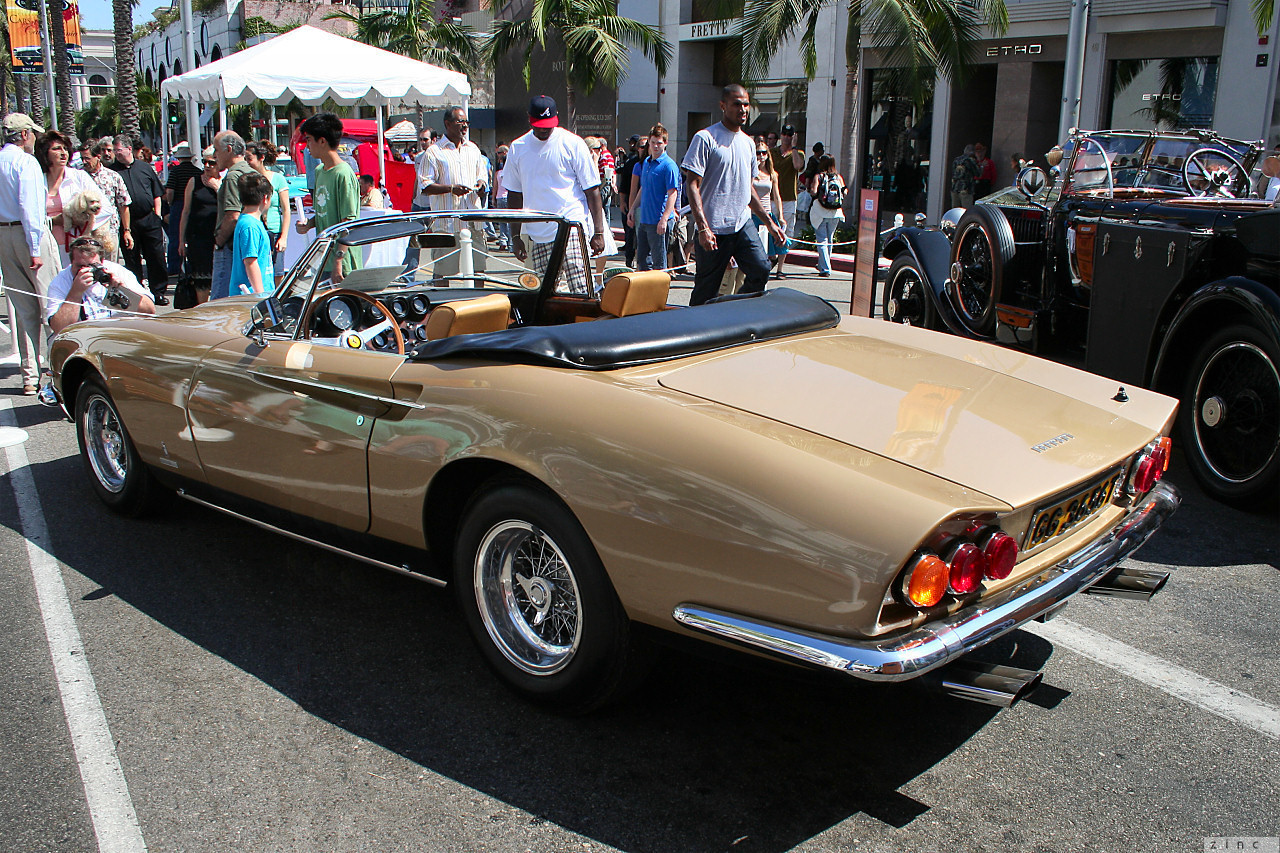
1966 Ferrari 365 California rear

Ferrari 365 California
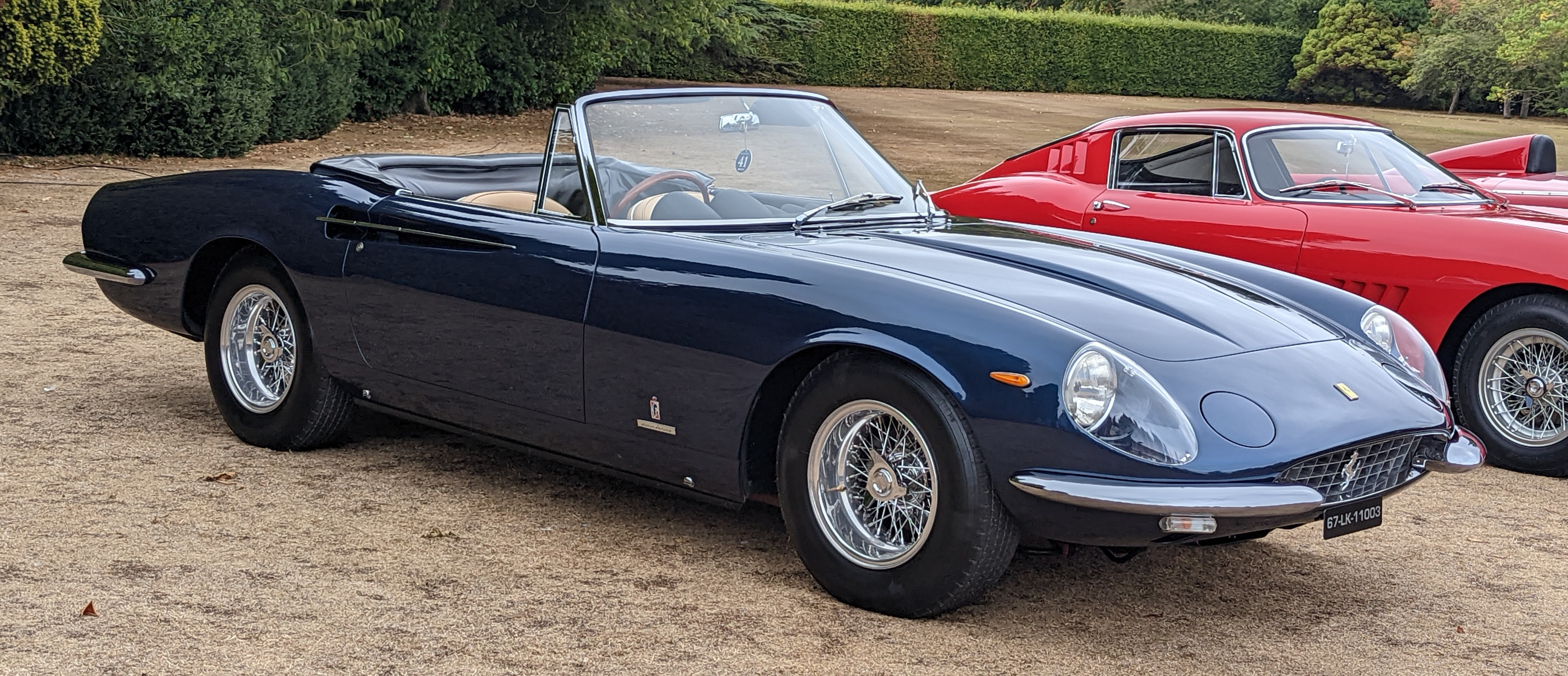

Overview
- Production: 1966–1967; 14 produced
- Designer: Tom Tjaarda at Pininfarina

Body and chassis
- Body style: Convertible
- Related: 500 Superfast

Powertrain
- Engine: 4.4 L Tipo 217B Colombo V12

Dimensions
- Wheelbase: 2,650 mm (104.3 in)
- Length: 4,900 mm (192.9 in)
- Width: 1,780 mm (70.1 in)
- Height: 1,330 mm (52.4 in)
- Kerb weight: 1,320 kg (2,910 lb)

The 365 California replaced the 500 Superfast for 1966. It was the first 365 model, with its 4.4 L (4,390 cc; 267.9 cu in) V12 based on the 330's 4.0 L Colombo unit but with an 81 mm bore. This later version of the Colombo engine was rated at 320 PS (235 kW), in street tune using three Weber carburettors.

The 365 California used the same chassis as the 500 Superfast but with an evolutionary cabriolet body by Pininfarina. Debuting at the Geneva Motor Show in 1966, just 14 examples were produced (including 2 in right hand drive) before production ended in 1967. Whilst the prototype was built on a 330 GT 2+2 type 571 chassis, production cars featured type 598 chassis. Chassis' were sent to Pininfarina's Grugliasco plant to be bodied and trimmed which were later returned to Ferrari to finish their mechanical components.

On 28 June 2005, a pristine 365 California sold for €736,000 (US$890,000).

== 365 GT 2+2 ==
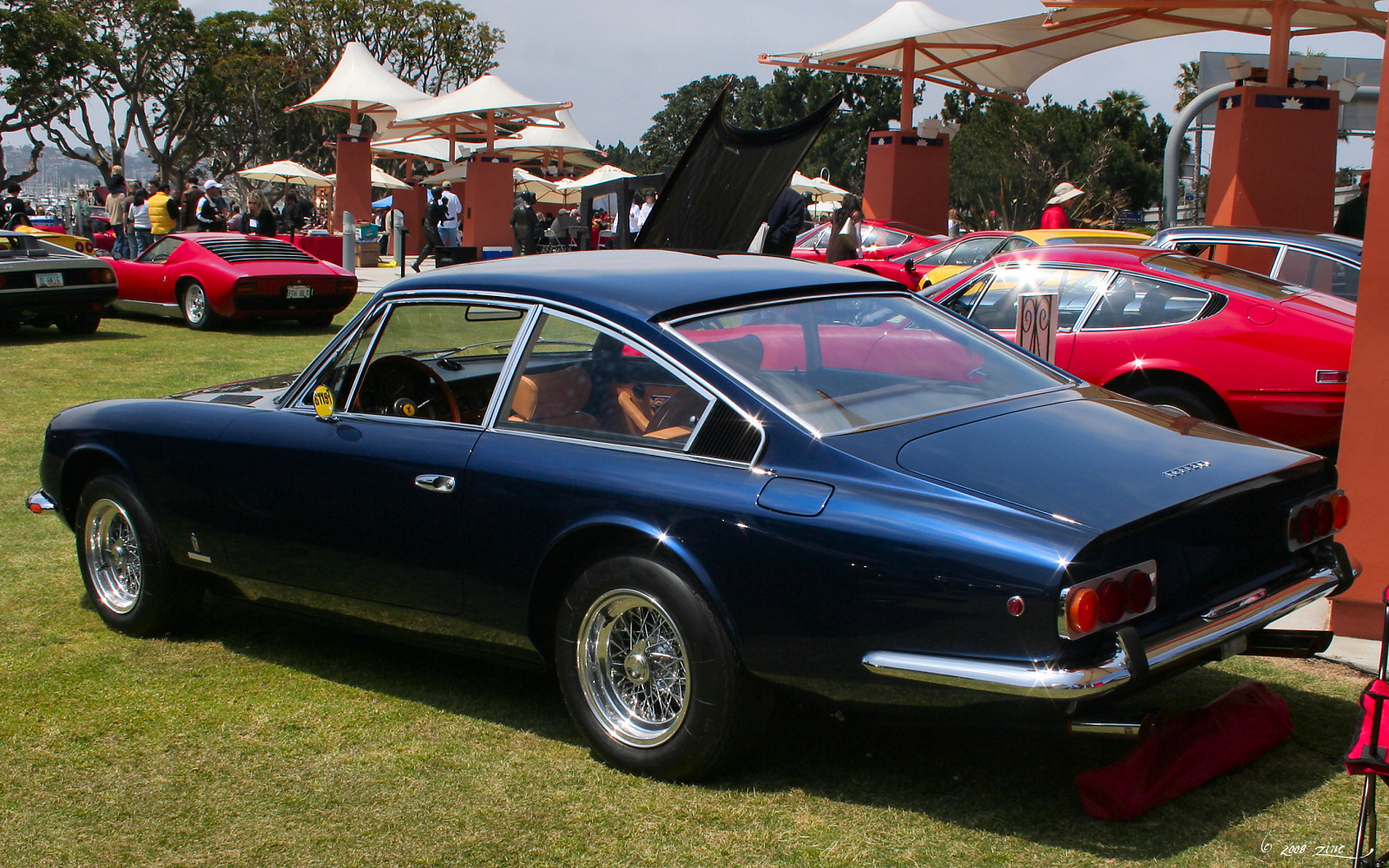
1968 Ferrari 365 GT 2+2 rear

Ferrari 365 GT 2+2
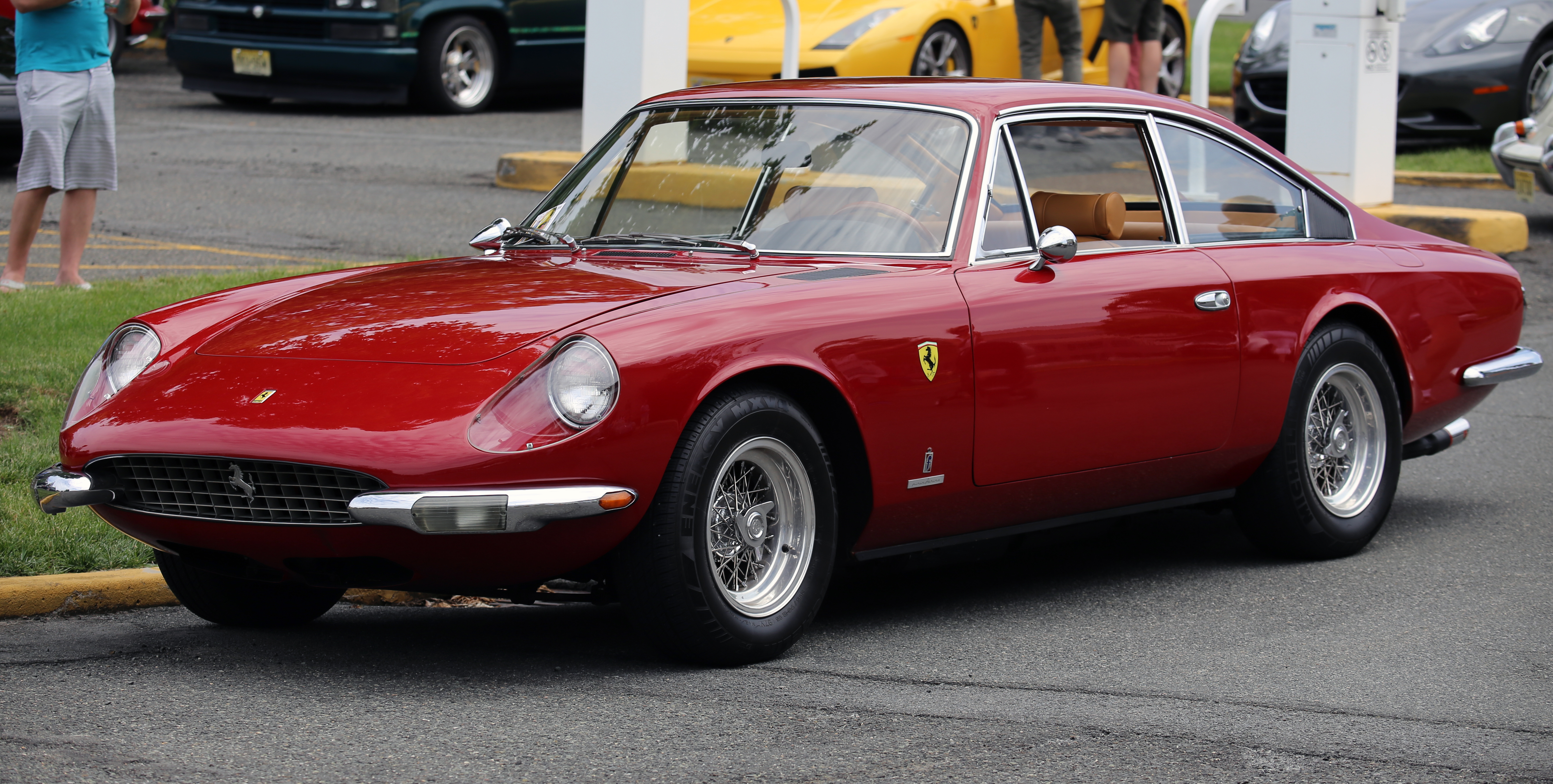

Overview
- Production: 1967–1971; 800 produced
- Designer: Aldo Brovarone at Pininfarina

Body and chassis
- Body style: 2+2 coupé

Powertrain
- Engine: 4.4 L Tipo 245 Colombo V12

Dimensions
- Wheelbase: 2,650 mm (104.3 in)
- Length: 4,974 mm (195.8 in)
- Width: 1,786 mm (70.3 in)
- Height: 1,345 mm (53.0 in)
- Kerb weight: 1,480 kg (3,263 lb) (dry)

Chronology
- Predecessor: Ferrari 330 GT 2+2
- Successor: Ferrari 365 GT4 2+2

The most popular 365 model was 1967's 365 GT 2+2, replacing the 330 GT 2+2. Unlike the 330 GT 2+2 car it replaced, which had a live rear axle on leaf springs, the 365 GT 2+2 had independent rear suspension.

The 365 GT 2+2 was a luxurious car with leather seats, power steering and brakes, electric windows, and optional air conditioning. It quickly became the company's top-selling model with about 800 produced in four years, 52 of which were right hand drive.

== 365 GTC and GTS ==
Ferrari 365 GTC Ferrari 365 GTS
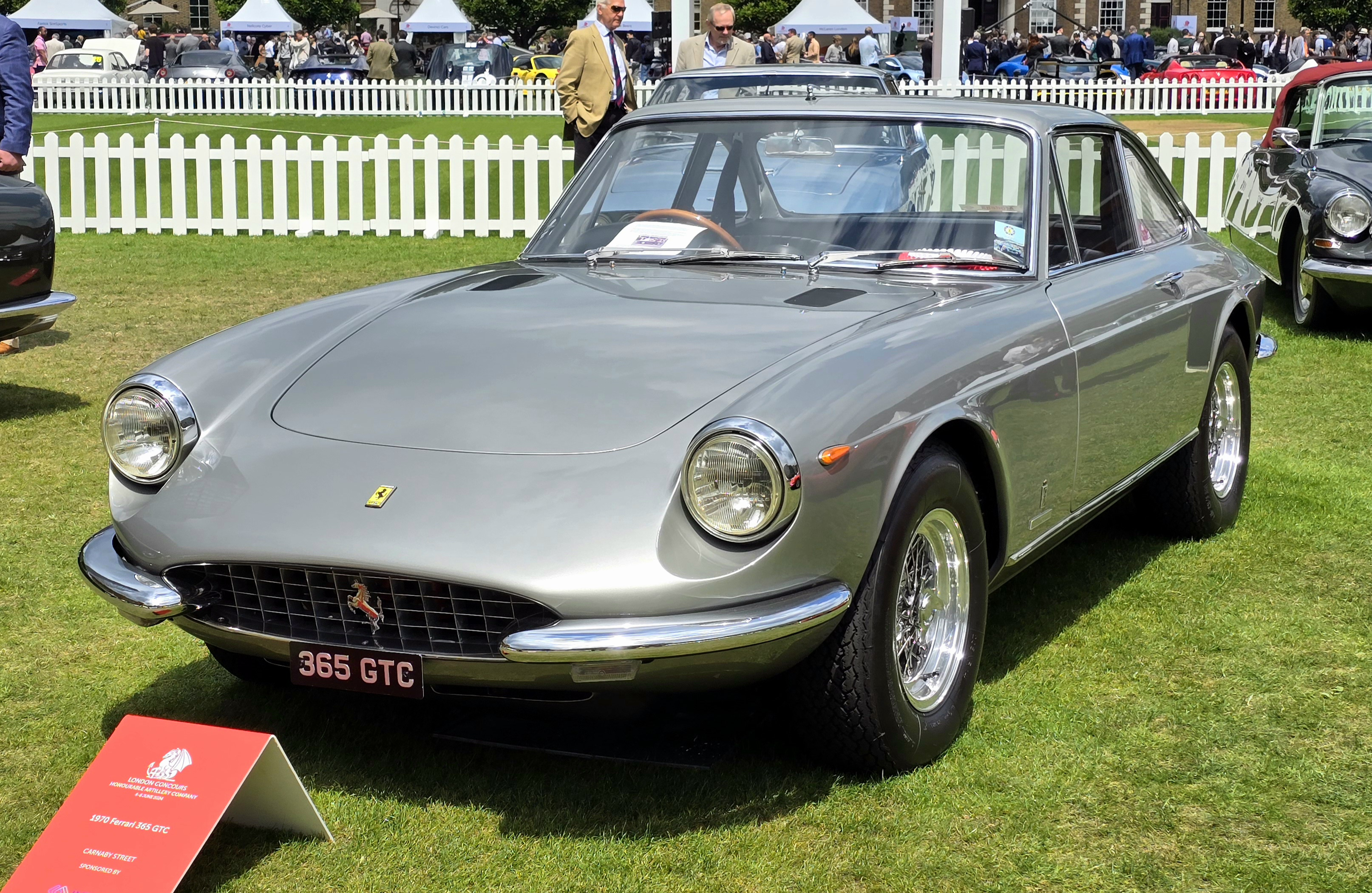

Overview
- Production: 1968–1970; GTC: 168 produced GTS: 20 produced
- Designer: Aldo Brovarone at Pininfarina

Body and chassis
- Body style: GTC: 2-seat coupé GTS: 2-seat spider

Powertrain
- Engine: 4.4 L Tipo 245C Colombo V12
- Transmission: 5-speed manual all-synchromesh

Dimensions
- Wheelbase: 2,400 mm (94.5 in)
- Length: 4,470 mm (176.0 in)
- Width: 1,670 mm (65.7 in)
- Height: 1,300 mm (51.2 in)
- Kerb weight: 1,350 kg (2,976 lb) (dry)

Chronology
- Predecessor: GTC: Ferrari 330 GTC; GTS: Ferrari 330 GTS
- Successor: GTC: Ferrari 365 GTC/4; GTS: Ferrari 365 GTS/4

The 330 GTC and GTS were replaced in 1968 by the 365 GTC and GTS. It was essentially a re-engine of the 330 GTC/GTS, with the engine increasing from 4.0 liters and 300 horsepower to 4.4 liters and 320 horsepower. The styling remained almost unchanged: on both body styles differences were limited to vents moved from behind the front wheels to the bonnet.

Like all 365s, the GTC and GTS were powered by a 4,390 cc Colombo V12 engine, specifically its Tipo 245/C variant. Fed by three twin-choke Weber 40 DFI carburettors, it produced 320 PS (235 kW; 316 hp) at 6,600 rpm. Integrating the gearbox with the final drive gave these cars a balanced 50:50 weight distribution. The 365 GTC and GTS retained the independent rear suspension, employing coil springs and wishbones, of its immediate predecessor. Brakes were servo-assisted discs all-round with a split circuit system.

168 examples of the coupé were built (including 22 in right hand drive) between the 1968 and 1970. It was replaced by the Ferrari 365 GTC/4. Just 20 spiders were built before its place was assumed by the 365 GTB/4-based Daytona Spider.
