= Ferrari 365 GTC/4 =

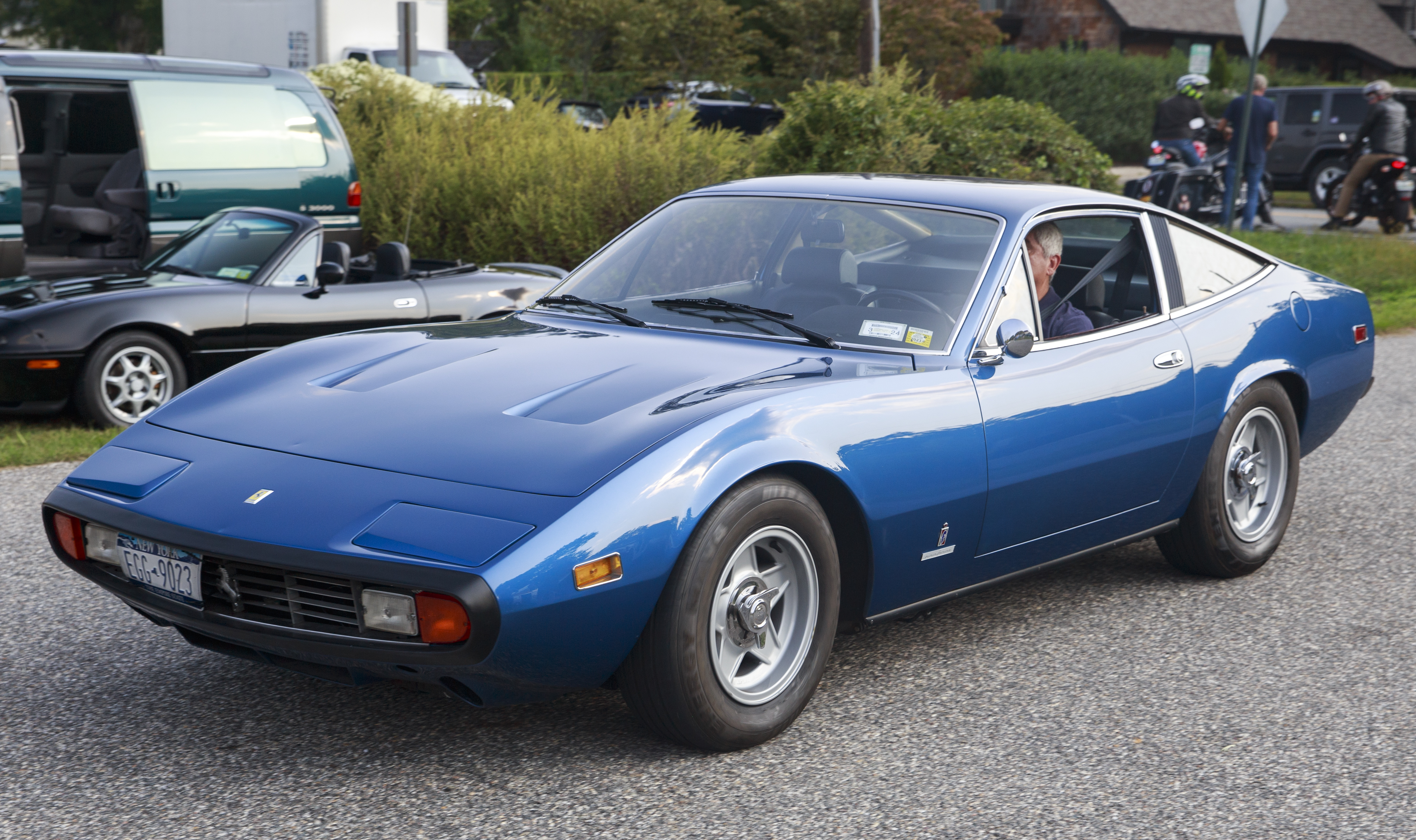
- 1972 365 GTC/4

Overview
- Manufacturer: Ferrari
- Production: 1971–1972; 505 produced
- Assembly: Italy: Modena
- Designer: Filippo Sapino under the supervision of Aldo Brovarone at Pininfarina

Body and chassis
- Class: Grand tourer
- Body style: 2+2 coupé
- Layout: Front-engine, rear-wheel-drive
- Related: Ferrari 365 GTB/4 "Daytona"

Powertrain
- Engine: 4.4 L F 101 AC V12
- Transmission: 5-speed manual

Dimensions
- Wheelbase: 2,500 mm (98.4 in)
- Length: 4,550 mm (179.1 in)
- Width: 1,780 mm (70.1 in)
- Height: 1,270 mm (50.0 in)
- Kerb weight: 1,450 kg (3,197 lb)

Chronology
- Predecessor: Ferrari 365 GTC

The Ferrari 365 GTC/4 (Type F101) is a 2+2 grand tourer produced by Ferrari from 1971 to 1972. It was based on the chassis of the Ferrari 365 GTB/4 "Daytona", and in the very short two-year production run 505 examples of the GTC/4 were produced. Its chassis and drivetrain, however, were carried over mostly unaltered (apart from a wheelbase stretch to provide more satisfying rear seat room) on its successor, the 1972 365 GT4 2+2.

== Design ==
The GTC/4's coupé bodywork by Pininfarina enclosed two front and two rear seats. The rear seats were small and the slanting rear window limited rear headroom. So it can be seen to replace the two-seat 365 GTC that had been discontinued in 1970.

With its wedge shape, fastback silhouette, sharp creases and hidden headlamps the GTC/4's styling clearly reflects the 365 GTB/4 "Daytona" it was based on. Power steering, electric windows and air conditioning were standard. The cabin was upholstered in mixed leather and tartan fabric, unique to this model and unusual for a Ferrari, with full leather upholstery an option.

Ferrari offered 48 different factory paint colors in the years that the 365 GTC/4 was produced. These colors were available on all Ferrari models at that time: the 365 GTC/4, 365 GTB/4, and Dino 246. It is unknown how many of these colors were actually used on 365 GTC/4 models. In addition, Ferrari would allow any special order paint color a well-heeled buyer desired. Regardless of exterior paint color, all 365 GTC/4s received a matte-black tail light panel treatment.

== Specifications ==
The 365 GTC/4 shared the chassis and engine block as the 365 GTB/4 Daytona, riding on the same wheelbase and suspension. Many changes were made to make it a more comfortable grand tourer than its two-seat predecessor and sibling. These included softer spring rate and a hydraulic power steering.

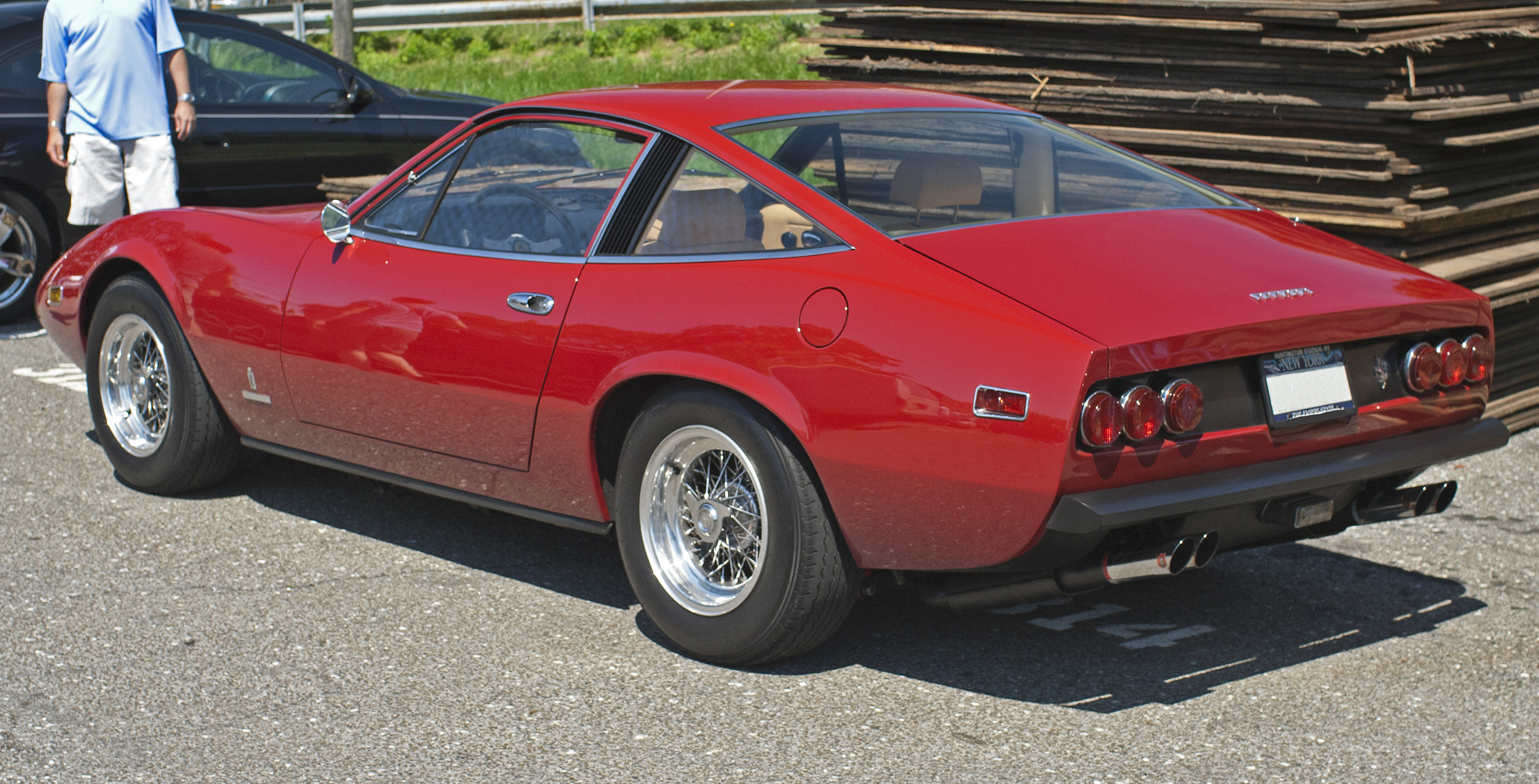
Rear view of a US-specification 1972 365 GTC/4

The chassis was a tubular spaceframe, mated to a steel body with aluminium doors and bonnets; as was customary in this period, the bodies were made and finished by Pininfarina in Turin, then sent to Ferrari in Modena for the assembly. The suspension system used transverse A-arms, coil springs coaxial with the shock absorbers (double at the rear), and anti-roll bars on all four corners. Wheels were cast magnesium on Rudge knock-off hubs, while Borrani wire wheels were optional; the braking system used vented discs front and rear.

The engine was a Tipo F 101 AC 000 Colombo V12, displacing 4,390 cc (4.4 L; 267.9 cu in). Engine block and cylinder heads were aluminium alloy, with cast iron pressed-in sleeves; chain-driven two overhead camshafts per bank (four in total, as noted by the "4" in the model designation) commanded two valves per cylinder.

The V12 was detuned to 340 PS (250 kW; 335 bhp) from the Daytona, to provide a more tractable response suited to a GT-oriented Ferrari. In place of the Daytona's downdraft setup, six twin-choke side-draft Weber carburetors were used, whose lower profile made possible the car's lower and sloping hood line.

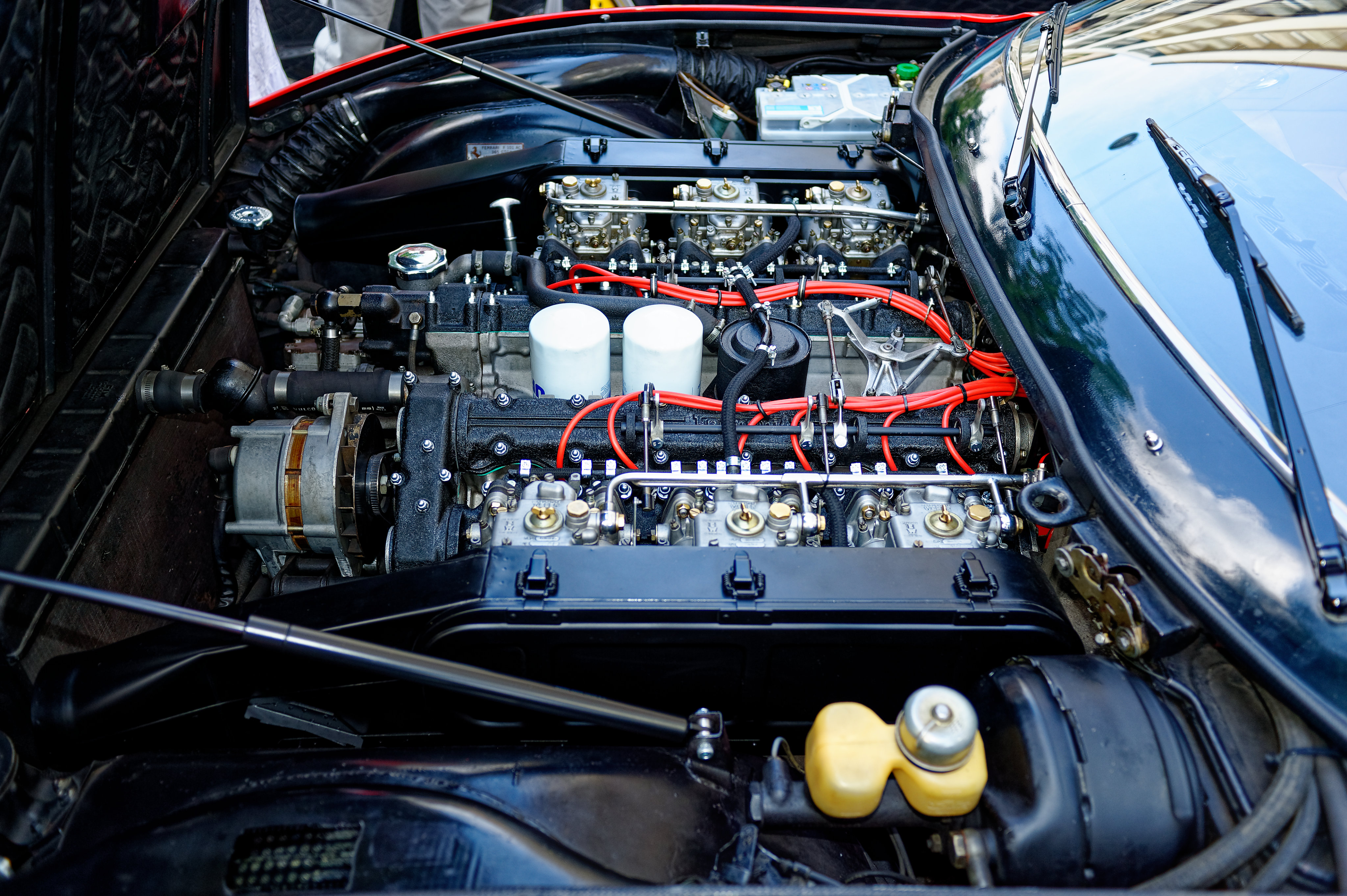
365 GTC/4 engine bay

The 5-speed all-synchronised manual transmission was bolted to the engine, another difference from the Daytona which used a transaxle. However the set back placement of the engine and transmission still allowed the car to achieve a near perfect 51:49 weight distribution. The gearbox was rigidly connected to the alloy housing of the rear differential through a torque tube.

Models for export to the United States were fitted with three-point seat belts, side markers and a number of engine modifications to comply with Federal emission standards, including air injection, carbon canister for evaporative emission control and a different exhaust system. On US-specification cars power was down to 320 PS (235 kW; 316 bhp).
