= Ferrari 365 GT4 2+2, 400 and 412 =

Ferrari 365 GT4 2+2/400/412
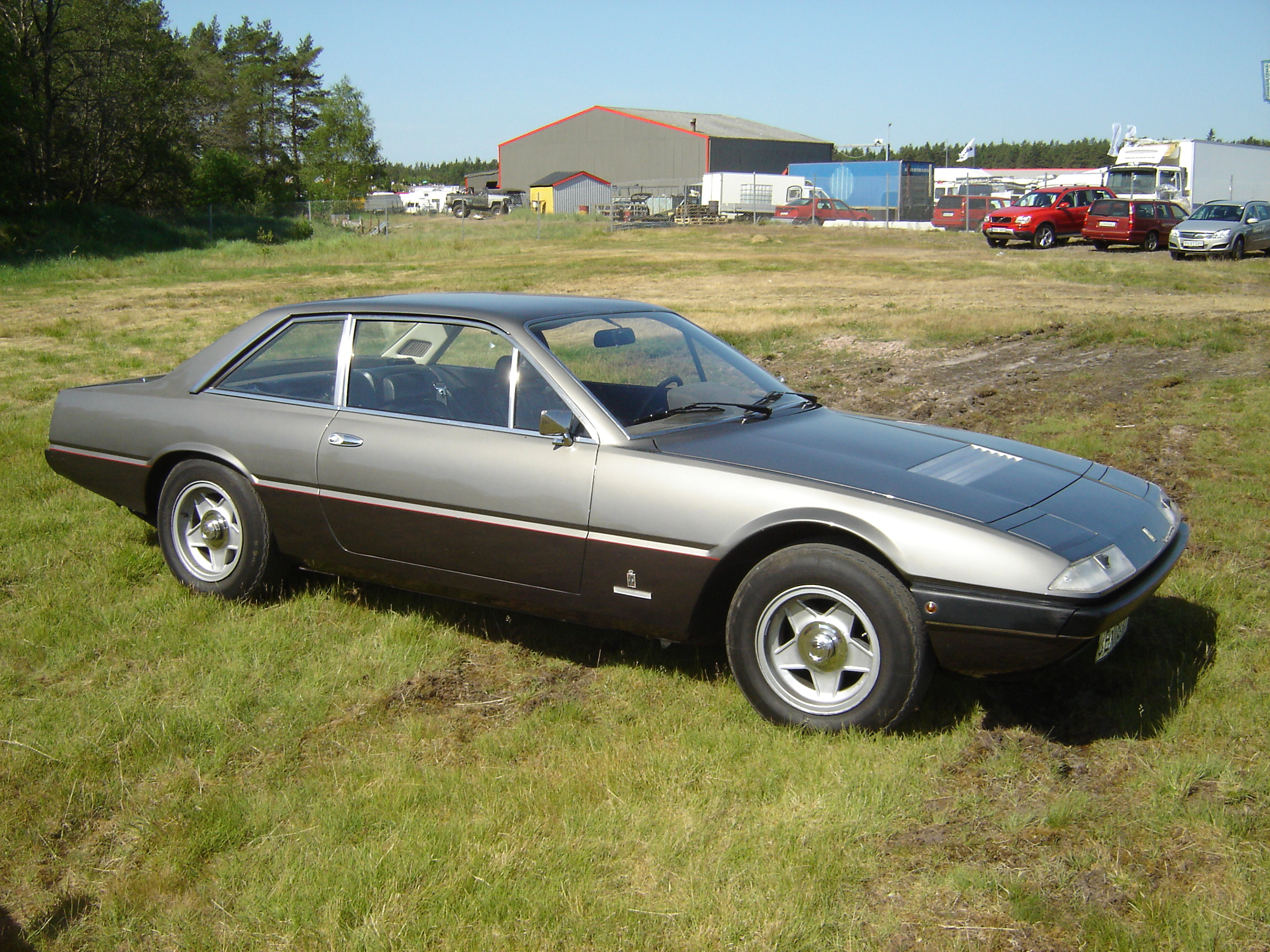
- Ferrari 365 GT4 2+2

Overview
- Manufacturer: Ferrari
- Production: 1972–1989
- Assembly: Italy: Maranello
- Designer: Leonardo Fioravanti at Pininfarina

Body and chassis
- Class: Grand tourer
- Body style: 2+2 coupé
- Layout: Front-engine, rear-wheel-drive
- Related: Ferrari 365 GTC/4

Chronology
- Predecessor: Ferrari 365 GT 2+2
- Successor: Ferrari 456

The Ferrari 365 GT4 2+2, Ferrari 400 and Ferrari 412 (Tipo F101) are a series of four-seater grand touring cars made by Italian manufacturer Ferrari between 1972 and 1989. The three cars are closely related, with the name changes reflecting mainly engine changes and styling revisions. It has a front-mounted V12 engine which drives the rear wheels.

Following Ferrari practice, their numeric designations refer to their engines' single-cylinder displacement expressed in cubic centimetres. The 365 GT4 2+2 was introduced in 1972 to replace the 365 GTC/4. It then evolved into the 400, the first Ferrari available with an automatic transmission. In 1979 the 400 was replaced by the fuel injected 400 i. The improved 412 ran from 1985 to 1989, bringing to an end Ferrari's longest-ever production series.

Although the option of an automatic transmission might imply it may have been designed for the American market, no version of these grand tourers was ever officially imported there as Enzo Ferrari believed that emerging environmental and safety regulations and a 55 MPH national speed limit suggested the company's eight-cylinder cars would suffice in the US market. Many, however, entered as grey imports.

== Design ==
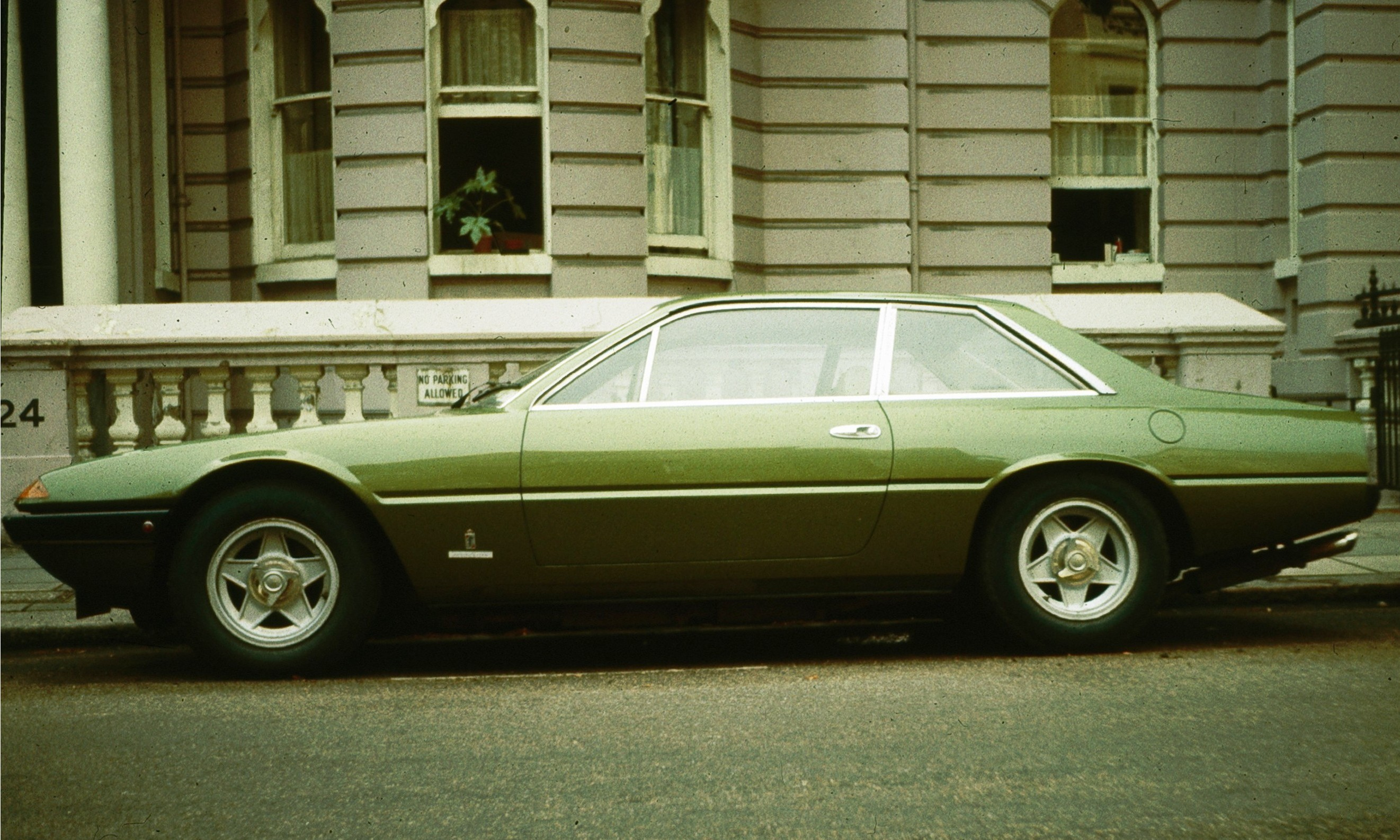
The 365 GT4 2+2 followed a three-box design

Ferrari turned to frequent styling partner Leonardo Fioravanti at Pininfarina, whose three-box design for the 365 GT4 2+2 was a clear departure from its fastback predecessor, the 365 GTC/4. It followed Fioravanti's Ferrari 365 GTB/4 Daytona as the second Ferrari to feature the characteristic swage line dividing the body into upper and lower halves.

Various coachbuilders, such as Carrozzeria Pavesi and Straman, offered convertible conversions of the 400 series. Switzerland's Felber also showed a shooting brake version on 400 GT basis called the Felber Croisette at the 1981 Geneva Salon de l'Auto.

== Specifications ==
The tubular steel chassis was based on that of the GTC/4, but the wheelbase was lengthened 200 mm (7.9 in) to 2,700 mm (106.3 in). The bodies were steel, with a fiberglass floor; they were manufactured by Pininfarina at its Turin plant, then shipped fully finished to Modena where Ferrari assembled the cars. Suspension consisted of double wishbones, coil springs coaxial with the shock absorbers, and anti-roll bars all around; the rear axle featured a hydraulic self-levelling system. Under the bonnet there was a Tipo F 101 Colombo V12 that underwent many changes through the years. It was an alloy head and block, four overhead cams, 24-valve unit using wet sump lubrication. The transmission was conventionally coupled directly to the engine, as on the GTC/4, with a driveshaft connecting it to the rear limited-slip differential. The steering was servo-assisted. Brakes were discs on all four wheels.

Model	Engine type	Displacement	Bore x stroke	Fuel system	Maximum power at rpm
365 GT4 2+2	F 101 AC 000	4.4 L (4,390 cc)	81 x 71 mm	Carburetor	340 PS (250 kW; 335 bhp) at 6200
400 Automatic	F 101 C 080	4.8 L (4,823 cc)	81 x 78 mm	Carburetor	340 PS (250 kW; 335 bhp)
400 GT	F 101 C 000	4.8 L (4,823 cc)	81 x 78 mm	Carburetor	340 PS (250 kW; 335 bhp)
400 Automatic i	F 101 D 070	4.8 L (4,823 cc)	81 x 78 mm	Fuel injection	310–315 PS (228–232 kW; 306–311 bhp) at 6500
400 GT i	F 101 D 010	4.8 L (4,823 cc)	81 x 78 mm	Fuel injection	310–315 PS (228–232 kW; 306–311 bhp) at 6500
412 (automatic)	F 101 E 070	4.9 L (4,943 cc)	82 x 78 mm	Fuel injection	340 PS (250 kW; 335 bhp) at 6000
412 (manual)	F 101 E 010	4.9 L (4,943 cc)	82 x 78 mm	Fuel injection	340 PS (250 kW; 335 bhp) at 6000

== 365 GT4 2+2 ==
Ferrari 365 GT4 2+2
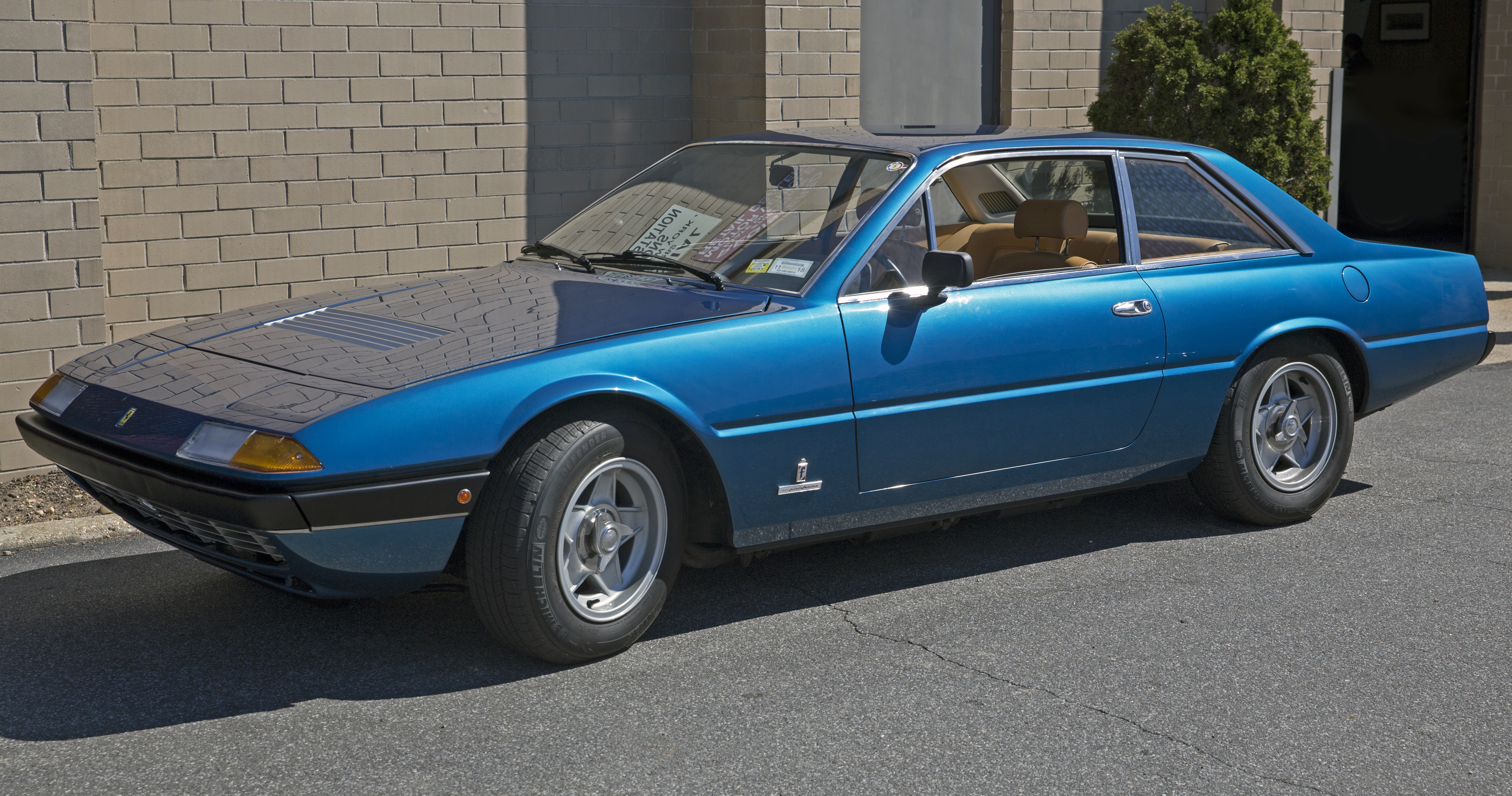

Overview
- Production: 1972–1976

Powertrain
- Engine: 4.4 L F 101 AC V12
- Transmission: 5-speed manual

Dimensions
- Wheelbase: 2,700 mm (106.3 in)
- Length: 4,810 mm (189.4 in)
- Width: 1,796 mm (70.7 in)
- Height: 1,310 mm (51.6 in)
- Curb weight: 1,500 kg (3,307 lb) (empty)

In 1972, just a year after the launch of the GTC/4, a new 2+2 debuted at the Paris Motor Show: the 365 GT4 2+2. The name refers to the single cylinder displacement (365 cc), four overhead camshafts (GT4) and seat configuration (2+2). Most of the mechanicals, including the 4,390 cc (268 cu in) engine, were carried over from its predecessor. The V12 used six side-draft Weber 38 DCOE 59/60 carburetors and produced 340 PS (250 kW) at 6200 rpm. The gearbox was a five-speed, all-synchromesh manual with a single-plate clutch. Five-spoke alloy wheels were mounted on Rudge knock-off hubs; Borrani wire wheels were still offered at extra cost. Fittingly for a large grand tourer, standard equipment included leather upholstery, electric windows and air conditioning. 524 units were produced, including 3 prototypes. The GT4 was replaced in 1976 by the nearly identical looking Ferrari 400.

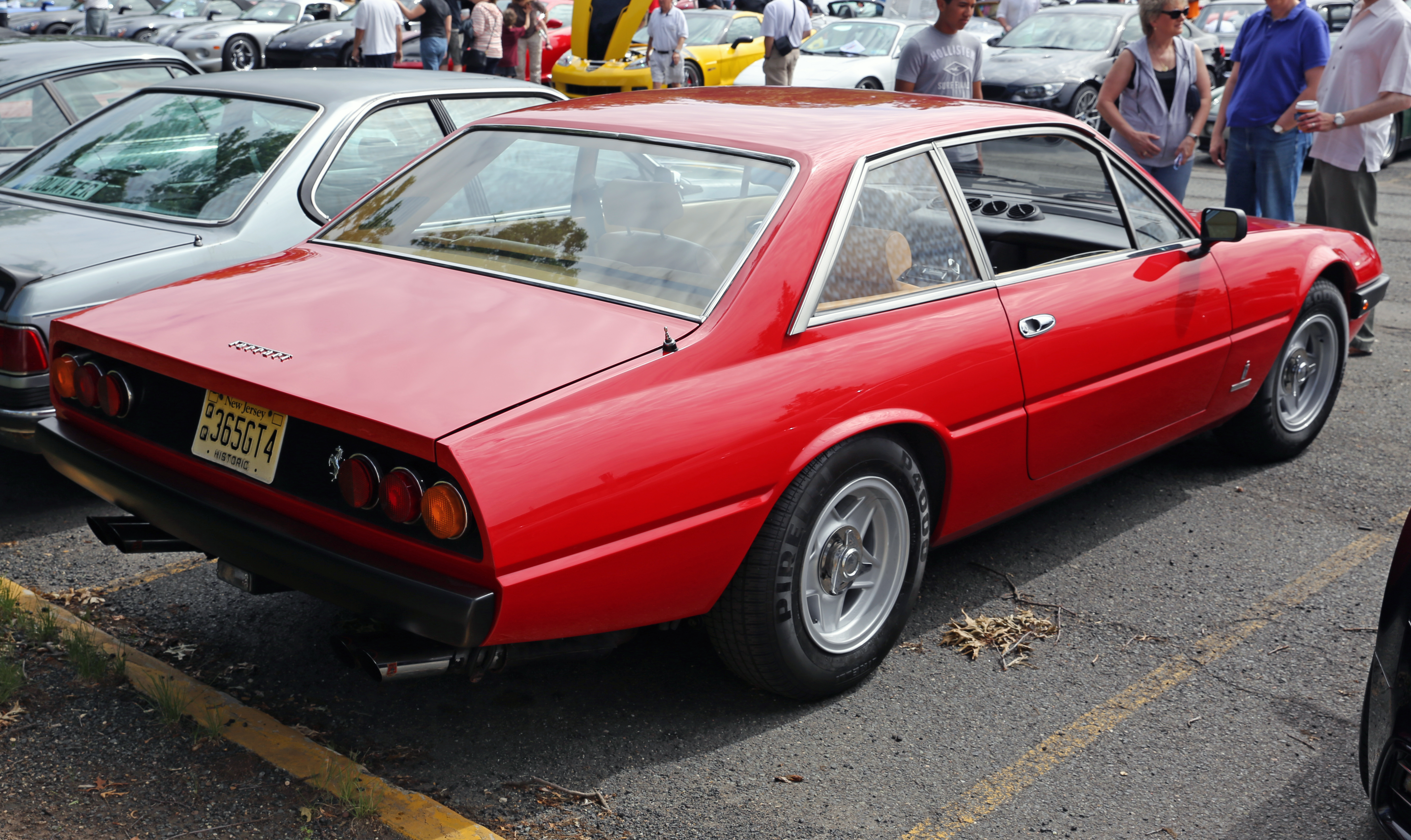
Rear view, showing the six round tail lights characteristic of this model.

== 400 ==
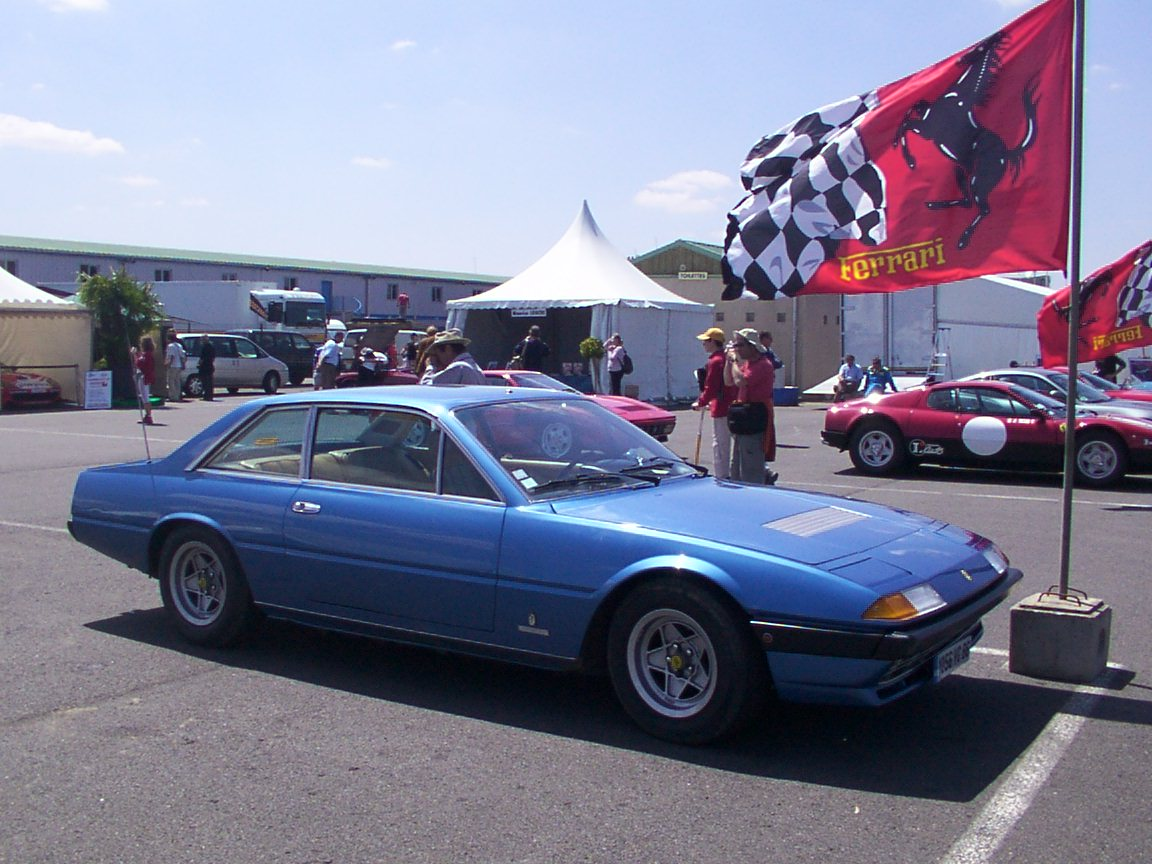
Ferrari 400 Automatic

Ferrari 400 GT Ferrari 400 Automatic
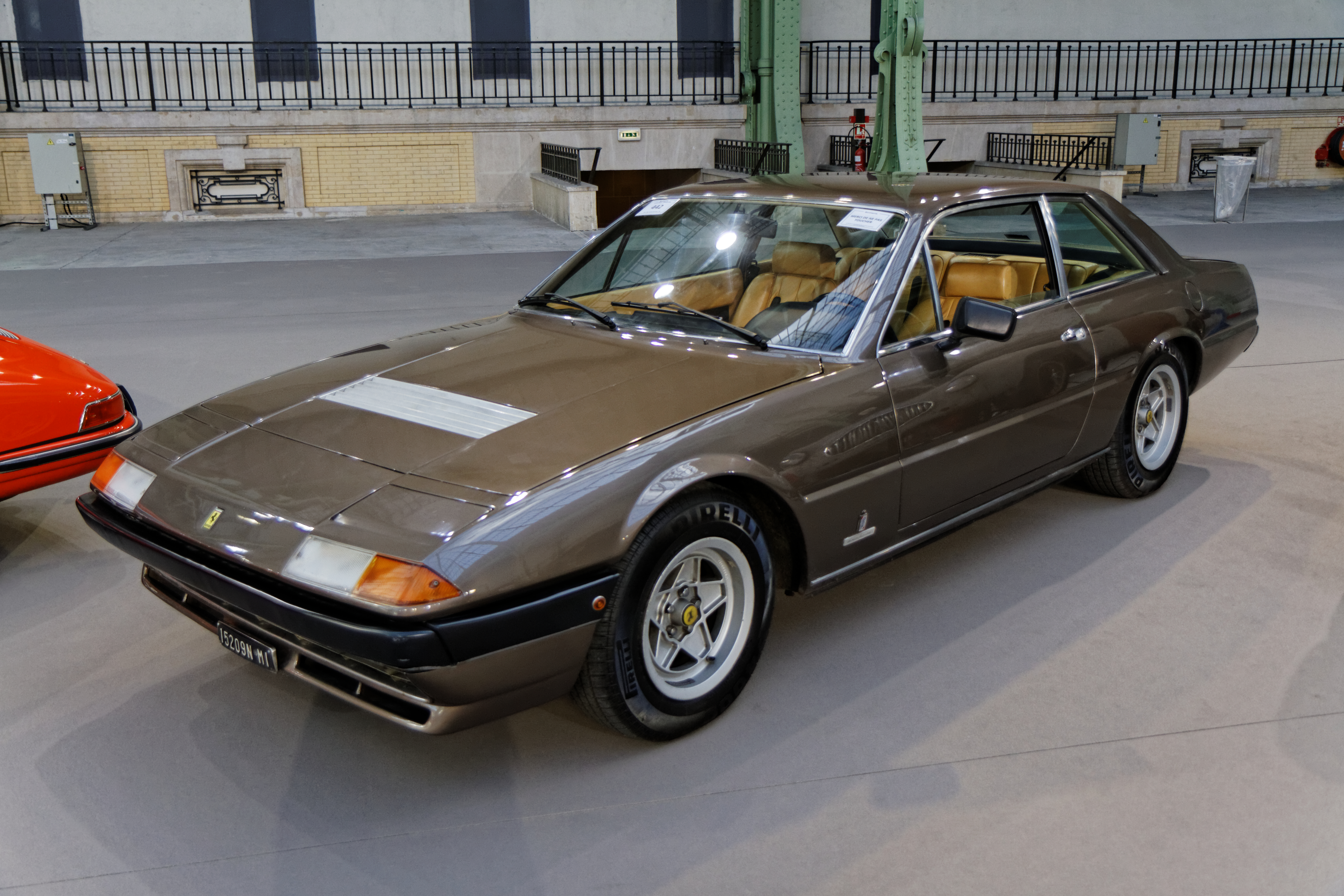
- Ferrari 400 GT

Overview
- Production: 1976–1979

Powertrain
- Engine: 4.8 L F 101 C V12
- Transmission: 5-speed manual 3-speed GM TH400 automatic

Dimensions
- Wheelbase: 2,700 mm (106.3 in)
- Length: 4,810 mm (189 in)
- Width: 1,796 mm (70.7 in)
- Height: 1,310 mm (51.6 in)
- Curb weight: 1,700 kg (3,748 lb) (empty)

At the 1976 Paris Motor Show Ferrari unveiled the replacement for the 365 GT4 2+2. The new 400 was offered in two models: 400 Automatic, using a GM THM400 3-speed automatic transmission, and 400 GT, using a five-speed transmission. The 400 Automatic was the first Ferrari to have an automatic transmission. The 365's V12 engine had been stroked to a displacement of 4,823 cc (4.8 L; 294.3 cu in) and given six 38 DCOE 110-111 Webers, and now produced 340 PS (250 kW). 0–60 mph took 7.1 seconds.

Other changes compared to the 365 GT4 2+2 included five-stud wheels to replace the knock-off hubs (Borrani spoked wheels were not offered anymore), a revised interior, the addition of a lip to the front spoiler, and double circular tail light assemblies instead of triple. A total of 502 examples were produced, 355 of which were Automatics and 147 GTs.

== 400 i ==
Ferrari 400 GT i Ferrari 400 Automatic i
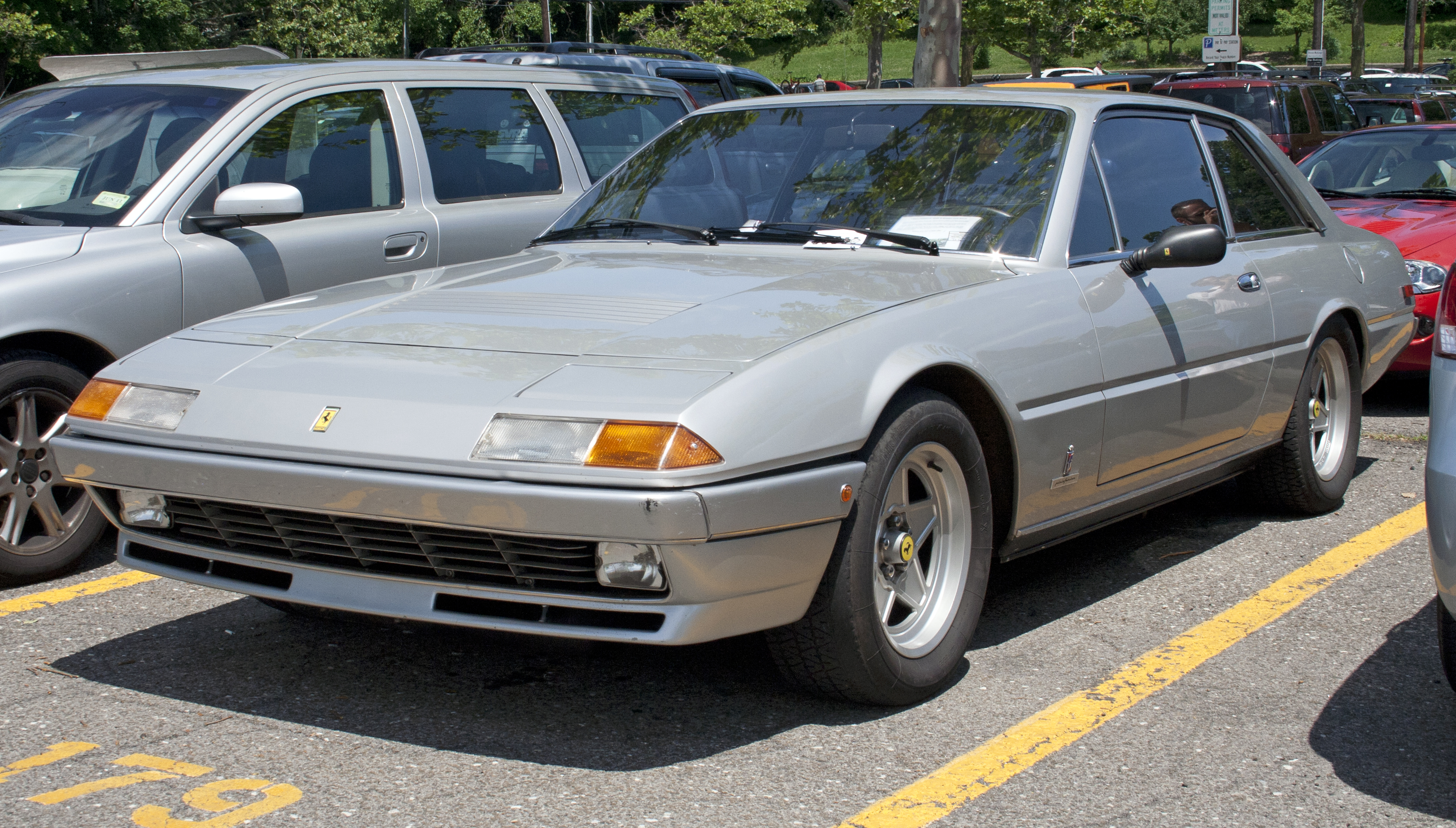
- "Series II" 400 GT i

Overview
- Production: 1979–1985

Powertrain
- Engine: 4.8 L F 101 D V12
- Transmission: 5-speed manual 3-speed automatic

Dimensions
- Wheelbase: 2,700 mm (106.3 in)
- Length: 4,810 mm (189 in)
- Width: 1,798 mm (70.8 in)
- Height: 1,314 mm (51.7 in)
- Curb weight: 1,830 kg (4,034 lb) (empty)

The carburetors on the 400 were replaced with Bosch K-Jetronic fuel injection in 1979. As in the smaller 308GTBi and 308GTSi, power was down to 310 PS (228 kW; 306 hp), but emissions were much improved, complying with U.S. standards. Top speed was 240 km/h (149 mph). Initially differences between the 400 and 400 i were limited to the fuel injected engine and an "i" badge on the tail.

Towards the end of 1982, the 400i was updated. New camshaft profiles and exhaust headers raised engine power to 315 PS (232 kW). The interior was significantly revised, gaining different upholstery, door panels, centre console and new electronic switchgear. On the exterior a narrower grille left the rectangular foglights exposed; the venting on the engine bonnet was changed from silver to body-colour. New wing mirrors were fitted, bearing a small Ferrari shield. Around the back the tail panel was body-coloured instead of matte black, and foglamps were fitted in the bumper. Lower profile Michelin TRX tyres were adopted, on metric sized wheels. A total of 1305 examples were produced, 883 Automatics and 422 GTs.

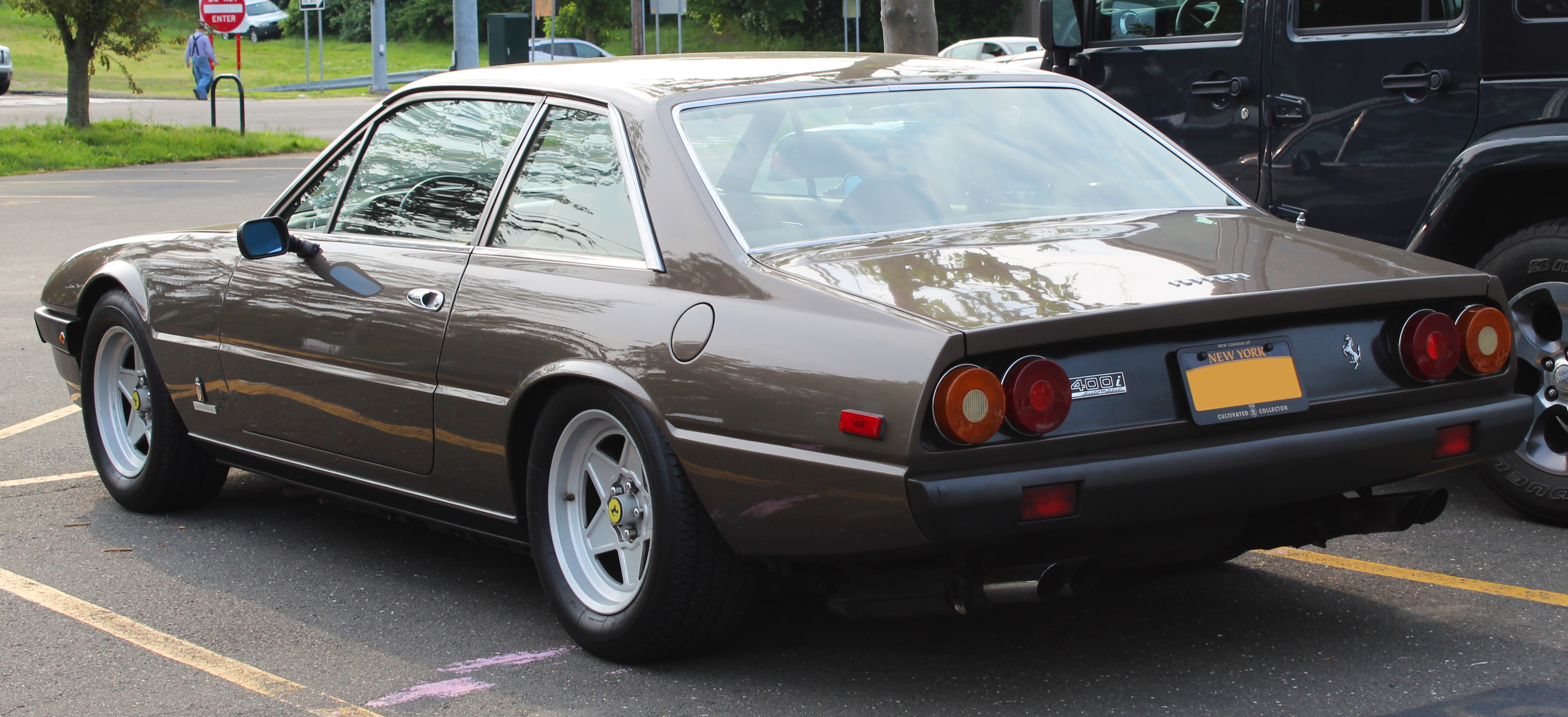
400i rear view

== 412 ==
Ferrari 412
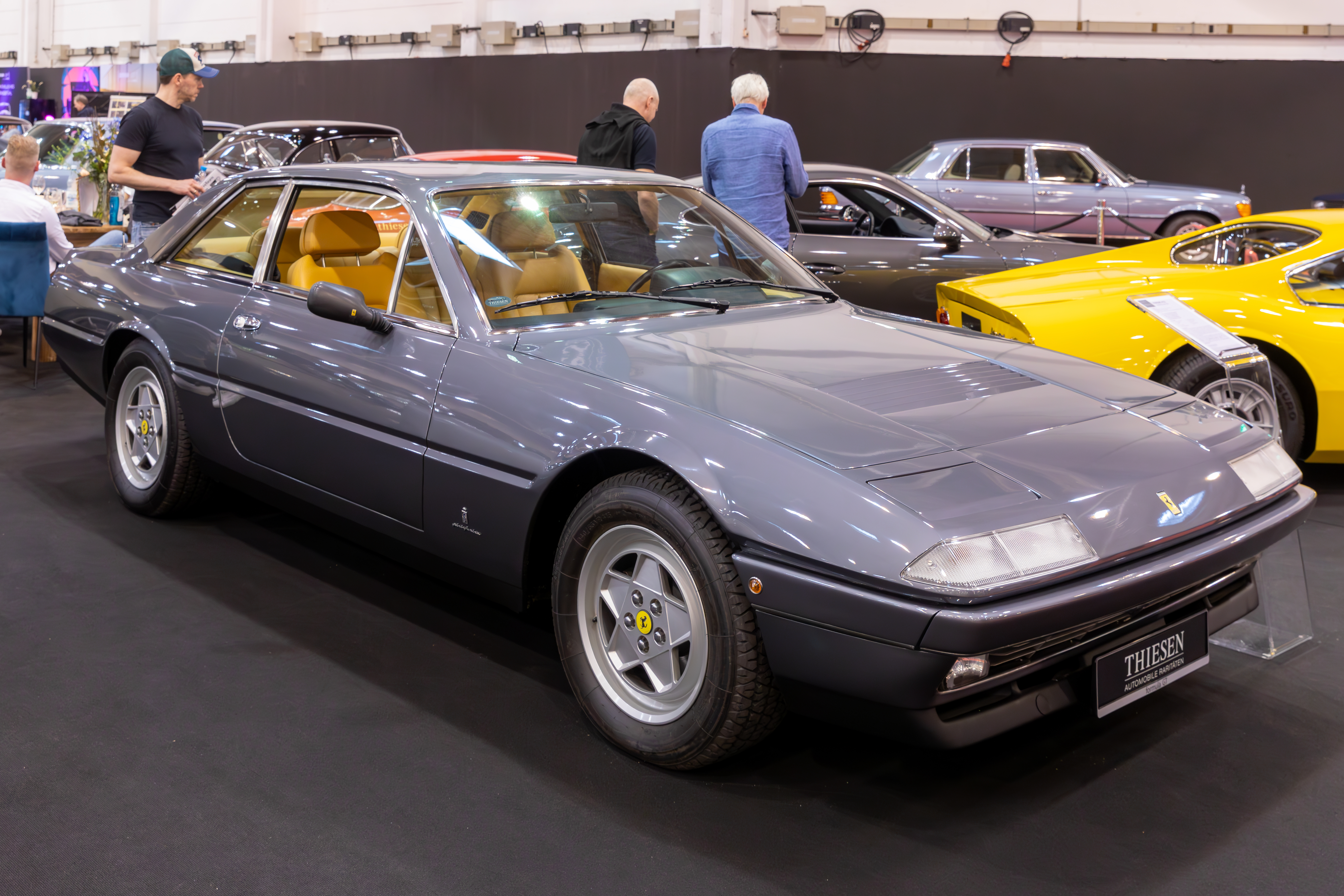

Overview
- Production: 1985–1989

Powertrain
- Engine: 4943 cc F 101 E V12
- Transmission: 5-speed manual 3-speed automatic

Dimensions
- Wheelbase: 2,700 mm (106.3 in)
- Length: 4,810 mm (189 in)
- Width: 1,798 mm (70.8 in)
- Height: 1,314 mm (51.7 in)
- Curb weight: 1,805–1,810 kg (3,979–3,990 lb)

In 1985 further improvements were made to the series, with the launch of the Ferrari 412 (chassis Tipo F 101 EL) in April that year. The engine was bored 1 mm, for an increase in displacement to 4,943 cc (4.9 L; 301.6 cu in) — hence the name change to 412, representing the single cylinder displacement in cubic centimetres. Both the manual and automatic transmissions were retained, but exterior badging no longer denoted the transmission type fitted. Bosch ABS was offered, a first for Ferrari. The body was altered, with a raised rear deck granting more luggage space. Pininfarina made many subtle tweaks to modernize the exterior. The bumpers were body-coloured; at the front there was a deeper spoiler, at the rear a black valance incorporated the foglamps and exhaust pipes. Side window trim was changed from chrome to black. The flat-faced wheels were new and fitted with TRX tires.

A total of 576 examples were made, of which 270 were manual. Production ended in 1989 without a direct successor being immediately launched; the mid-engined Mondial remained the only Ferrari offering 2+2 seating. In 1992, after a three-year hiatus, the classic front-engine V12 2+2 grand tourer returned with the 456.

A black 1987 model of the 412 was used in the 2006 independent film Daft Punk's Electroma. The car used in filming was later auctioned for charity, with the 'HUMAN' license plates (in reference to the duo's album 'Human After All', released a year before) signed by Thomas Bangalter and Guy-Manuel de Homem-Christo, the directors of the film.

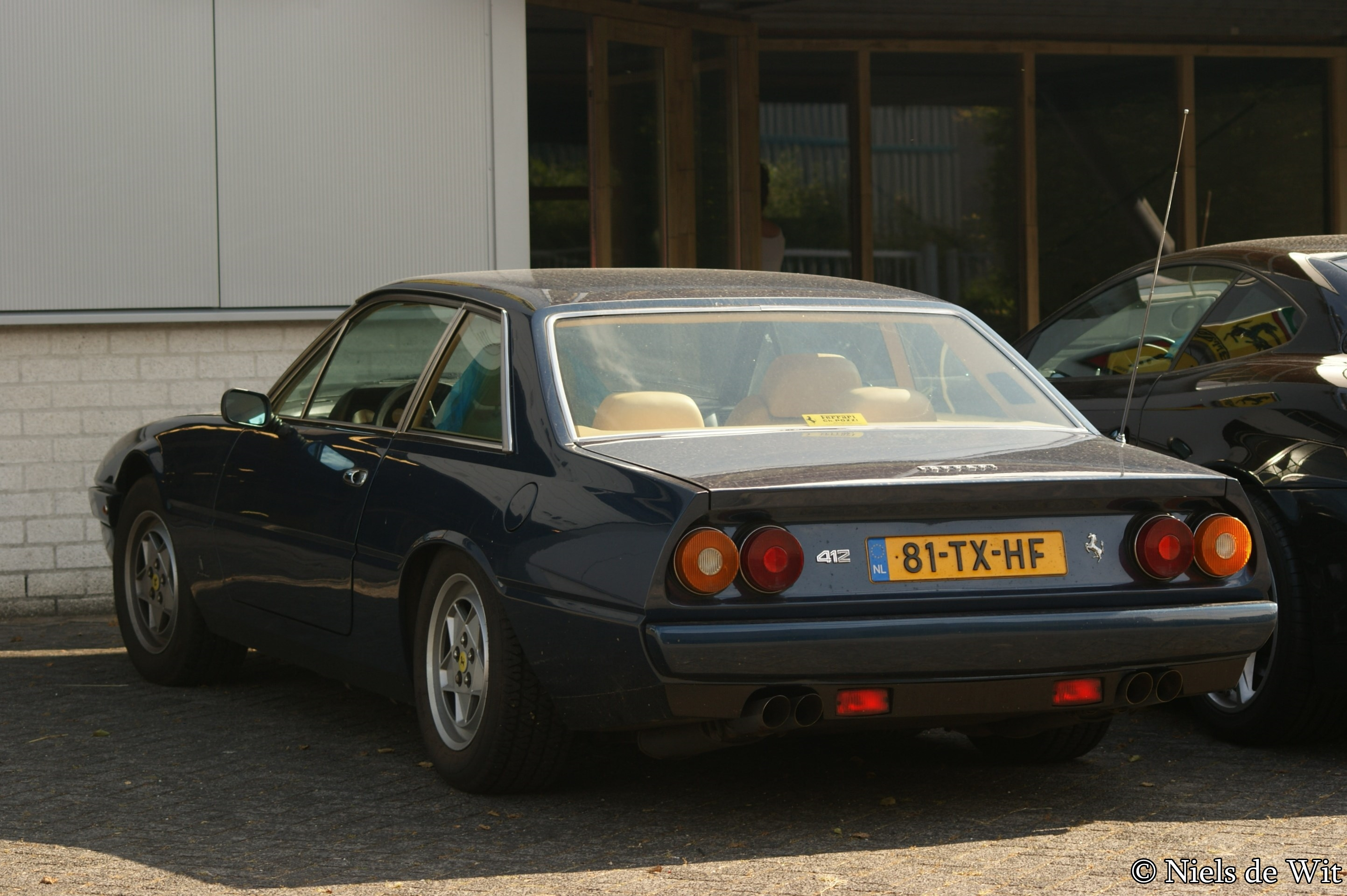
Four round tail lights had replaced six

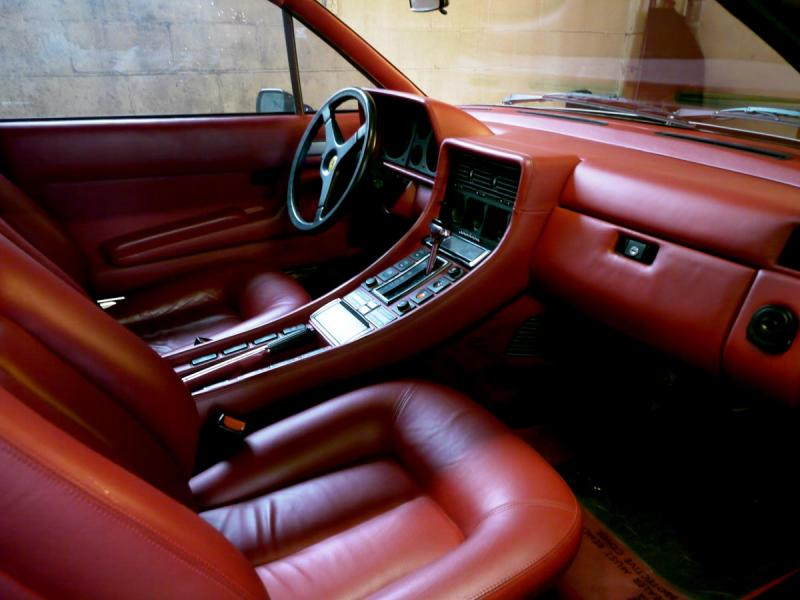
Leather was used throughout the interior of an automatic 412

== Legacy ==
Today, its sleek, Pininfarina-designed lines and relatively limited production numbers have made many enthusiasts consider it a classic. It has not been universally admired however, and is listed at #18 in the BBC's book of "Crap Cars" and Jeremy Clarkson on Top Gear described it as "awful in every way". However, there have been many other favorable articles about the 400 series in the motoring press, including an outlying view expressed by UK motoring journalist L. J. K. Setright in CAR magazine in August 1984, who described it as "one of the few most beautiful, and one of the two most elegant, bodies ever to leave the lead of Pininfarina's pencilling vision".
