= Ferrari Colombo engine =

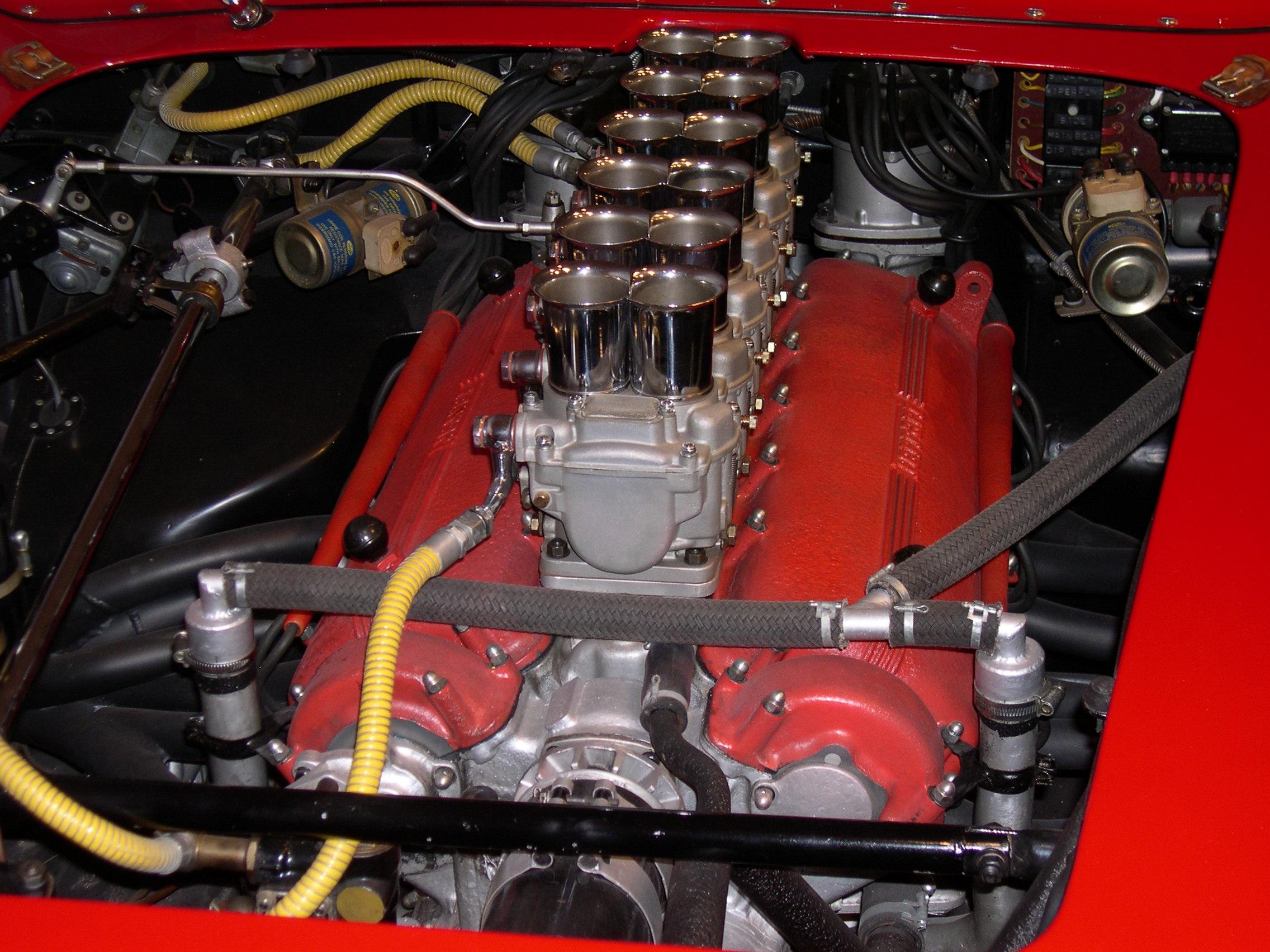
- Colombo engine in a 1961 250TR Spider

Overview
- Manufacturer: Ferrari
- Production: 1947–1988

Layout
- Configuration: 60° V12
- Displacement: 1.5 L (1,497 cc); 2.0 L (1,995 cc); 2.3 L (2,341 cc); 2.6 L (2,563 cc); 3.0 L (2,953 cc); 3.3 L (3,286 cc); 4.0 L (3,967 cc); 4.4 L (4,390 cc); 4.8 L (4,823 cc); 4.9 L (4,943 cc)
- Cylinder bore: 55 mm (2.2 in); 60 mm (2.4 in); 65 mm (2.6 in); 68 mm (2.7 in); 73 mm (2.9 in); 77 mm (3.0 in); 81 mm (3.2 in); 82 mm (3.2 in)
- Piston stroke: 52.5 mm (2.1 in); 58.8 mm (2.3 in); 71 mm (2.8 in); 78 mm (3.1 in)
- Cylinder block material: Aluminium
- Cylinder head material: Aluminium
- Valvetrain: SOHC, 24-valve DOHC, 24-valve
- Compression ratio: 7.5:1 - 9.8:1

Combustion
- Supercharger: Roots-type (in some versions)
- Fuel system: Weber carburetor Bosch K-Jetronic FI
- Fuel type: Petrol
- Oil system: Wet sump Dry sump
- Cooling system: Water-cooled

Output
- Power output: 116–395 hp (87–295 kW; 118–400 PS)
- Torque output: 90–240 lb⋅ft (122–325 N⋅m)

Chronology
- Successor: Ferrari Lampredi V12 engine Ferrari flat-12 engine Ferrari F116 engine

The Ferrari Colombo engine is a petrol fueled, water cooled, carburetted 60° V12 engine designed by Gioacchino Colombo and produced in numerous iterations by Italian automaker Ferrari between 1947 and 1988. The maker's first homegrown engine, its linear successor is the Lampredi V12, which it far outlived, the last Lampredi being made in 1959.

Colombo, who had previously designed Alfa Romeos for Enzo Ferrari, placed bore centres at 90 mm apart, allowing for significant expansion. Displacements ranged from the diminutive 1,497 cc (1.5 L; 91.4 cu in) debut that powered the 125S racer to the 4,943 cc (4.9 L; 301.6 cu in) unit in the 1986 412i grand tourer. Significant updates were made in 1963 for the 330 series, featuring a redesigned block with wider, 94 mm, bore spacing.

Enzo Ferrari had long admired the V12 engines of Packard, Auto Union, and Alfa Romeo (where he was long employed), but his first car, the 1940 Auto Avio Costruzioni 815, used a Fiat derived straight-8. Development of the V12 Colombo engine continued long after Colombo had been replaced by Aurelio Lampredi as the company's marquee engine designer. Although the Lampredi V12 was a real force for the company, it was Colombo's engine which powered Ferrari to the forefront of high-performance automobiles through the 1950s and 1960s.

== 125 ==
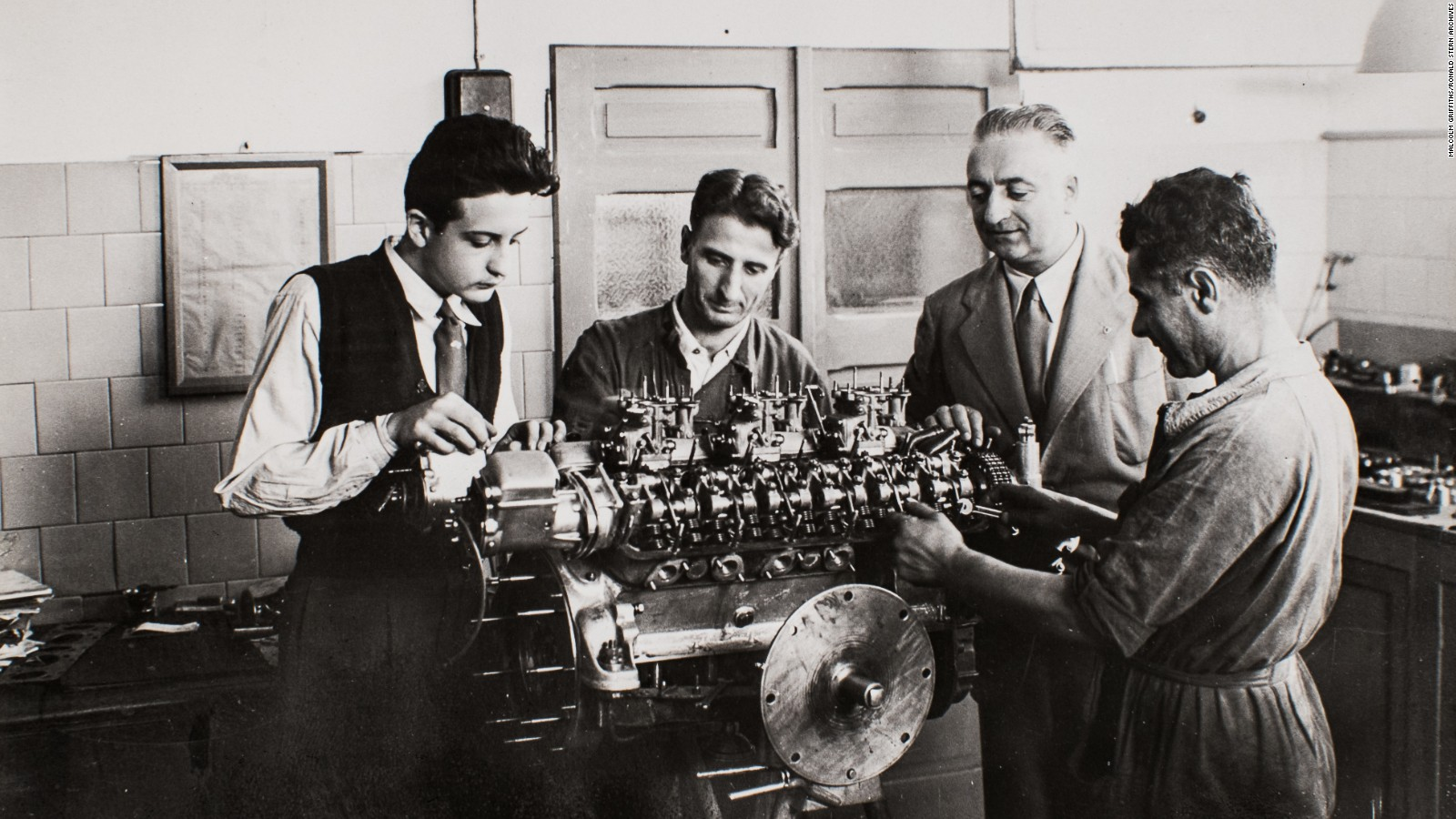
Enzo Ferrari and his engine department work on the 125 S engine in 1947

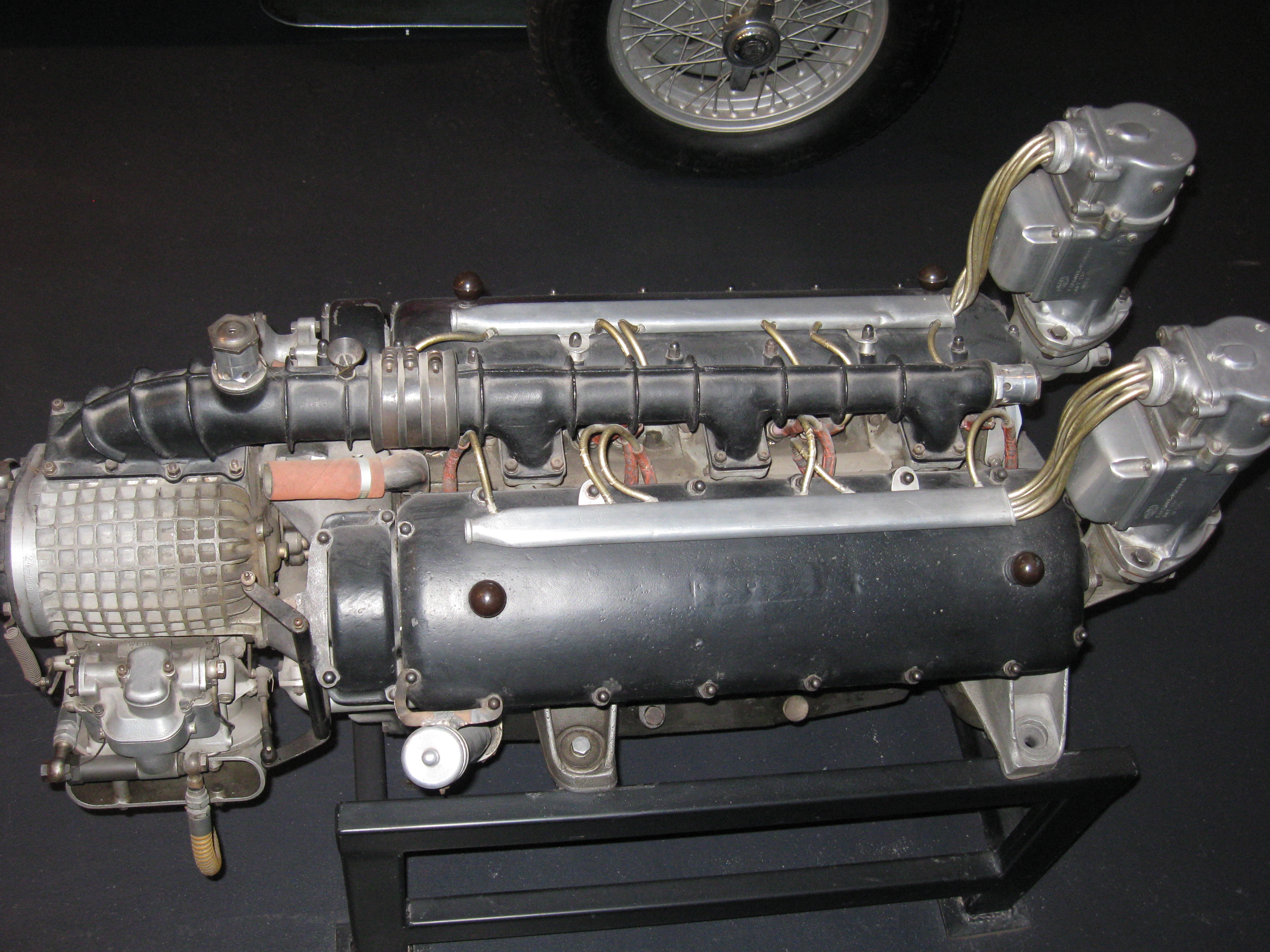
The V12 engine used in the 125 F1 (early version)

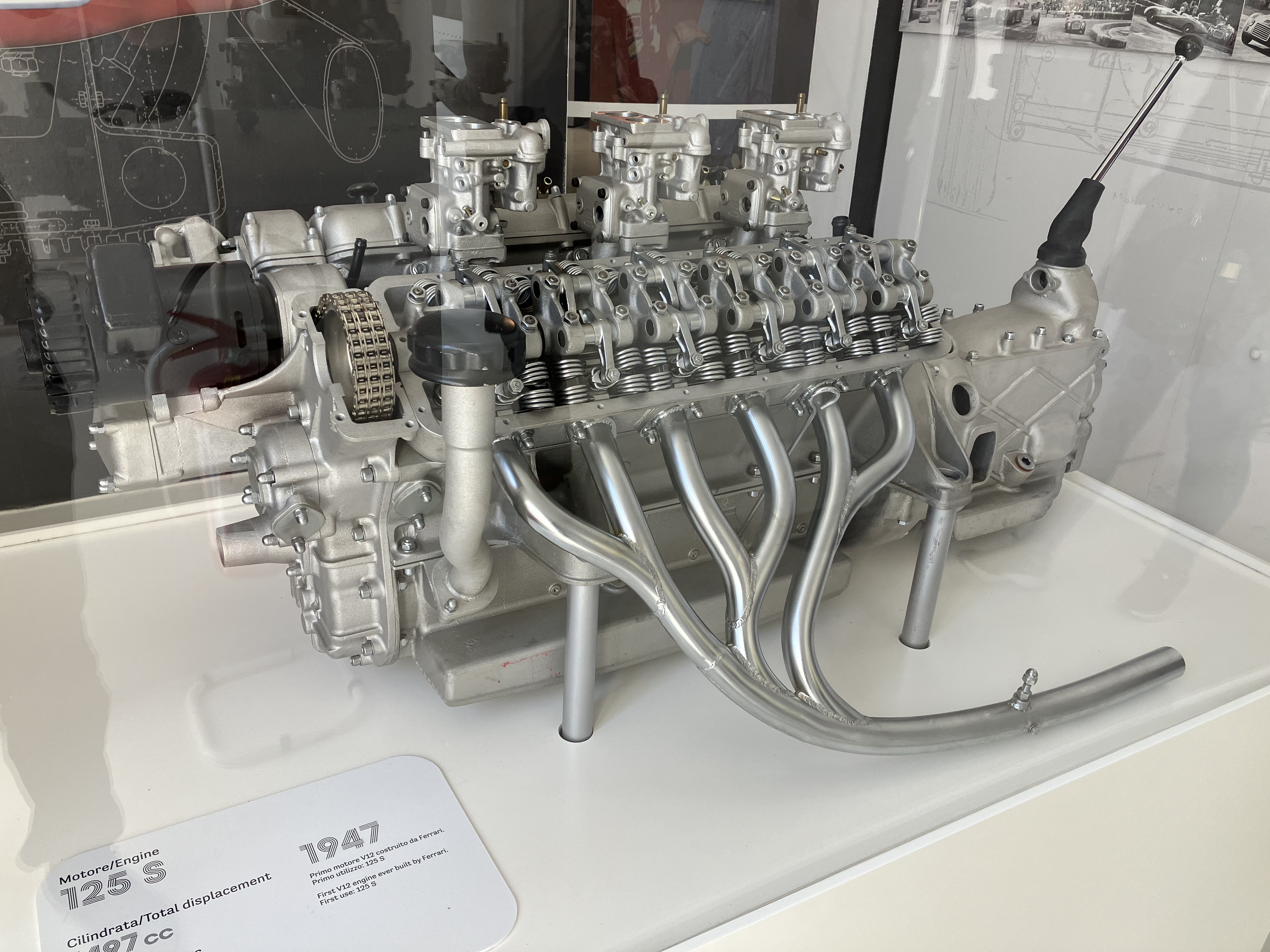
125 S at the Museo Casa Enzo Ferrari

The first Ferrari-designed engine was the 1,496.77 cc (1.5 L; 91.3 cu in) V12 125, the work of Gioacchino Colombo and assistants Giuseppe Busso and Luigi Bazzi. The engine's name, and the car powered by it, the 125 S sports racer, were derived from the tiny 124.73 cc (7.6 cu in) 55 mm (2.17 in) by 52.5 mm (2.07 in) cylinders. The single overhead camshaft 60° V design had one cam on each cylinder bank, two valves per cylinder, and three 30DCF Weber carburetors. A 7.5:1 compression ratio yielded 118 PS (116 hp; 87 kW) at 6800 rpm. First appearing May 11, 1947, the engine allowed the company to claim six victories in 14 races that year.

Colombo and Ferrari had designed the engine with Formula One regulations in mind, and introduced it the next year in the company's first F1 car, the 125 F1. This time, it was supercharged, in accordance with F1 dictates, for a total output of 230 PS (227 hp; 169 kW) at 7,000 rpm. However, the single-stage Roots-type supercharger was incapable of producing the high-end power required to compete with the strong eight-cylinder Alfa Romeo 158 and four-cylinder Maserati 4CLT. Nevertheless, strong driving and a nimble chassis allowed the company to place third in its first outing, at the Valentino Grand Prix on September 5, 1948 and the company persevered in racing.

For 1949, the engine was further modified with dual overhead camshafts (though still two valves per cylinder) and a two-stage supercharger. This combination gave the car better top-end performance and the resulting 280 PS (276 hp; 206 kW) gave it five Grand Prix wins. Development continued the following year, but the problematic superchargers were dropped in favor of larger displacement and Lampredi's 275 engine superseded the original Colombo design.

Applications:

- 1947 Ferrari 125 S — 118 PS (116 hp; 87 kW)
- 1948 Ferrari 125 F1 — Single supercharger, 230 PS (227 hp; 169 kW)
- 1949–1950 Ferrari 125 F1 — Dual-stage supercharger, 280 PS (276 hp; 206 kW)

== 58.8 mm stroke ==
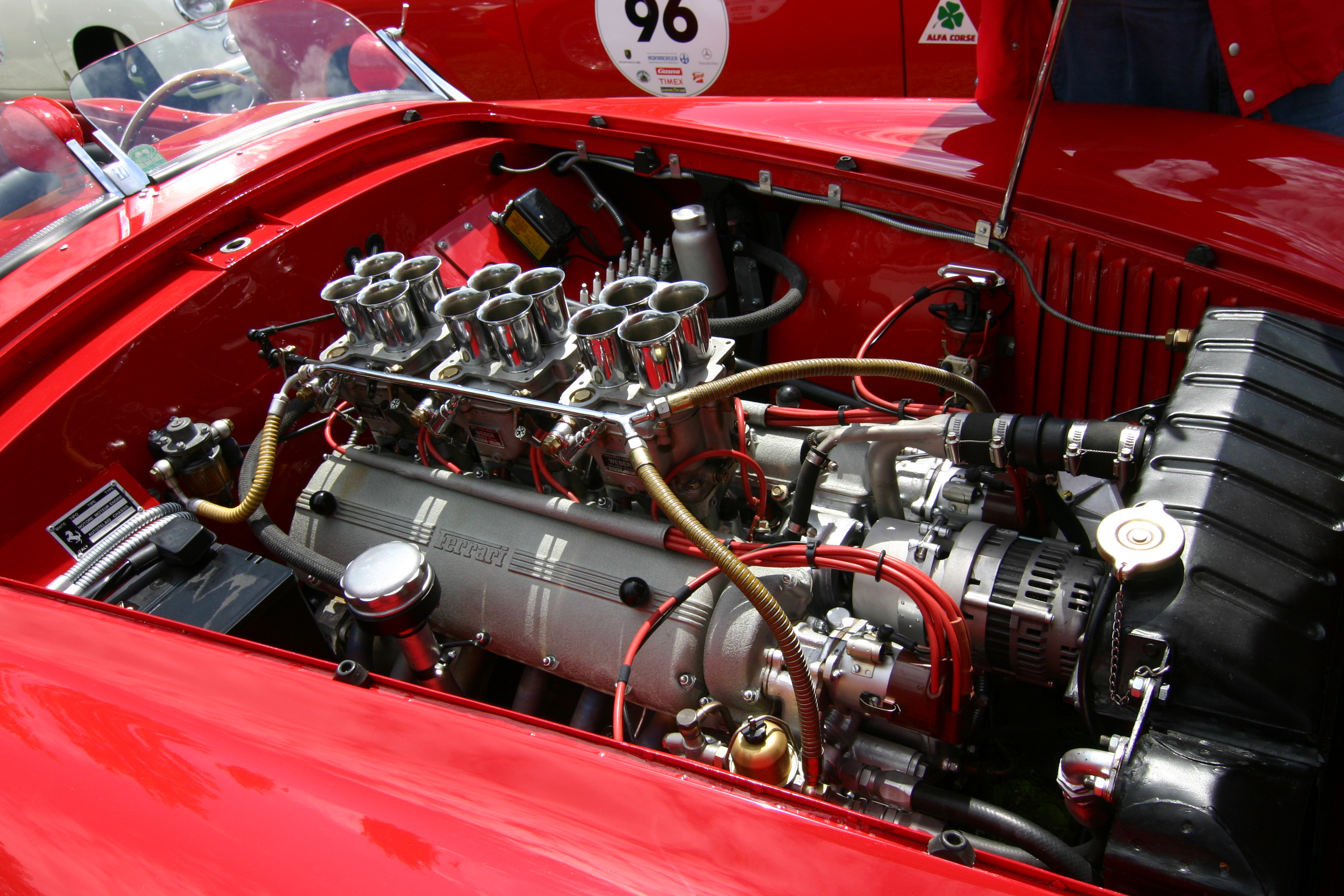
Ferrari 212 2.6 L engine

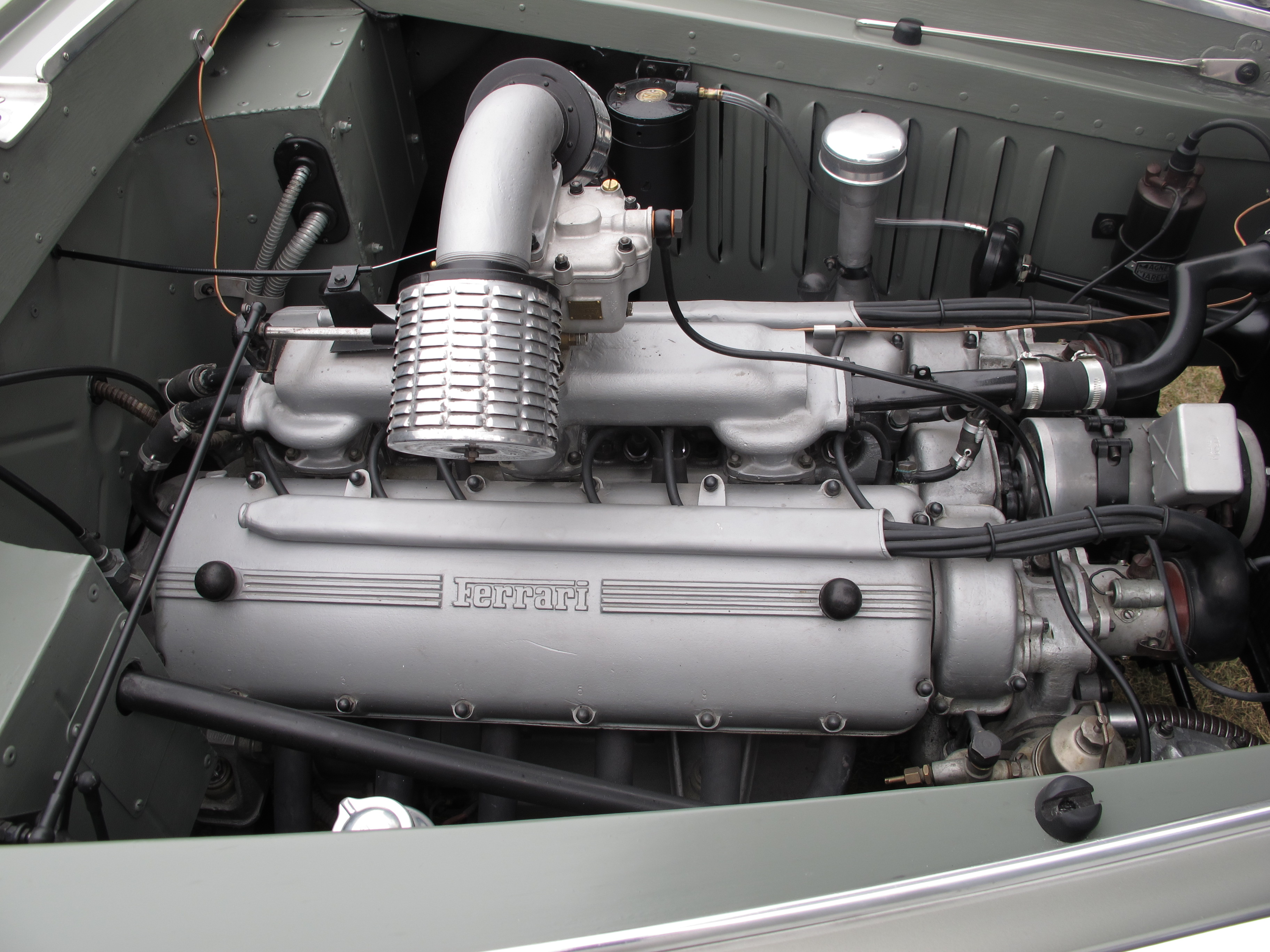
Early road cars had a single carburetor and log manifold as the standard option.

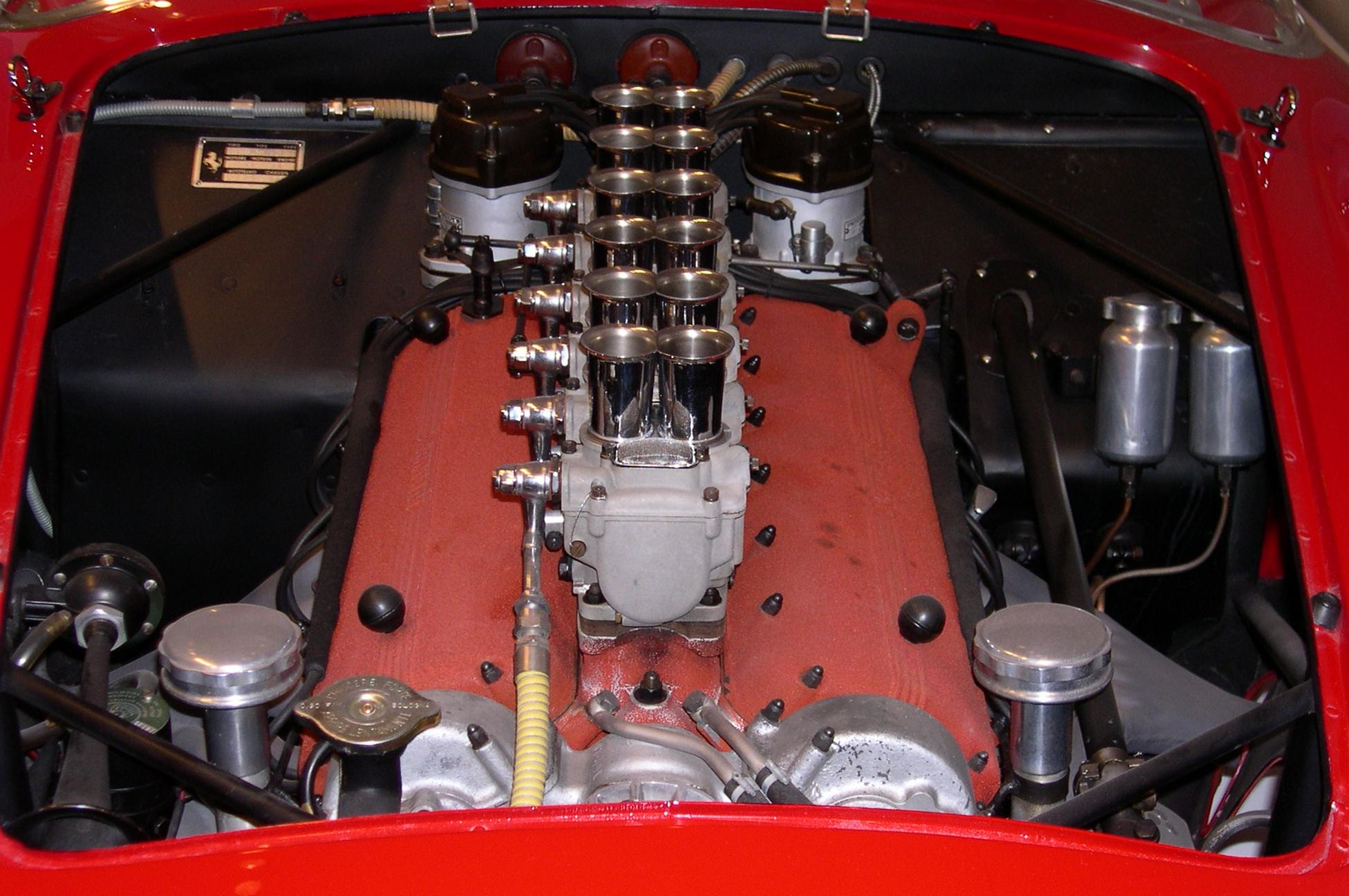
Colombo Testa Rossa engine in a 1958 250TR

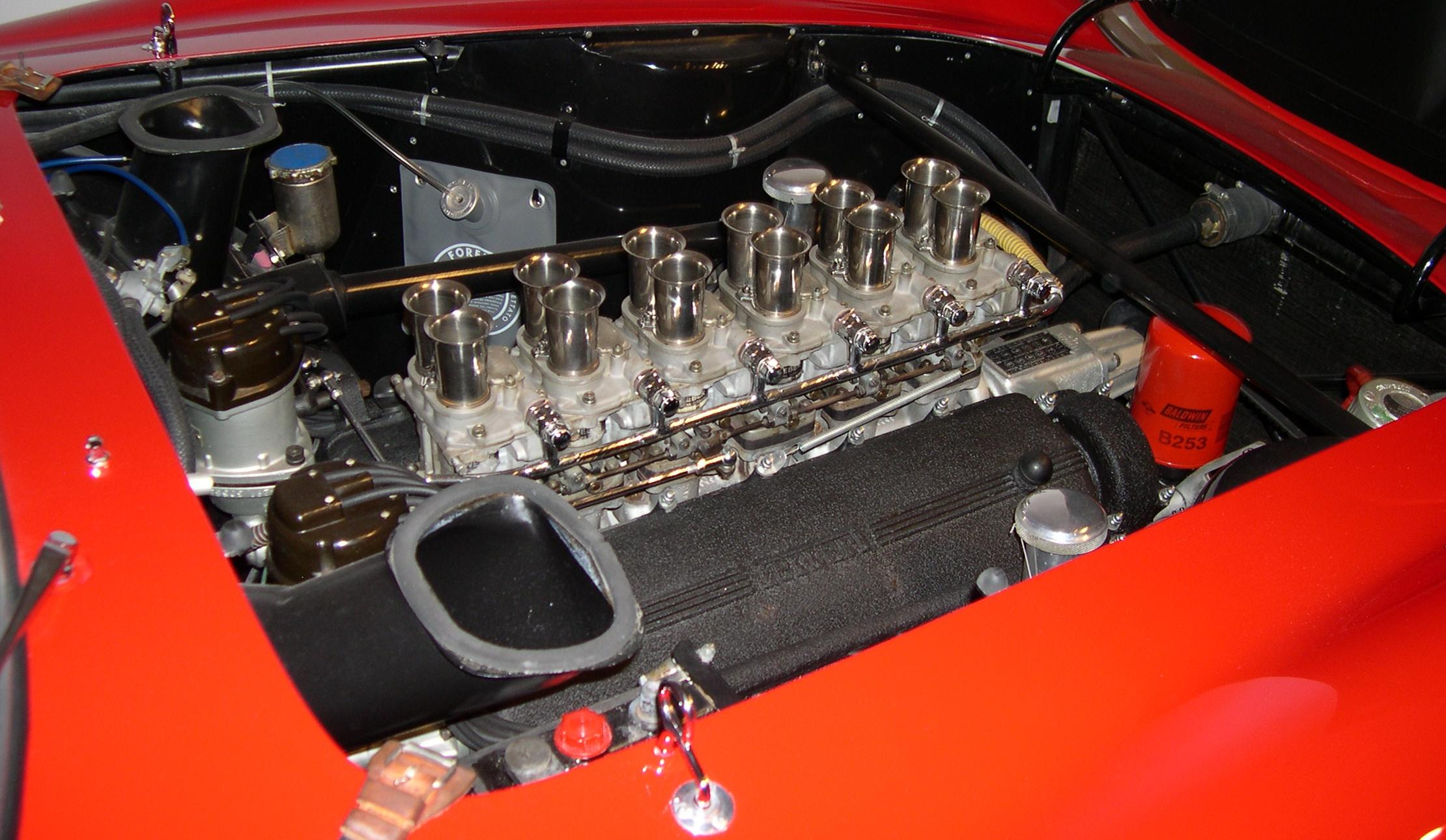
Colombo engine in a 1962 250 GTO

The early 166, 195, and 212 cars used Colombo V12s of varying sizes. All shared the same 58.8 mm (2.31 in) stroke, with 60, 65, and 68 mm (2.68 in) bores giving displacements of 1,995 cc (2.0 L; 121.7 cu in) in the 166, 2,341 cc (2.3 L; 142.9 cu in) in the 195 and 2,563 cc (2.6 L; 156.4 cu in) in the 212, respectively. Output ranged from 105 PS (104 hp; 77 kW) to 165 PS (163 hp; 121 kW).

=== 250 ===
One of the most common Colombo engines is the 250, which debuted in 1952 in the 250S and lasted through the 1963 330 America. It used a 73 mm (2.87 in) bore with the common Colombo stroke of 58.8 mm (2.31 in) for a total of 2,953 cc (3.0 L).

Beginning with the famous 250 TR, "Testa Rossa" racing car, Ferrari began a new series of modifications to the Colombo 250 engine. The spark plugs were moved to the outside of the cylinder head, near the exhausts. This enabled Ferrari to introduce separate individual intake ports to use with the six two barrel Weber carburetors. Four cylinder head bolts per cylinder were introduced (instead of three) to cope with the added power.

These changes eventually were incorporated into the Ferrari road cars, beginning with the 250 GT SWB and the 250 GT Series II Pininfarina cars.

=== 275 ===
The final 58.8 mm (2.31 in) Colombo Ferrari was the 275. It used a 3,286 cc (3.3 L; 200.5 cu in) variant of the V12 with a wide 77 mm (3.03 in) bore for up to 300 PS (296 hp; 221 kW).

== 330 ==
The 1960 400 Superamerica replaced the previous model's Lampredi engine with a 3,967 cc (4.0 L; 242.1 cu in) Colombo. It diverged from the standard 58.8 mm (2.31 in) stroke with a 71 mm (2.80 in) stroke and 77 mm (3.03 in) bore. Output was 340 to 400 PS (335 to 395 hp; 250 to 294 kW) with triple Weber carburetors.

Although the 1963 330 series also used a 3,967 cc (4.0 L; 242.1 cu in) engine with the same bore and stroke as the 400 Superamerica, this 300 PS (221 kW; 296 hp) engine was quite different. It used a wider bore spacing, paving the way for future displacement increases. The spark plugs were moved and a new water pump was used. The dynamo on the prior versions was replaced by an alternator.

== Four-cam ==
The Colombo V12 was substantially reworked for 1967's 275 GTB/4. It still used two valves per cylinder, but dual overhead cams were now used as well. In a departure from previous Ferrari designs, the valve angle was reduced three degrees to 54° for a more-compact head. The dual camshafts also allowed the valves to be aligned "correctly" (perpendicular to the camshaft) instead of offset as in SOHC Ferraris. It was a dry-sump design with a huge 16 L (17 US qt) capacity. The engine retained the bore and stroke dimensions of the 275 model for 3,286 cc (3.3 L; 200.5 cu in) of displacement. Output was 330 PS (325 hp; 243 kW) at 8000 rpm and 240 lb⋅ft (325 N⋅m) of torque at 6000 rpm with six 40 DCN 9 Weber carburetors.

== 365 ==
The 330 Colombo engine was enlarged with an 81 mm (3.19 in) bore to 4,390.35 cc (4.4 L; 267.9 cu in) for 1966's 365 California, retaining single overhead cams and wet sump lubrication. A reworked engine with four camshafts was used in the GT/4 models. The 365 GTB/4 Daytona was the only 365 engined car featuring dry sump lubrication.

Applications:

- 1966–1967 365 California
- 1968–1970 365 GTC
- 1968–1972 365 GT 2+2
- 1968–1973 365 GTB/4 Daytona, 365 GTS/4 Daytona
- 1969 365 GTS
- 1971–1972 365 GTC/4
- 1972–1976 365 GT4 2+2

== 400, 412 ==
The wet sump, four-cam, 365 Colombo engine was enlarged again to 4,823.16 cc (4.8 L; 294.3 cu in) for 1976's 400 with the same 81 mm (3.19 in) bore and a 78 mm (3.07 in) stroke. The carburetors were replaced with Bosch K-Jetronic fuel injection in 1979. In 1986 the engine was bored to 82 mm (3.23 in) giving a displacement of 4,943.03 cc (4.9 L; 301.6 cu in).

Applications:

- 1976–1979 400
- 1979–1985 400i
- 1986–1988 412i

== Performance ==
Engine Tipo	Displacement	Bore x Stroke	Years	Applications	Power	Torque
112	2.95 L (2,953.21 cc)	73 mm × 58.8 mm (2.874 in × 2.315 in) 246.1 cc (15.02 cu in)	1954-1955	250 Europa GT	220 PS (217 bhp; 162 kW) at 7000 RPM	265 N⋅m (195 lb⋅ft) at 5000 RPM
128	2.95 L (2,953.21 cc)	73 mm × 58.8 mm (2.874 in × 2.315 in) 246.1 cc (15.02 cu in)	1955-1964	250 GT Coupé, 250 GT Cabriolet, 250 GT California, 250 GT 2+2	240 PS (237 bhp; 177 kW) at 7000 RPM	265 N⋅m (195 lb⋅ft) at 5000 RPM
168	2.95 L (2,953.21 cc)	73 mm × 58.8 mm (2.874 in × 2.315 in) 246.1 cc (15.02 cu in)	1959-1964	250 GT Berlinetta, 250 GT California, 250 GT Berlinetta Lusso	240 PS (237 bhp; 177 kW) at 7000 RPM	265 N⋅m (195 lb⋅ft) at 5500 RPM
163	3.97 L (3,967.45 cc)	77 mm × 71 mm (3.031 in × 2.795 in) 330.6 cc (20.17 cu in)	1959-1964	400 Superamerica	340 PS (335 bhp; 250 kW) at 6750 RPM	412 N⋅m (304 lb⋅ft) at 4000 RPM
209	3.97 L (3,967.45 cc)	77 mm × 71 mm (3.031 in × 2.795 in) 330.6 cc (20.17 cu in)	1966-1968	330 America, 330 GT 2+2, 330 GTC, 330 GTS	300 PS (296 bhp; 221 kW) at 6600 RPM	325 N⋅m (240 lb⋅ft) at 5000 RPM
208	4.96 L (4,963.01 cc)	88 mm × 68 mm (3.465 in × 2.677 in) 413.6 cc (25.24 cu in)	1964-1966	500 Superfast	400 PS (395 bhp; 294 kW) at 6500 RPM	476 N⋅m (351 lb⋅ft) at 4750 RPM
213	3.29 L (3,285.72 cc)	77 mm × 58.8 mm (3.031 in × 2.315 in) 273.8 cc (16.71 cu in)	1964-1966	275 GTS	260 PS (256 bhp; 191 kW) at 7000 RPM	294 N⋅m (217 lb⋅ft) at 5000 RPM
213	3.29 L (3,285.72 cc)	77 mm × 58.8 mm (3.031 in × 2.315 in) 273.8 cc (16.71 cu in)	1964-1966	275 GTB	280 PS (276 bhp; 206 kW) at 7600 RPM	294 N⋅m (217 lb⋅ft) at 5000 RPM
213	3.29 L (3,285.72 cc)	77 mm × 58.8 mm (3.031 in × 2.315 in) 273.8 cc (16.71 cu in)	1964-1966	275 GTB 6 Carburetor	290 PS (286 bhp; 213 kW) at 7600 RPM	294 N⋅m (217 lb⋅ft) at 5000 RPM
226	3.29 L (3,285.72 cc)	77 mm × 58.8 mm (3.031 in × 2.315 in) 273.8 cc (16.71 cu in)	1966-1968	275 GTB/4	300 PS (296 bhp; 221 kW) at 8000 RPM	294 N⋅m (217 lb⋅ft) at 6000 RPM
217	4.39 L (4,390.35 cc)	81 mm × 71 mm (3.189 in × 2.795 in) 365.9 cc (22.33 cu in)	1966-1967	365 California	320 PS (316 bhp; 235 kW) at 6400 RPM	363 N⋅m (268 lb⋅ft) at 5000 RPM
245	4.39 L (4,390.35 cc)	81 mm × 71 mm (3.189 in × 2.795 in) 365.9 cc (22.33 cu in)	1967-1971	365 GT 2+2, 365 GTC, 365 GTS	320 PS (316 bhp; 235 kW) at 6400 RPM	363 N⋅m (268 lb⋅ft) at 5000 RPM
251	4.39 L (4,390.35 cc)	81 mm × 71 mm (3.189 in × 2.795 in) 365.9 cc (22.33 cu in)	1968-1973	365 GTB/4, 365 GTS/4	352 PS (347 bhp; 259 kW) at 7500 RPM	432 N⋅m (319 lb⋅ft) at 5500 RPM
F 101 AC	4.39 L (4,390.35 cc)	81 mm × 71 mm (3.189 in × 2.795 in) 365.9 cc (22.33 cu in)	1971-1973	365 GTC/4, 365 GT4 2+2	340 PS (335 bhp; 250 kW) at 6800 RPM	422 N⋅m (311 lb⋅ft) at 4600 RPM
F 101 AC	4.39 L (4,390.35 cc)	81 mm × 71 mm (3.189 in × 2.795 in) 365.9 cc (22.33 cu in)	1973-1976	365 GT4 2+2	320 PS (316 bhp; 235 kW) at 6200 RPM	432 N⋅m (319 lb⋅ft) at 4000 RPM
F 101 C	4.82 L (4,823.21 cc)	81 mm × 78 mm (3.189 in × 3.071 in) 401.9 cc (24.53 cu in)	1976-1979	400	340 PS (335 bhp; 250 kW) at 6500 RPM	471 N⋅m (347 lb⋅ft) at 3600 RPM
F 101 D	4.82 L (4,823.21 cc)	81 mm × 78 mm (3.189 in × 3.071 in) 401.9 cc (24.53 cu in)	1979-1982	400i	310 PS (306 bhp; 228 kW) at 6400 RPM	392 N⋅m (289 lb⋅ft) at 4200 RPM
F 101 D	4.82 L (4,823.21 cc)	81 mm × 78 mm (3.189 in × 3.071 in) 401.9 cc (24.53 cu in)	1982-1985	400i	315 PS (311 bhp; 232 kW) at 6400 RPM	412 N⋅m (304 lb⋅ft) at 4200 RPM
F 101 E	4.94 L (4,943.03 cc)	82 mm × 78 mm (3.228 in × 3.071 in) 411.9 cc (25.14 cu in)	1985-1989	412	340 PS (335 bhp; 250 kW) at 6000 RPM	451 N⋅m (333 lb⋅ft) at 4200 RPM

Engine Tipo	Displacement	Bore x Stroke	Years	Applications	Power	Torque
128LM	2.95 L (2,953.21 cc)	73 mm × 58.8 mm (2.874 in × 2.315 in) 246.1 cc (15.02 cu in)	1957-1958	250 TR	300 PS (296 bhp; 221 kW) at 7200 RPM	
128LM	2.95 L (2,953.21 cc)	73 mm × 58.8 mm (2.874 in × 2.315 in) 246.1 cc (15.02 cu in)	1959-1960	250 TR/59, 250 TRI/60	305 PS (301 bhp; 224 kW) at 7400 RPM	
128LM	2.95 L (2,953.21 cc)	73 mm × 58.8 mm (2.874 in × 2.315 in) 246.1 cc (15.02 cu in)	1961	250 TRI/61	315 PS (311 bhp; 232 kW) at 7500 RPM	
210	2.95 L (2,953.21 cc)	73 mm × 58.8 mm (2.874 in × 2.315 in) 246.1 cc (15.02 cu in)	1963	250 P	310 PS (306 bhp; 228 kW) at 7500 RPM	
128LM/63	3.29 L (3,285.72 cc)	77 mm × 58.8 mm (3.031 in × 2.315 in) 273.8 cc (16.71 cu in)	1963-1965	250 LM, 275 P	320 PS (316 bhp; 235 kW) at 7700 RPM	
215	3.29 L (3,285.72 cc)	77 mm × 58.8 mm (3.031 in × 2.315 in) 273.8 cc (16.71 cu in)	1965	275 P2	350 PS (345 bhp; 257 kW) at 8500 RPM	
163LM	3.97 L (3,967.45 cc)	77 mm × 71 mm (3.031 in × 2.795 in) 330.6 cc (20.17 cu in)	1962-1963	330 TRI/LM, 330 GTO, 330 LMB	390 PS (385 bhp; 287 kW) at 7500 RPM	
163C	3.97 L (3,967.45 cc)	77 mm × 71 mm (3.031 in × 2.795 in) 330.6 cc (20.17 cu in)	1964	330 P	370 PS (365 bhp; 272 kW) at 7200 RPM	
209	3.97 L (3,967.45 cc)	77 mm × 71 mm (3.031 in × 2.795 in) 330.6 cc (20.17 cu in)	1965	330 P2	410 PS (404 bhp; 302 kW) at 8000 RPM	
216	3.97 L (3,967.45 cc)	77 mm × 71 mm (3.031 in × 2.795 in) 330.6 cc (20.17 cu in)	1966-1967	330 P3, 412 P	420 PS (414 bhp; 309 kW) at 8000 RPM	
237	3.97 L (3,967.45 cc)	77 mm × 71 mm (3.031 in × 2.795 in) 330.6 cc (20.17 cu in)	1967	330 P4	450 PS (444 bhp; 331 kW) at 8000 RPM	
214	4.39 L (4,390.35 cc)	81 mm × 71 mm (3.189 in × 2.795 in) 365.9 cc (22.33 cu in)	1965-1966	365 P	380 PS (375 bhp; 279 kW) at 7200 RPM	
242C	2.99 L (2,989.55 cc)	77 mm × 53.5 mm (3.031 in × 2.106 in) 249.1 cc (15.20 cu in)	1969	312 P		
255C	2.99 L (2,989.55 cc)	77 mm × 53.5 mm (3.031 in × 2.106 in) 249.1 cc (15.20 cu in)	1969	312 P	420 PS (414 bhp; 309 kW) at 9800 RPM	

== See also ==
- List of Ferrari engines
