= List of Alfa Romeo concept cars =

The Italian car company Alfa Romeo has produced numerous concept cars during the company's history.

Year	Model	Designer	Image
1913	40-60 HP Aerodinamica	Carrozzeria Castagna	
1952	Disco Volante	Alfa Romeo/Touring	
1953	B.A.T. 5	Franco Scaglione/Bertone	
1954	B.A.T. 7	Franco Scaglione/Bertone	
1954	2000 Sportiva	Franco Scaglione/Bertone	
1954	1900 Sport Spider	Franco Scaglione/Bertone	
1955	B.A.T. 9	Franco Scaglione/Bertone	
1955	Giulietta Bertone Spider 002	Franco Scaglione/Bertone	
1955	Giulietta Bertone Spider 004	Franco Scaglione/Bertone	
1956	Alfa Romeo Superflow I & II	Aldo Brovarone/Pinin Farina	
1959	Alfa Romeo Superflow III	Aldo Brovarone/Pinin Farina	
1960	Alfa Romeo Superflow IV	Aldo Brovarone/Pinin Farina	
1960	2000 Sprint Praho	Federico Formenti/Touring	
1961	Giulietta SS Spider Aerodinamica	Pininfarina	
1962	Giulietta SS Coupe Speciale	Pininfarina	
1962	2600 Spider Speciale	Pininfarina	
1963	2600 Coupe Speciale	Pininfarina	
1963	2600 Sprint HS	Giorgetto Giugiaro/Bertone	
1963	Giulia GT Spider	Centro Stile Alfa Romeo/Bertone	
1964	Canguro	Giorgetto Giugiaro/Bertone	
1965	Giulia 1600 Sport	Aldo Brovarone/Pininfarina	
1965	Giulia SS Bertone Prototipo	Giorgetto Giugiaro/Bertone	
1966	Scarabeo	Sergio Sartorelli/O.S.I.	
1967	Montreal Expo Prototipo	Marcello Gandini/Bertone	
1968	Carabo	Marcello Gandini/Bertone	
1968	Iguana	Giorgetto Giugiaro/Italdesign	
1968	P33 Roadster	Paolo Martin/Pininfarina	
1969	33.2	Leonardo Fioravanti/Pininfarina	
1971	Caimano	Giorgetto Giugiaro/Italdesign	
1971	P33 Cuneo	Paolo Martin/Pininfarina	
1972	Alfetta Spider	Diego Ottina/Pininfarina	
1973	Scarabeo II	Ercole Spada/Zagato	
1975	Eagle	Aldo Brovarone/Pininfarina	
1976	Navajo	Marcello Gandini/Bertone	
1976	New York Taxi	Giorgetto Giugiaro/Italdesign	
1982	Capsula	Italdesign Giugiaro	
1983	Zeta 6	Giuseppe Mittino/Zagato	
1983	Delfino	Marc Deschamps/Bertone	
1984	Tempo Libero	Zagato	
1986	Vivace	Diego Ottina/Pininfarina	
1991	Proteo	Alberto Bertelli/Centro Stile Alfa Romeo	
1995	Progetto Cinque	Zender	
1995	Alfa Romeo Vittoria	Gioacchino Acampora/Castagna	
1996	Issima	Sbarro	
1996	Nuvola	Walter de Silva/Centro Stile Alfa Romeo	
1997	Sportut	Luciano D'Ambrosio/Bertone	
1997	Monoposto	Walter de Silva/Centro Stile Alfa Romeo	
1997	Scighera	Fabrizio Giugiaro/Italdesign	
1998	Dardo	Pininfarina	
1999	Centauri	Design Development and Car Innovation	
1999	Bella	Luciano D'Ambrosio/Bertone	
2000	Vola	Leonardo Fioravanti	
2002	Brera	Giorgetto Giugiaro/Italdesign	
2003	Kamal	Wolfgang Egger/Centro Stile Alfa Romeo	
2003	8C Competizione	Wolfgang Egger/Centro Stile Alfa Romeo	
2003	GT Cabrio	Bertone	
2004	Visconti	Giorgetto Giugiaro/Italdesign	
2006	Diva	Centro Stile Alfa Romeo/Espera Sbarro	
2008	B.A.T. 11	David Wilkie/Bertone	
2009	MiTo GTA	Centro Stile Alfa Romeo	
2010	2uettottanta	Lowie Vermeersch/Pininfarina	
2010	Pandion	Michael Robinson/Bertone	
2011	4C	Marco Tencone/Centro Stile Alfa Romeo	
2012	Disco Volante Touring	Carrozzeria Touring Superleggera	
2013	Gloria	Istituto Europeo di Design	
2019	Tonale	Centro Stile Alfa Romeo	
