= Alfa Romeo Diva =

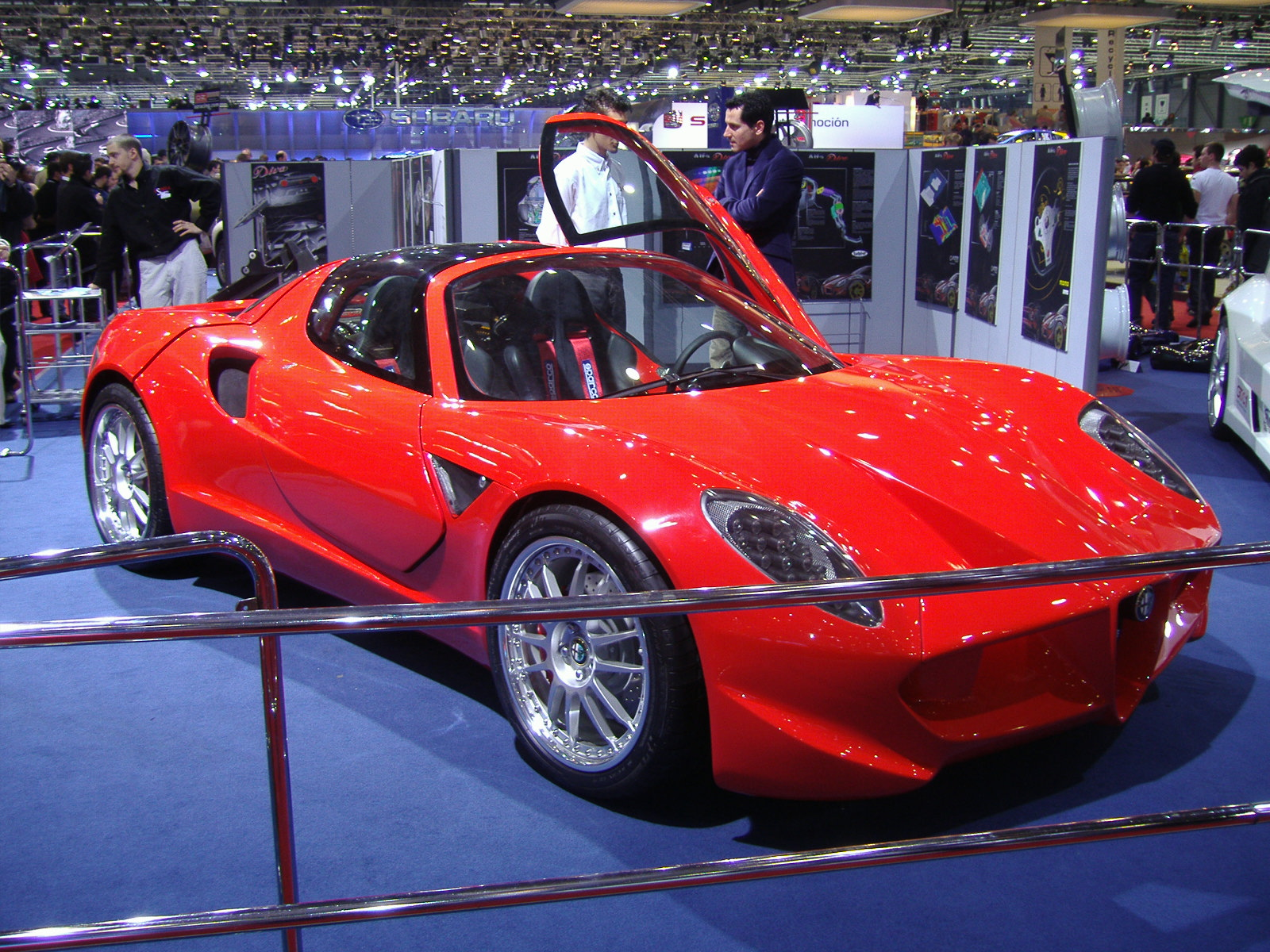
- Alfa Romeo Diva concept car by Sbarro at the 2006 Geneva Motor show

Overview
- Manufacturer: Alfa Romeo
- Production: 2006
- Assembly: Arese, Milan, Italy (Carrozzeria Granturismo)
- Designer: Zbigniew Maurer (Centro Stile Alfa Romeo); Espera Sbarro

Body and chassis
- Class: Concept car
- Body style: 2-seater coupe
- Layout: MR layout
- Doors: Butterfly

Powertrain
- Engine: 3.2 L (3,179 cc) V6
- Transmission: 6-speed robotized manual gearbox (Selespeed)

Dimensions
- Wheelbase: 2,402 mm (94.6 in)
- Length: 3,894 mm (153.3 in)
- Width: 1,896 mm (74.6 in)
- Height: 1,182 mm (46.5 in)
- Curb weight: 1,100 kg (2,425 lb)

The Alfa Romeo Diva is a concept car produced by Italian automobile manufacturer Alfa Romeo, first shown at the Geneva Motor Show in 2006. The car was developed through a collaboration between Centro Stile Alfa Romeo, Fiat Group's research centre Elasis and the Espera design school led by Franco Sbarro.

The design of the car is inspired by the iconic Alfa Romeo 33 Stradale, making use of the butterfly doors. Although the car has the characteristic Alfa-nose, the nose also resembles that of a Formula One car.

The car is built on a heavily modified chassis from an Alfa Romeo 159 and a transverse mounted 3.2 litre 290 bhp (216 kW; 294 PS) Busso V6. The car has top speed of 270 km/h (168 mph) and can accelerate from 0 to 100 km/h (62 mph) in five seconds.
