= Ferrari 365 P Berlinetta Speciale =

1966 concept sports car

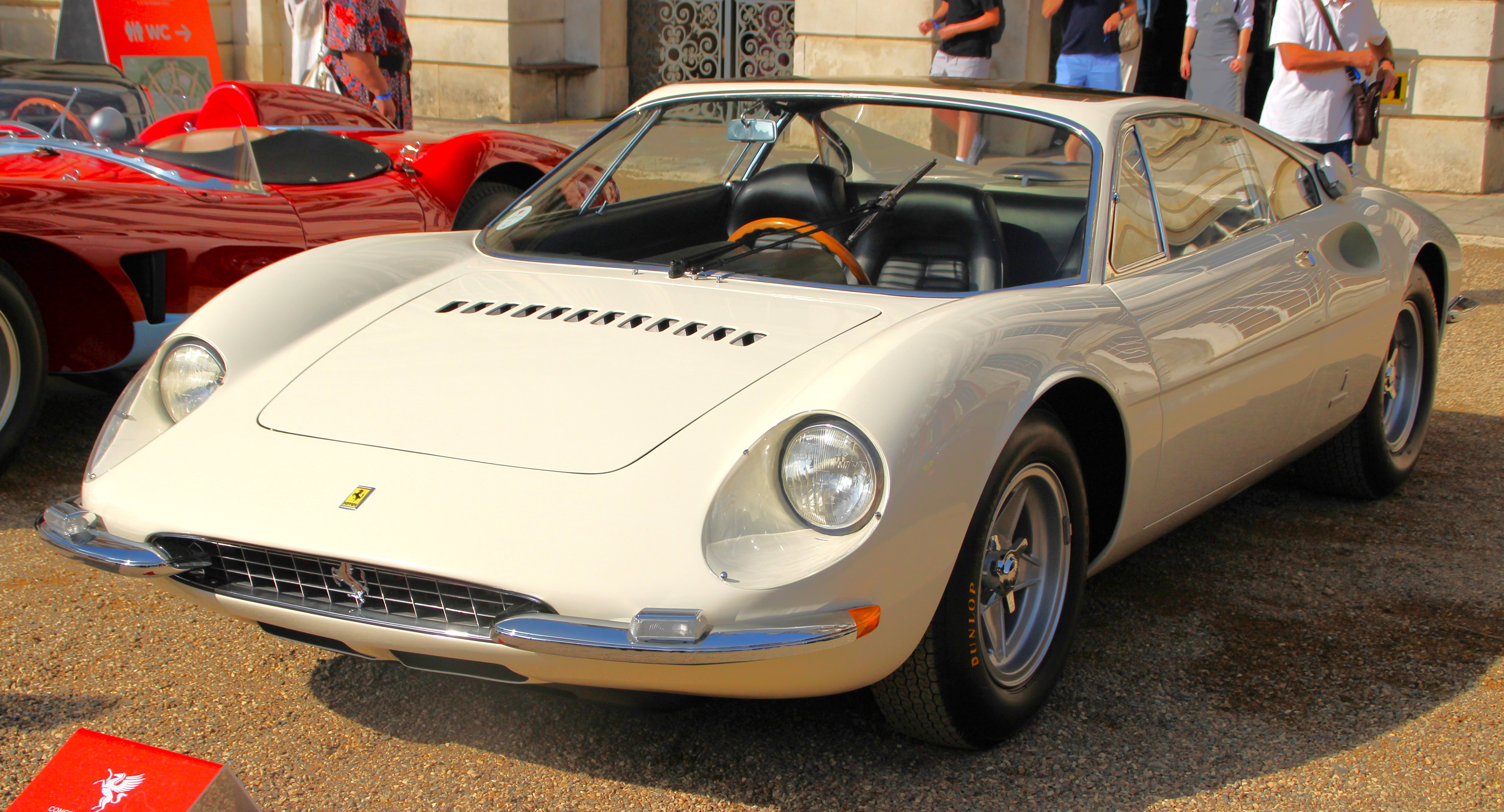

Overview
- Manufacturer: Pininfarina; Ferrari
- Also called: Berlinetta Tre-posti; Ferrari Guida Centrale
- Production: 1966; 2 produced
- Designer: Aldo Brovarone at Pininfarina

Body and chassis
- Body style: 2-door 3-seat berlinetta
- Layout: Rear mid-engine, rear-wheel-drive
- Related: Ferrari 365 P2

Powertrain
- Engine: 4.4 L (4390.35 cc) Colombo V12
- Power output: 380 PS (375 hp; 279 kW)
- Transmission: 5-speed manual

Dimensions
- Wheelbase: 2,600 mm (102.4 in)
- Length: 4,400 mm (173.2 in)
- Width: 1,890 mm (74.4 in)
- Height: 1,190 mm (46.9 in)
- Curb weight: 1,020 kg (2,249 lb)

See Ferrari 365 P2 for the race car

The Ferrari 365 P Berlinetta Speciale (also commonly referred to as the Berlinetta Tre-posti) was a concept sports car designed and produced by Pininfarina and Ferrari in 1966. It featured a mid-engined layout of a donor racing car chassis and three-seat arrangement with a central driving position, as later popularised with the McLaren F1. It was the first purpose-built, mid-engine, road-going Ferrari-branded car. Other similar Ferraris at that time were road-usable race cars like the 1965 250 LM 'Speciale'.

== Development ==
As racing cars shifted their engines from the front to the rear-mid position, automakers began to design road cars with the same layout; the first to reach production was the 1962 René Bonnet Djet. Styling would have to change to match, and design house Pininfarina built three Ferrari-based prototypes. One of those projects was the a three-seater ("Tre-posti" in Italian) the Ferrari 365 P Berlinetta Speciale.

Sergio Pininfarina, soon to be Head of Pininfarina, initiated the project. Enzo Ferrari had steadfastly refused to create a road-going car with a V12 engine in the mid-rear position, or to compromise Ferrari’s traditional design language. US Ferrari importer Luigi Chinetti and Head of Fiat Gianni Agnelli, on the other hand, were interested in acquiring such cars.

While Ferrari did not immediately create any road cars in this specification, the Berlinetta Speciale did influence the marque's future styling, and the 365 GT/4 Berlinetta Boxer prototype emerged inu 1971.

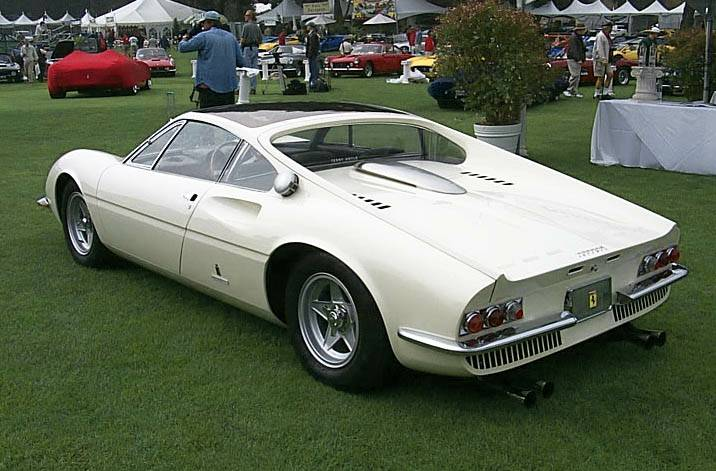
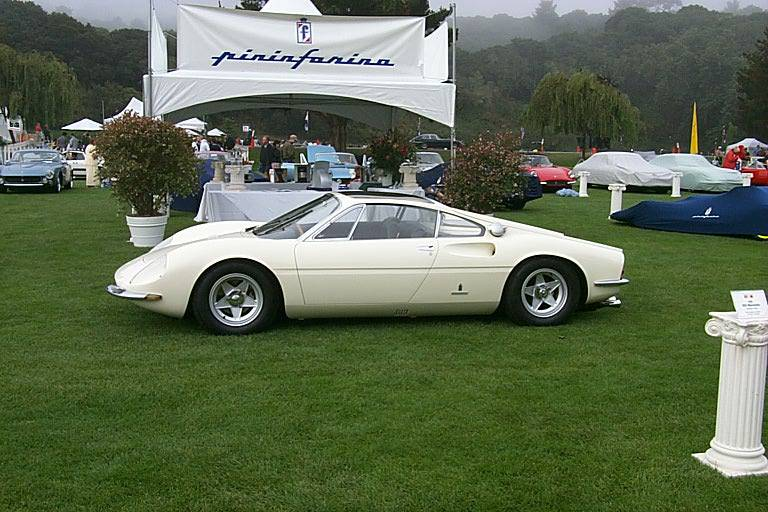
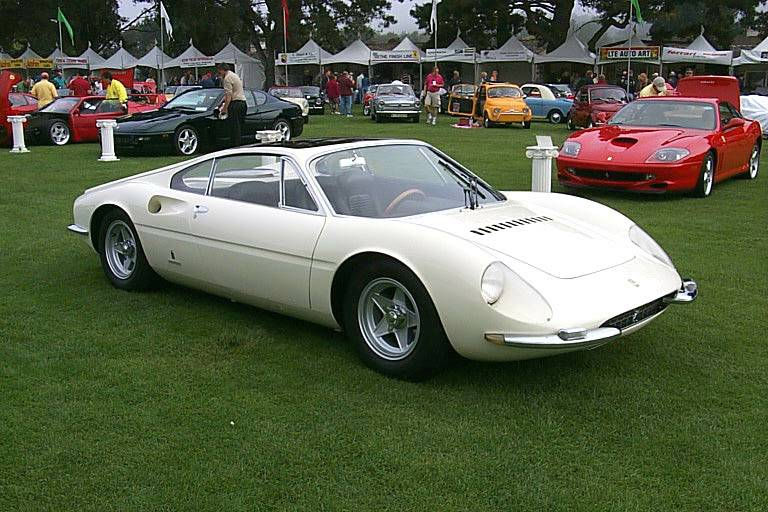
Ferrari 365 P Berlinetta Speciale s/n 8971 of Luigi Chinetti.

=== Design ===
Had Ferrari built it, nobody would ever have given a second thought to the Miura
Luigi "Coco" Chinetti Junior

The exterior design was loosely based on the existing road-going Dino concept, already sporting a mid-engine layout and presented just a year earlier, in 1965. Aldo Brovarone as Pininfarina's soon to be Head of Styling and creator of all the road-going Dino exterior designs, is also credited with the Berlinetta Speciale. Because of the many similarities to the production Dino 206 GT, the Berlinetta Speciale is seen as a scaled up version of the original Dino and its predecessor, presented at the same time as the Dino Berlinetta GT final prototype, in 1966.

Pininfarina created the bodies in aluminium, over a mid-engine competition chassis. The most unusual feature was the triple seating with the driver situated in the center, slightly forward, with the other two seats placed slightly behind. The center-mount windshield wiper was carried over from the donor race car. New were the luxury additions like leather seats, carpets, chrome bumpers and fittings. The overall shape was very similar to the Dino Berlinetta Speciale and more so to the Dino Berlinetta GT, the final prototype before the production variant. Apart from the seating arrangement, also the overall dimensions and shape were altered to accommodate a bigger V12 powerplant. The Ferrari Berlinetta Speciale was also known as "Tre-Posti" for its unique seating design.

Additional original features include a full, fixed Perspex sunroof. Overall side profile and details like a visible fuel cap and tear shaped air vents were similar to the Dino counterparts. An integrated chrome roll bar was added to the cabin for additional protection.

== Production ==
Only two examples were ever built with various distinctive details, both in 1966.

=== Chassis 8971 ===
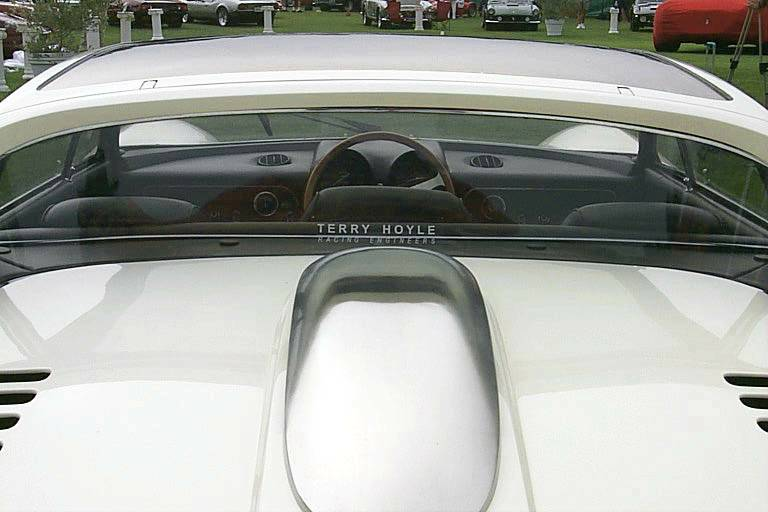
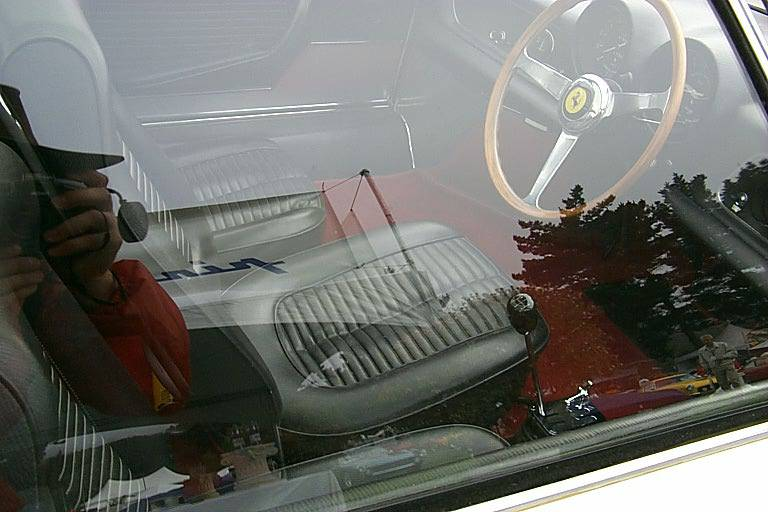
Centre driving position and seating arrangement.

Two racing chassis of the 365/P2 were used by Pininfarina in order to build the concept car. The first car was built on chassis 8971 and was the one destined to be a show car. Completed in September 1966 and finished in Garenia White, the first example was presented in October of the same year at the Paris Motor Show on the Pininfarina stand. The interior with the three seats, was upholstered in black imitation leather. The car was however lacking any running gear at that time.

The Berlinetta Speciale chassis 8971, was presented all around the world on numerous occasions during 1966 and 1967, appearing at the Earl's Court Motor Show in London, Brussels, Geneva, and Los Angeles motor shows and salons. After the show tour, the US Ferrari importer Luigi Chinetti, acquired the car in May 1967. It was invoiced by Ferrari for the racing chassis with modifications and by Pininfarina for the bodywork and tooling bills. The reported price was around US$21,160, without shipping costs. Chinetti soon sold the car twice to his customers, at first to a New York banker for US$26,000 but bought back the car on both occasions.

From 1969, the Berlinetta Speciale remained in the Chinetti family, being used by Chinetti's son Luigi "Coco" Chinetti Junior. In 2014 Gooding & Co. offered the car for sale and even though the reserve was not met and the car remained unsold, the highest bid was US$23.5 million.

=== Chassis 8815 ===
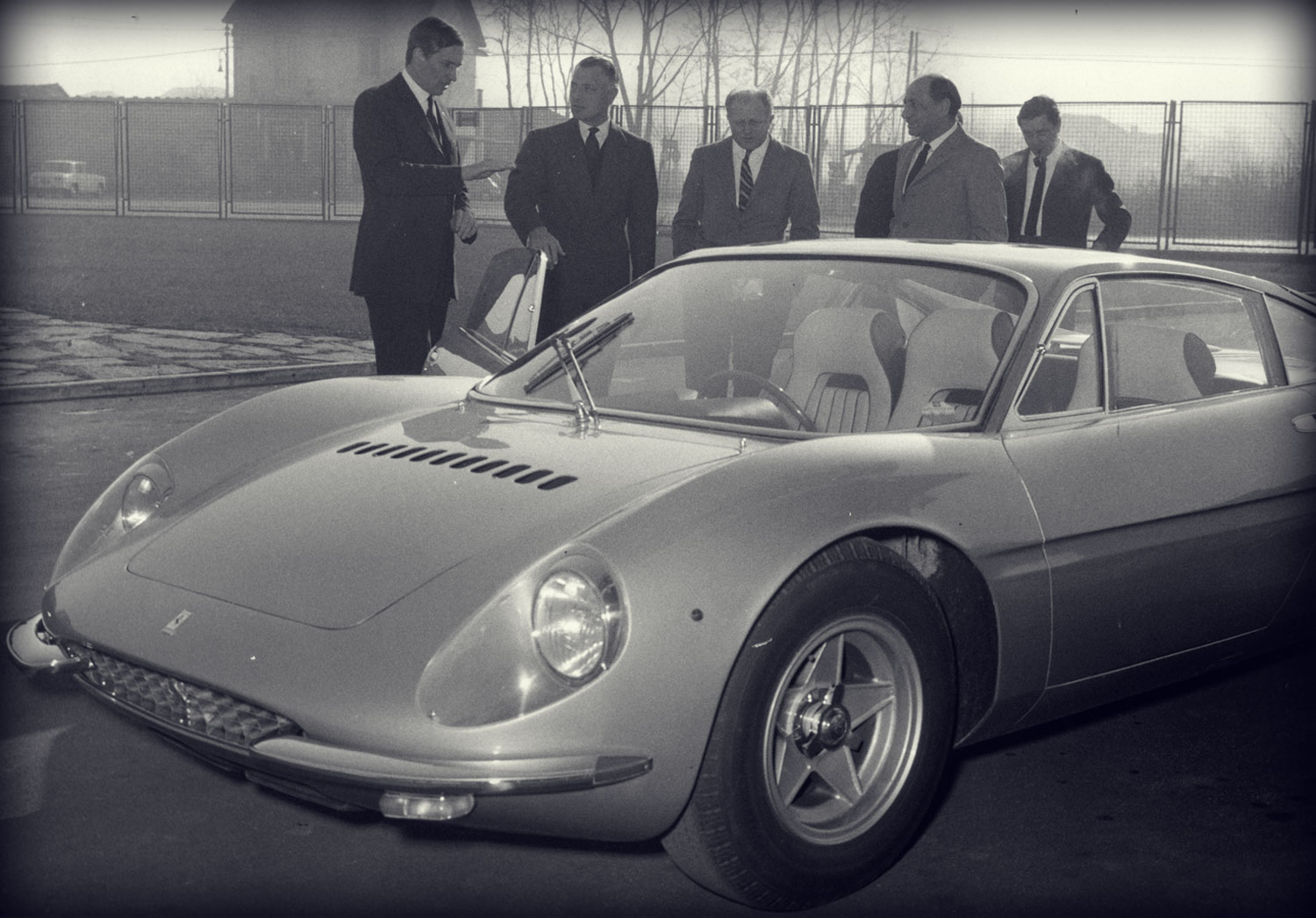
Berlinetta Speciale s/n 8815 of Gianni Agnelli. Standing from left: Mike Parkes, Gianni Agnelli, Giovanni Nasi, Renzo Carli and Sergio Pininfarina.

You didn't have time to stop before people were immediately around it. But it was fun. It had monstrous acceleration. You just had to get used to the driver's seat in the middle, because it gave an ideal any reference points to either side, right or left.
Gianni Agnelli on his Berlinetta Speciale.

The second example, chassis 8815, was reportedly commissioned by the Chairman of Fiat Gianni Agnelli, upon seeing the first example presented at the Paris Motor Show. He took delivery of the car sometime in 1966. This example was finished in metallic grey with a black-painted pinstripe along the length of the car. Originally it had no sunroof, but it was installed early on. The car was delivered with a large, chromed rear spoiler and with fabric covered seats and during its lifetime was repainted in metallic blue and then red.

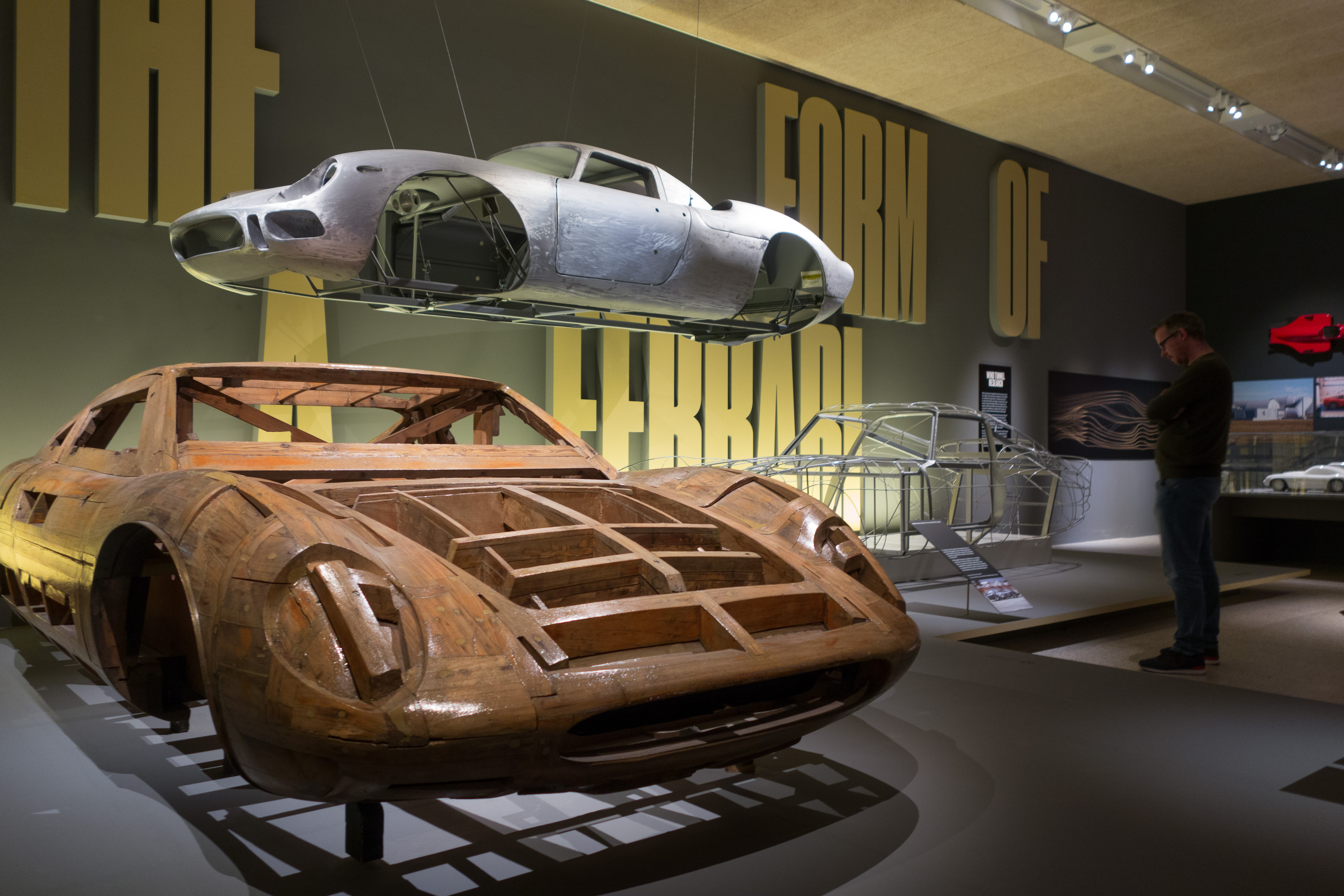
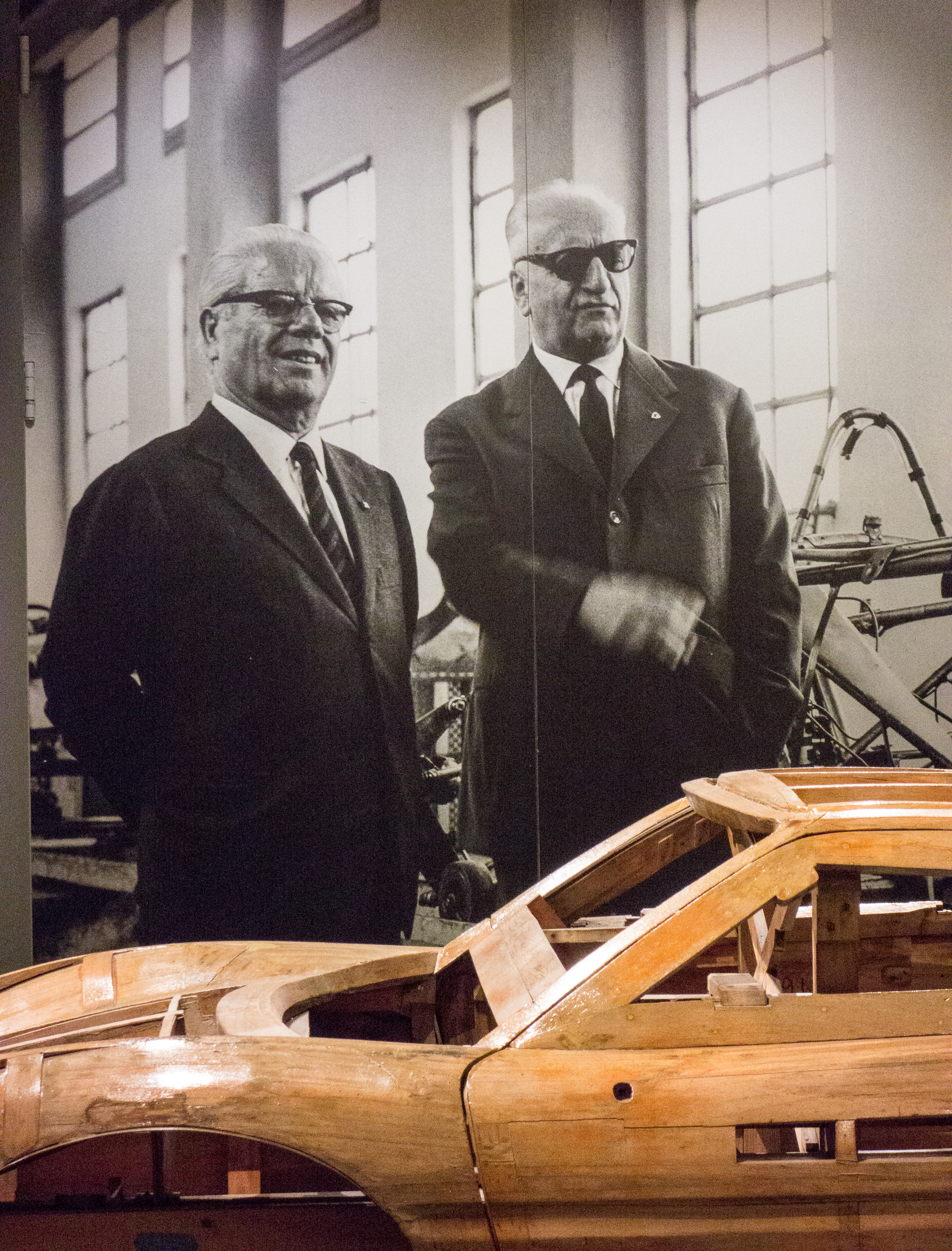
Poster of Battista Pininfarina (left) and Enzo Ferrari (right) over wooden buckframe of 365 P Berlinetta Speciale at London Design Museum.

== Specifications ==
=== Engine and transmission ===
The 365P is powered by a race-oriented variant of the Colombo 60° V12 engine, carried over from the Ferrari 365 P2, with SOHC valvetrain actuating two valves per cylinder. It was mounted in the rear, mid-section of the car, longitudinally with the transaxle-type, 5-speed manual gearbox. The total capacity of 4,390 cc (4.4 L; 267.9 cu in) resulted from internal measurements of 81 by 71 mm (3.2 by 2.8 in) of bore and stroke respectively.

Fuel was fed by three Weber 40DFI carburettors and with a compression ratio of 8.8:1 the resulting power output was 380 PS (279 kW; 375 hp) at 7,300 rpm. The engines also retained the dry-sump lubrication system from the racing specification. Top speed was estimated at 245 km/h (152.2 mph). Engine was not detuned as compared to the original.

=== Chassis and suspension ===
The mid-engine, tubular competition chassis was similar to that of Ferrari 330 P2 and was in fact borrowed from the 365 P2 customer version, the same as used by Luigi Chinetti's NART team in 1965, with addition of a roll bar and cast aluminium wheels. The wheelbase, measuring 2,600 mm (102.4 in), was 200 mm (7.9 in) stretched over the original frame.

The car uses independent suspension front and rear, with unequal-length wishbones, coil springs, telescopic shock absorbers with anti-roll bars. The four-wheel disc brakes are servo-assisted. The kerb weight was 1,020 kg (2,249 lb) and the total length 4,400 mm (173.2 in).

== See also ==
- Dino Berlinetta Speciale
