= Alfa Romeo Issima =

Overview
- Manufacturer: Alfa Romeo
- Also called: Sbarro Issima
- Production: 1996
- Designer: Sbarro

Body and chassis
- Class: Concept car
- Body style: Roadster
- Layout: Front-engine rear-wheel drive
- Platform: Dual Frame

Powertrain
- Engine: 5.9L V12 (pair of 3.0 V6)
- Transmission: 5-speed manual

Dimensions
- Wheelbase: 2.66 m (105 in)
- Length: 3.80 m (150 in)
- Curb weight: 1,200 kg (2,646 lb)

The Alfa Romeo Issima is a concept design car by the Swiss engineering company Sbarro. The Issima was introduced at the 1996 Geneva Motor Show, it is equipped with two 3 litre V6, creating a V12 with 500 bhp (373 kW; 507 PS).

Its name derives from the Italian suffix "-issima" ("very very" for feminine names), used on adjectives.

== Technical specifications ==
- Engine: 12 cylinders (two V6 twin in line) Alfa Romeo, 4 valves per cylinder
- configuration: front longitudinal
- displacement: 5918 cc (2 x 2959 cc)
- power: 500 bhp (373 kW; 507 PS)
- chassis: Dual Frame
- transmission: rear wheel drive
- gearbox: manual
- wheels: front : 8,5 x 19 " / rear : 11 x 19 "
- tracks front/rear : 1,70 / 1,80 m
