= Alfa Romeo Eagle =

Concept car built by Pininfarina

Overview
- Manufacturer: Alfa Romeo
- Production: 1975
- Assembly: Italy
- Designer: Aldo Brovarone at Pininfarina

Body and chassis
- Class: Concept car
- Body style: 2-seat targa
- Layout: Front-engine, rear-wheel drive
- Platform: Alfetta GT

Powertrain
- Engine: 1,779 cc (108.6 cu in) DOHC inline-four engine
- Transmission: 5-speed manual

Dimensions
- Wheelbase: 2,400 mm (94.5 in)
- Length: 4,080 mm (160.6 in)
- Width: 1,630 mm (64.2 in)
- Height: 1,220 mm (48.0 in)

The Alfa Romeo Eagle is a concept car built by Pininfarina. The car debuted at the Turin Auto Show in 1975.

== Background ==
Three years after unveiling their Alfetta Spider prototype built using the chassis and drive-train of the Alfetta Berlina, Pininfarina presented a new Alfa-based styling exercise. Like the Alfetta Spider, the Eagle had a targa top, but was built using the Alfetta GT as a base. The goal was to show that it was possible to design an open car with good passive safety.

== The car ==
The Eagle's wedge-shaped body was designed by Aldo Brovarone, who drew inspiration from the sports prototype cars of the time and the Alfa Romeo 33/TT/12 in particular. The body was characterized by a prominent rearward-inclined or swept-back roll-over bar. The interior diverged strongly from the contemporary Alfa style, with soft matte plastic dashboard finishes, a mono-spoke steering wheel and fully digital instrumentation.

With a 91.0 kW (122 hp) 4-cylinder Twin Cam engine in standard GT tune, good aerodynamics and weighing just 1,000 kg (2,204.6 lb), the Eagle was rated at a maximum speed of 198 km/h (123.0 mph) while returning significantly better consumption than the model from which it was derived.

As with Pininfarina's earlier Spider proposal, the Eagle did not go into production. Alfa Romeo's management instead opted to refresh the style of the Duetto.
