= Aldo Brovarone =

Italian automobile designer (1926–2020)

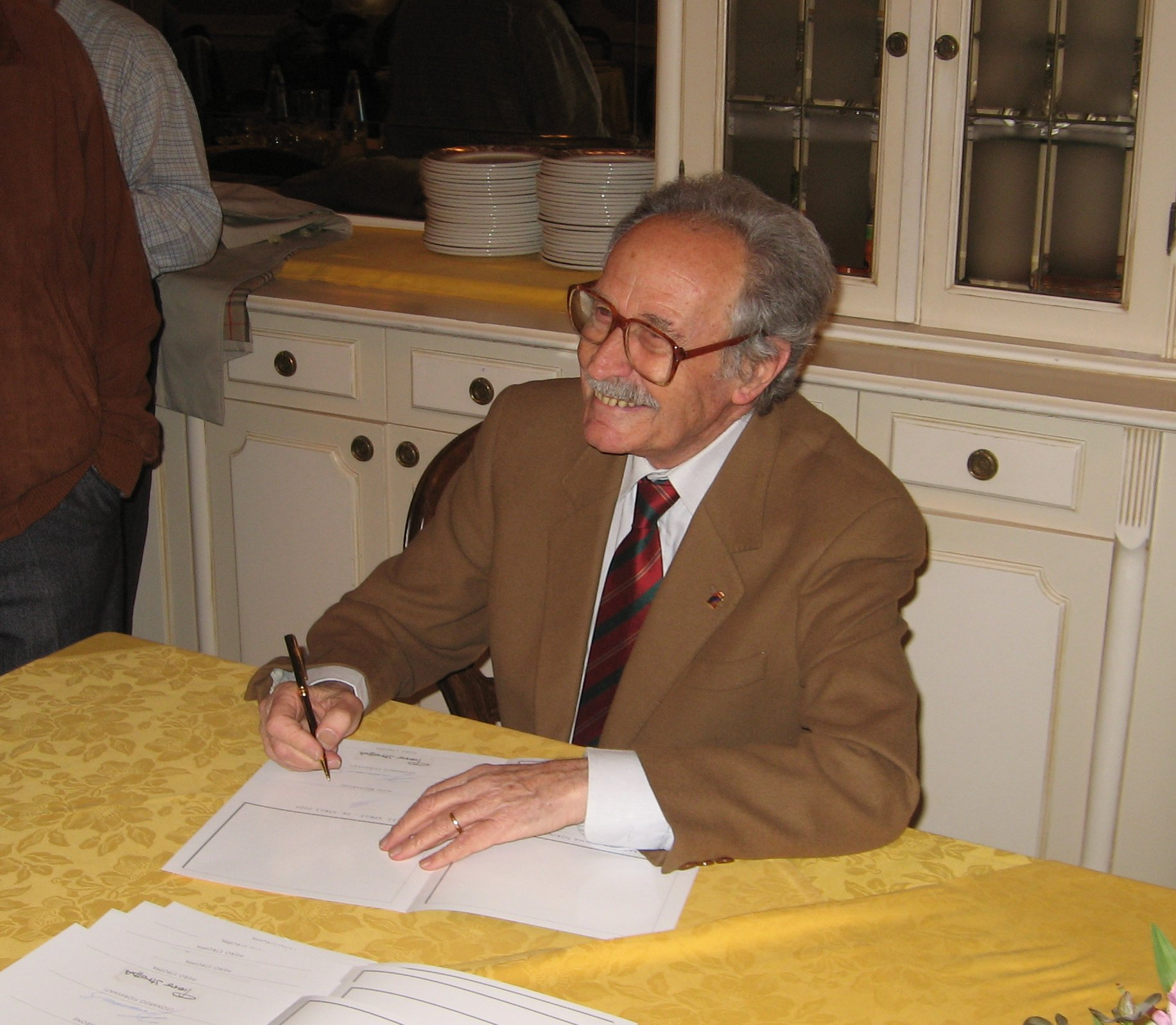
Aldo Brovarone (2009)

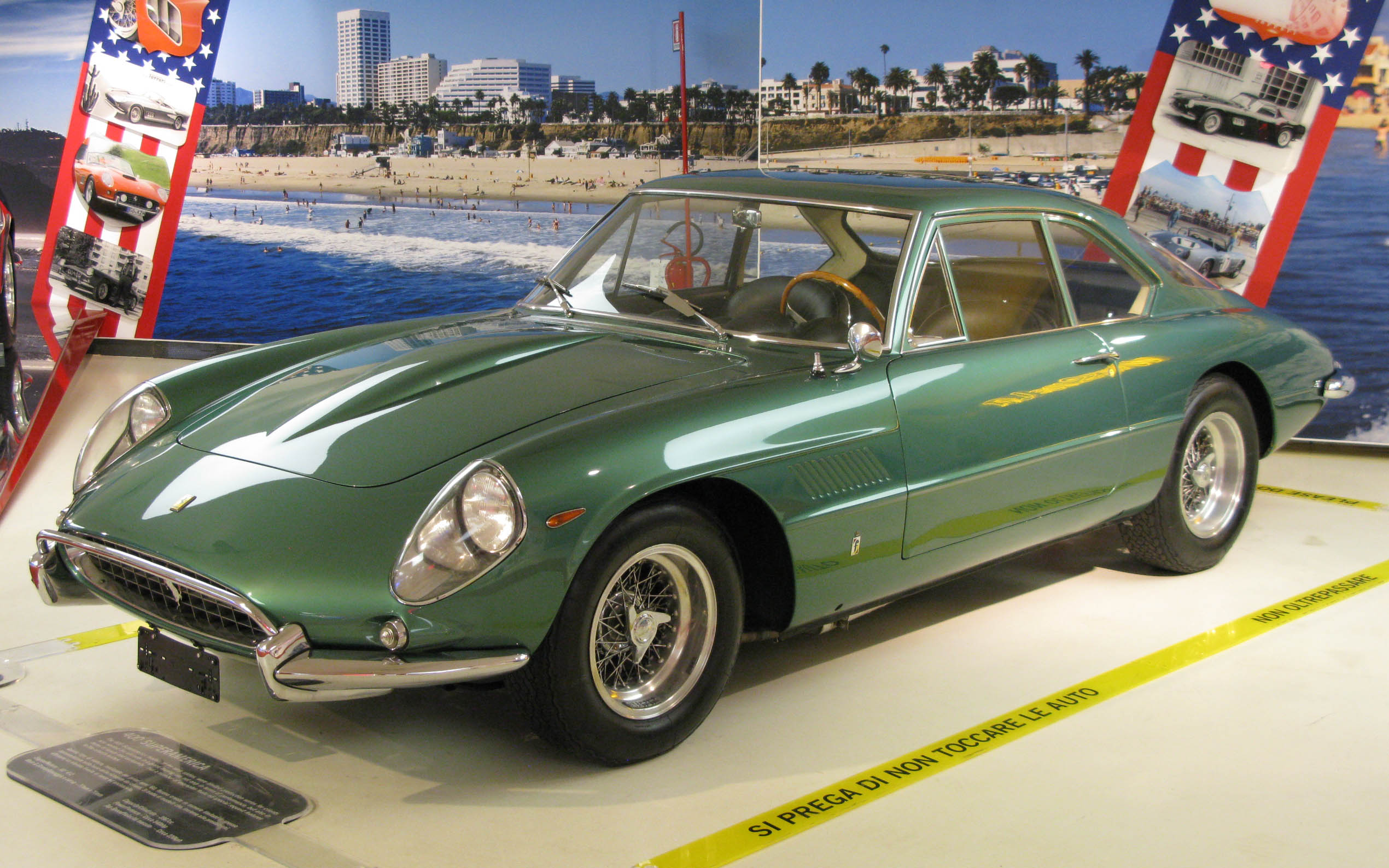
Ferrari 400 Superamerica II

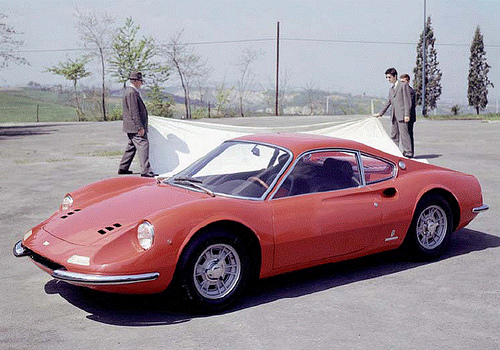
Dino 206 GT

Aldo Brovarone (24 June 1926 – 12 October 2020) was an Italian automobile designer and the chief stylist with Carrozzeria Pininfarina (1974–1988) – widely known for a prominent range of work including the Dino 206 GT, Lancia Gamma Coupé and the Peugeot 504 (sedan).

== Background ==
Brovarone was born on 24 June 1926, in Vigliano Biellese, in Italy's Piedmont textile region. He demonstrated artistic talent at an early age, and was fascinated by airplanes and dreamed of becoming a pilot. He later studied at the state commercial and technical institute, considering a career in the textile industry.

His studies were interrupted by WWII, and he was deported by the Germans and imprisoned for one year in a German concentration camp in occupied Poland. Having managed to survive, he later worked as a designer with a refrigerator company.

== Career ==
In 1949 Brovarone expatriated to Buenos Aires, Argentina and worked as a graphic designer at an advertising firm, later working with AUTOAR (Automotores Argentinos) until it ended operations in 1953. Brovarone returned to Italy to work with Piero Dusio of Cisitalia, where he first developed brochure illustrations and began his career as an automobile designer.

On introduction from Dusio, Brovarone met Battista "Pinin" Farina and in 1952, he joined Carrozzeria Pinin Farina (later simply Pininfarina) first as assistant stylist to Francesco Salomone and Franco Martinengo. He subsequently became lead designer, beginning with the design of the Ferrari Superamerica II, presented at the 1960 Turin Auto Show.

At Pininfarina, Brovarone designed the sedan variant of the Peugeot 504. In 2007 he verified that he did not design the coupe and cabriolet variants, confirming these were designed at Pininfarina, but under the direction of Franco Martinengo, from sketches by Peugeot.

At Pininfarina, he collaborated on the 1987 Ferrari F40 with its designer Pietro Camardella, just before retiring.

== Later years ==
After his retirement from Pininfarina in 1988, Brovarone consulted as a stylist with Stola, later contributing to the design of Studiotorino's Porsche Boxster-based Ruf RK Spyder, named at the 2005 Milan Triennale as the most beautiful car in the world. At Studiotorino, Broverone secretly penned a coupe variant that management later accepted.

He continued to live in Turin, without computer or cellphone, and continued to make pencil sketches and tempera illustrations which were printed as collectible postcards.

He died at 94 on 12 October 2020 at Molinette hospital in Turin, several days after the death of his wife Martarita, and was survived by his nephew Cesare Brovarone. He had been a judge for two only concours d'elegance organized in Biella, at Villa La Malpenga in Vigliano Biellese (in 2016) and at Ricetto di Candelo (in 2017).

His life and work was recounted in the 2019 book, Stile & raffinatezza. Le creazioni di Aldo Brovarone ("Style & Refinement. The Creations of Aldo Brovarone) by Giuliano Silli, presented at the Third Annual Parco del Valentino Concours d'Elegance.

== Design work ==
- Alfa Romeo 6C 3000 CM Superflow (1955–1960 concept). A series of four consecutive bodies on the same chassis.
- Alfa Romeo Eagle
- Alfa Romeo Giulia 1600 Sport
- Alfa Romeo Spider (Duetto) with Martinengo, Salomone, and Carli of Pininfarina
- Cisitalia 33DF Voloradente
- Ford-Cisitalia 808 coupé
- Dino 206 GT
- Dino Berlinetta GT
- Dino Berlinetta Speciale
- Ferrari 250 LM
- Ferrari 365 GT 2+2
- Ferrari 365 P Berlinetta Speciale
- Ferrari 375 America Coupe Speciale (1954 for Gianni Agnelli)
- Ferrari 400 Superamerica Pinin Farina Coupé (1959 for Gianni Agnelli)
- Maserati 5000 GT Pinin Farina Coupé (1961 for Gianni Agnelli)
- Ferrari 400 Superamerica Coupé Aerodinamico
- Ferrari Superfast II–IV (1960–1962 concept). A series of three consecutive bodies on the same chassis.
- Ferrari 500 Superfast
- Ferrari F40
- Lancia Gamma Coupé
- Maserati A6GCS/53 Pinin Farina Berlinetta
- Peugeot 504 (berlina/sedan)
- Peugeot 604
- Stola Dedica
- Stola Abarth Monotipo
- Stola S82 Spyder
- Stola GTS
- Ruf RK Coupé and Spyder
- Ruf R Spyder
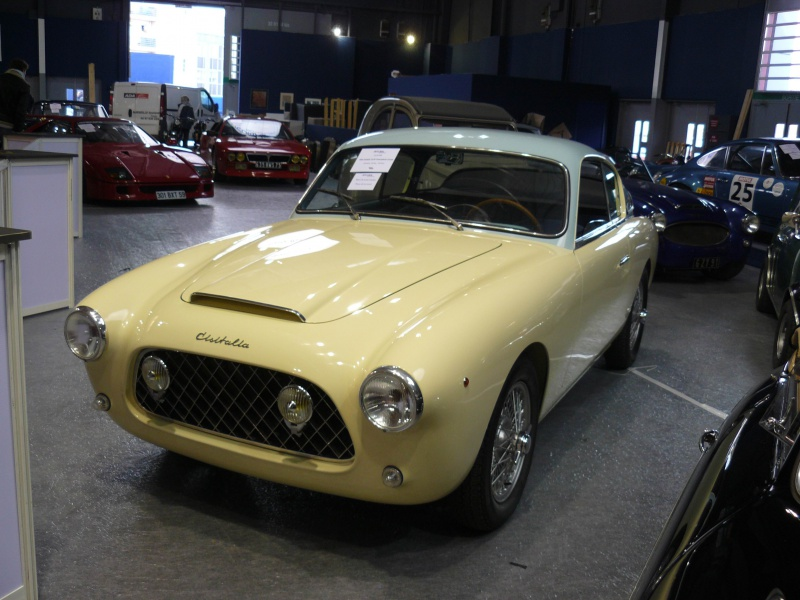
Cisitalia Type 33 DF Volo Radente

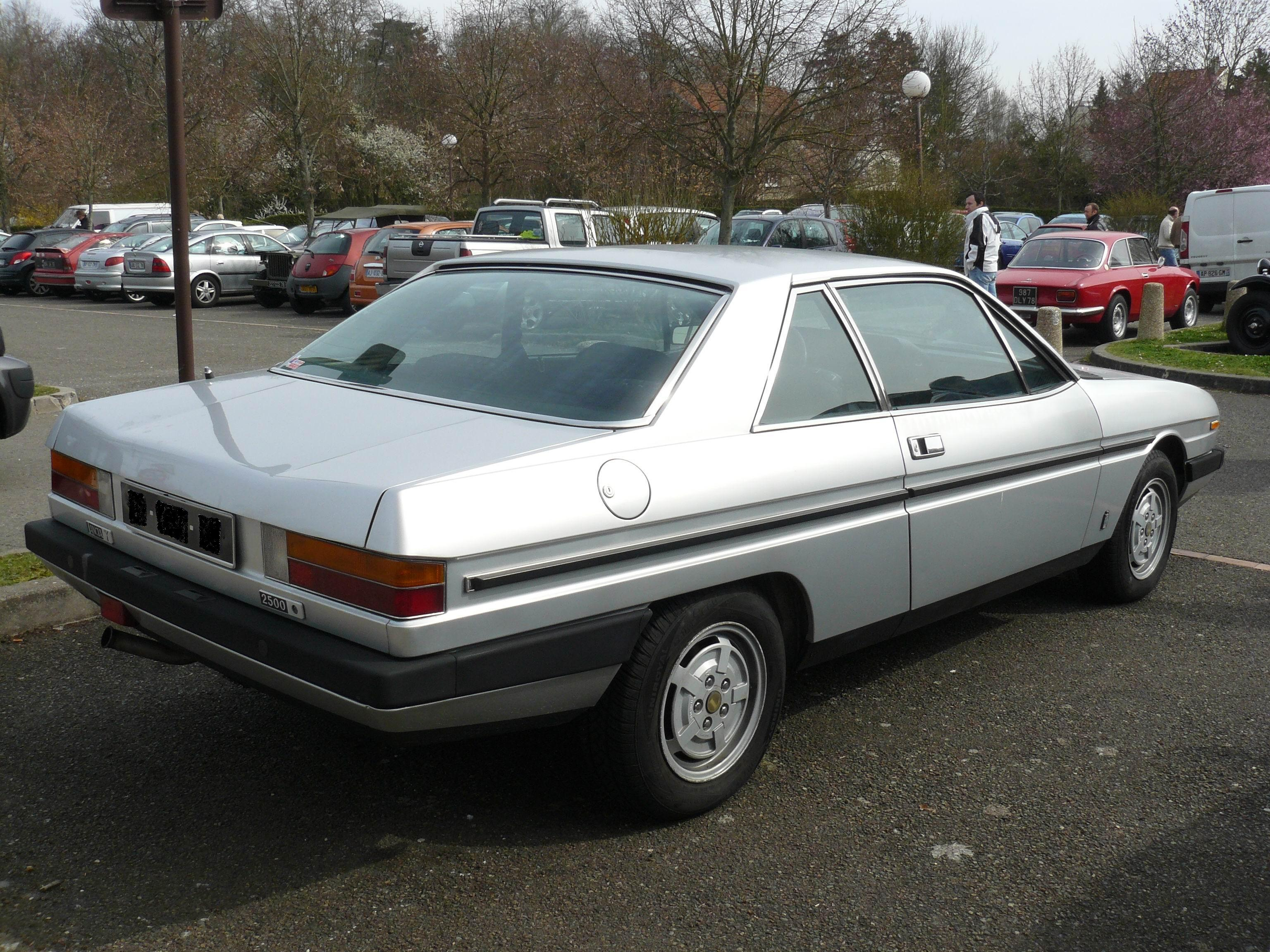
Lancia Gamma Coupé

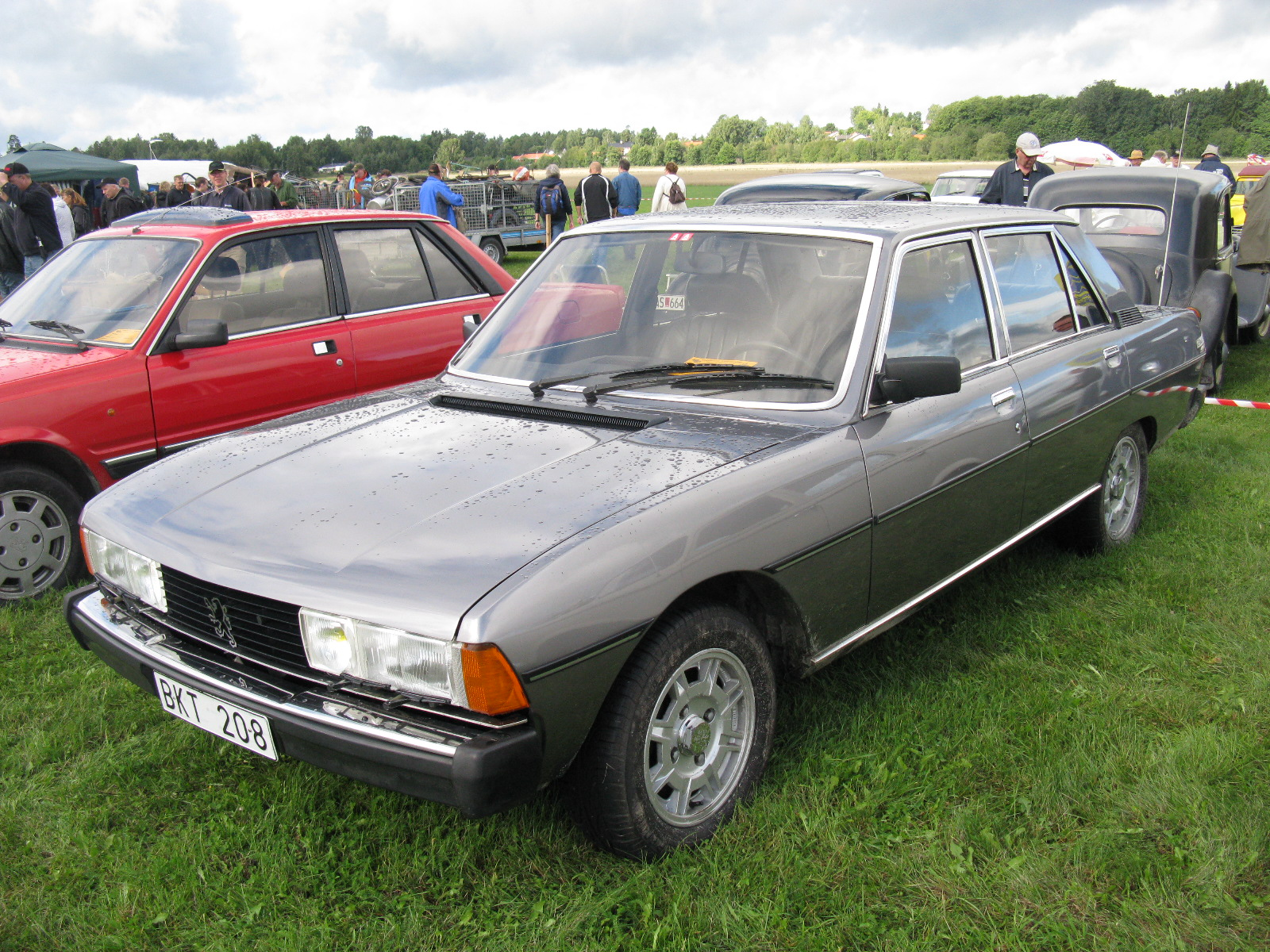
Peugeot 604

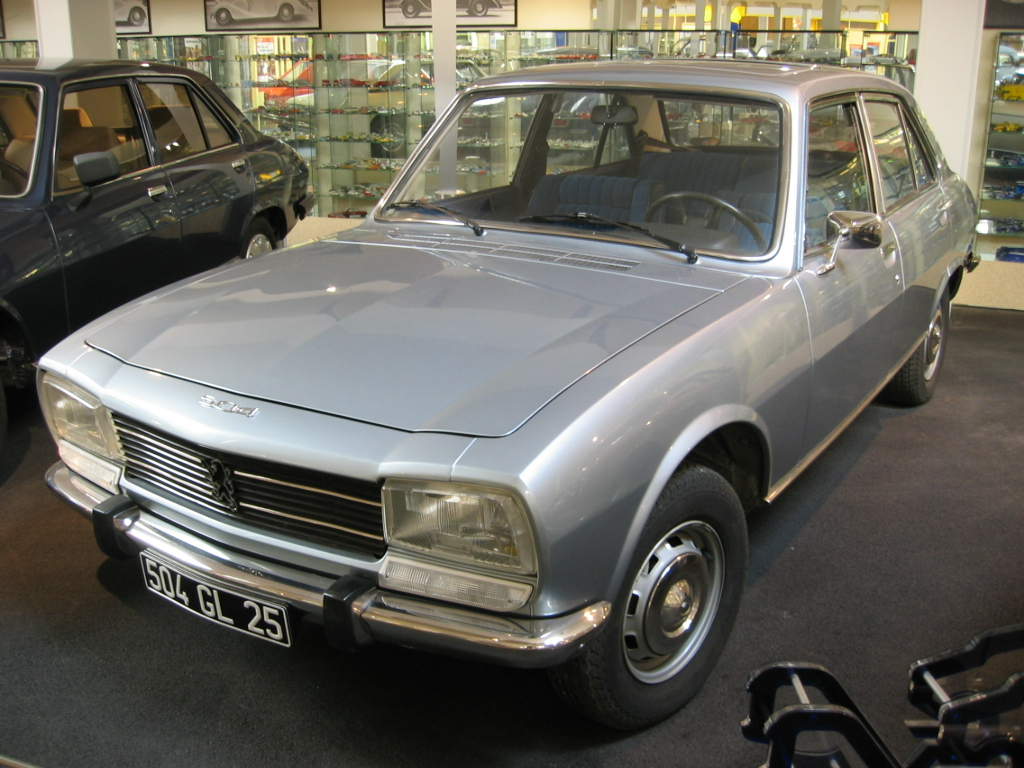
Peugeot 504

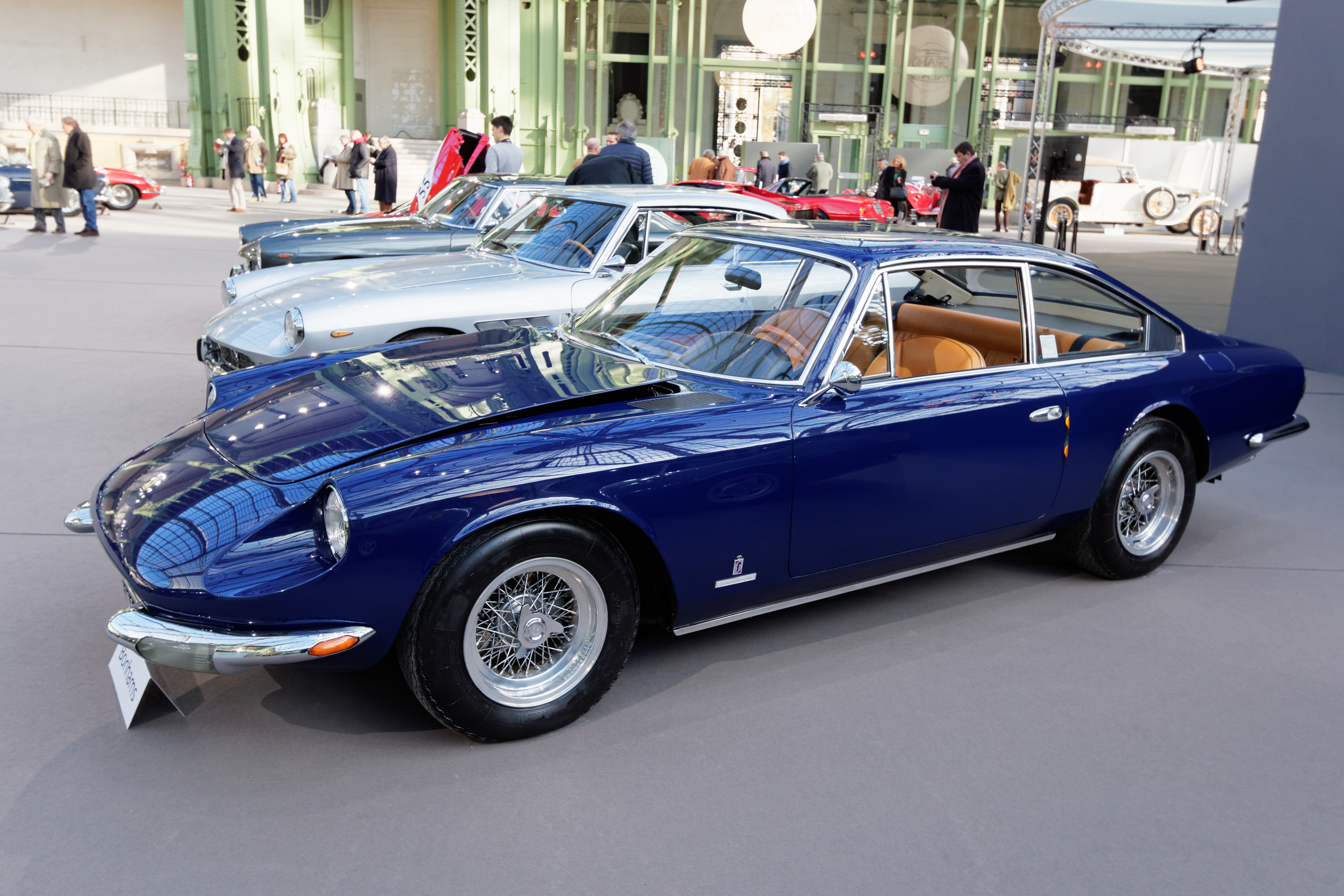
Ferrari 365 GT 2+2

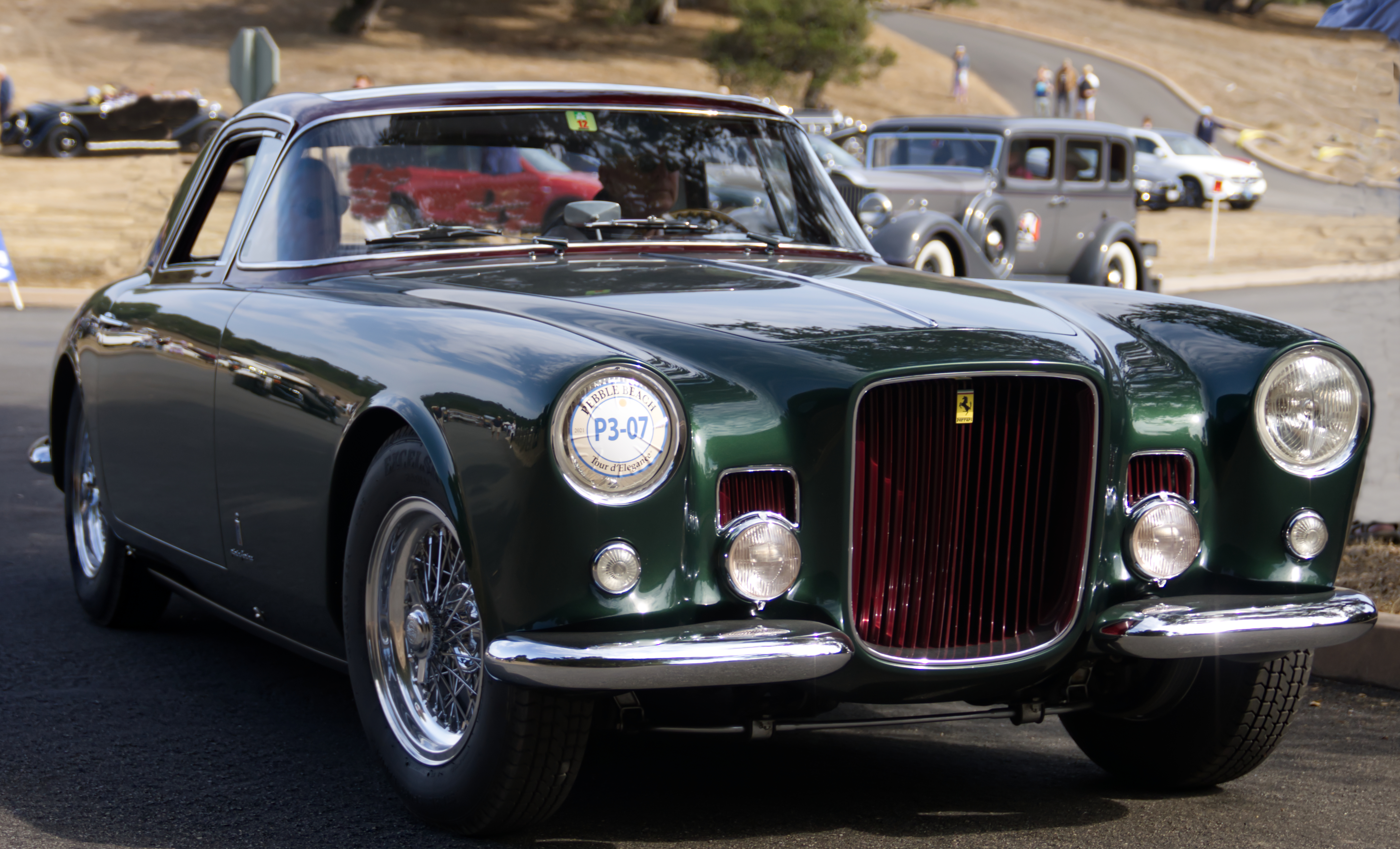
1955 Ferrari 375 America Coupé Speciale for Gianni Agnelli

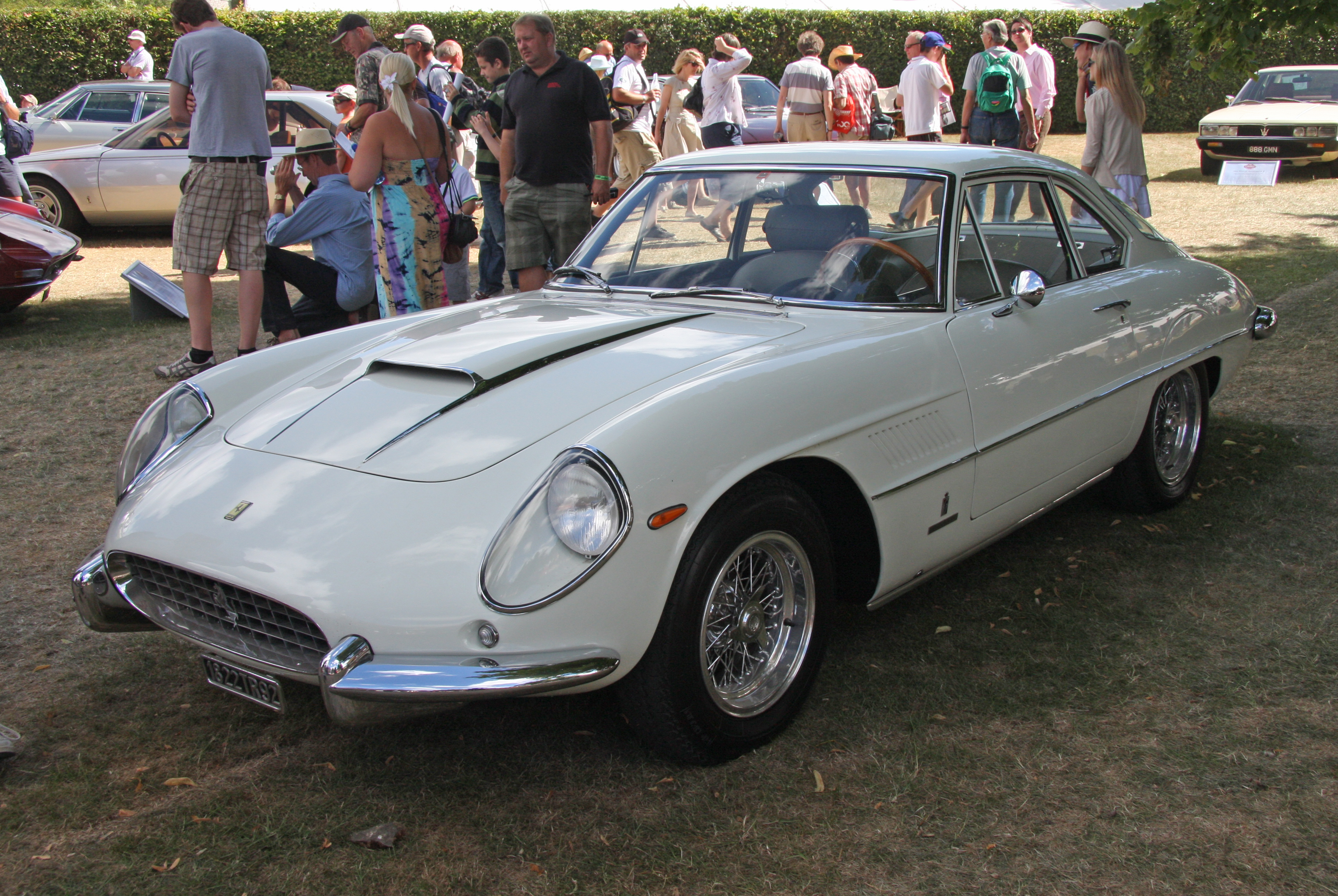
Ferrari 400 Superamerica Aerodinamico Coupé

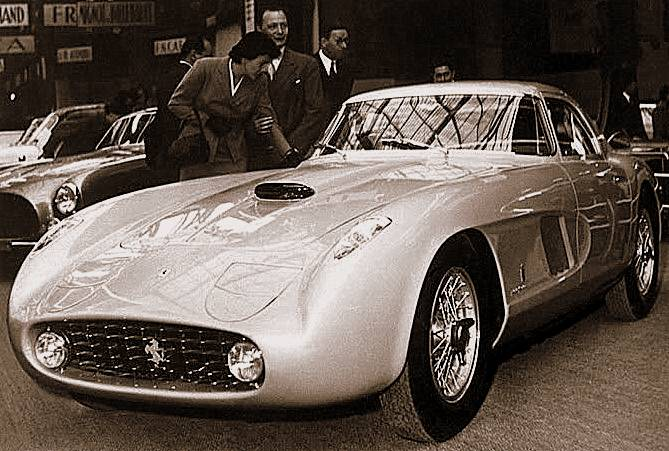
Ferrari 375 MM Berlinetta Speciale, for actress Ingrid Bergman

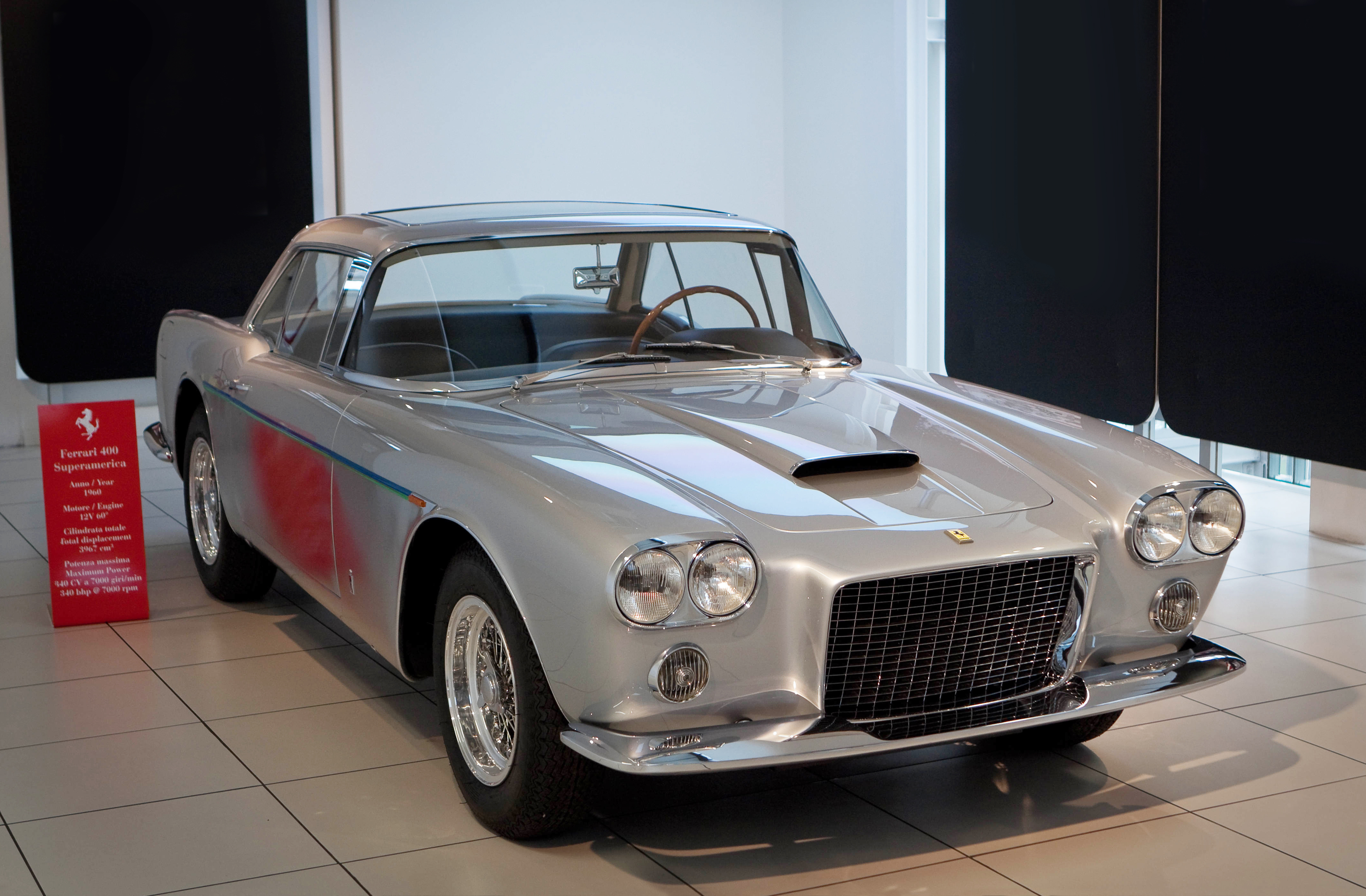
Ferrari 400 Superamerica Pinin Farina Coupé, for Fiat CEO Gianni Agnelli

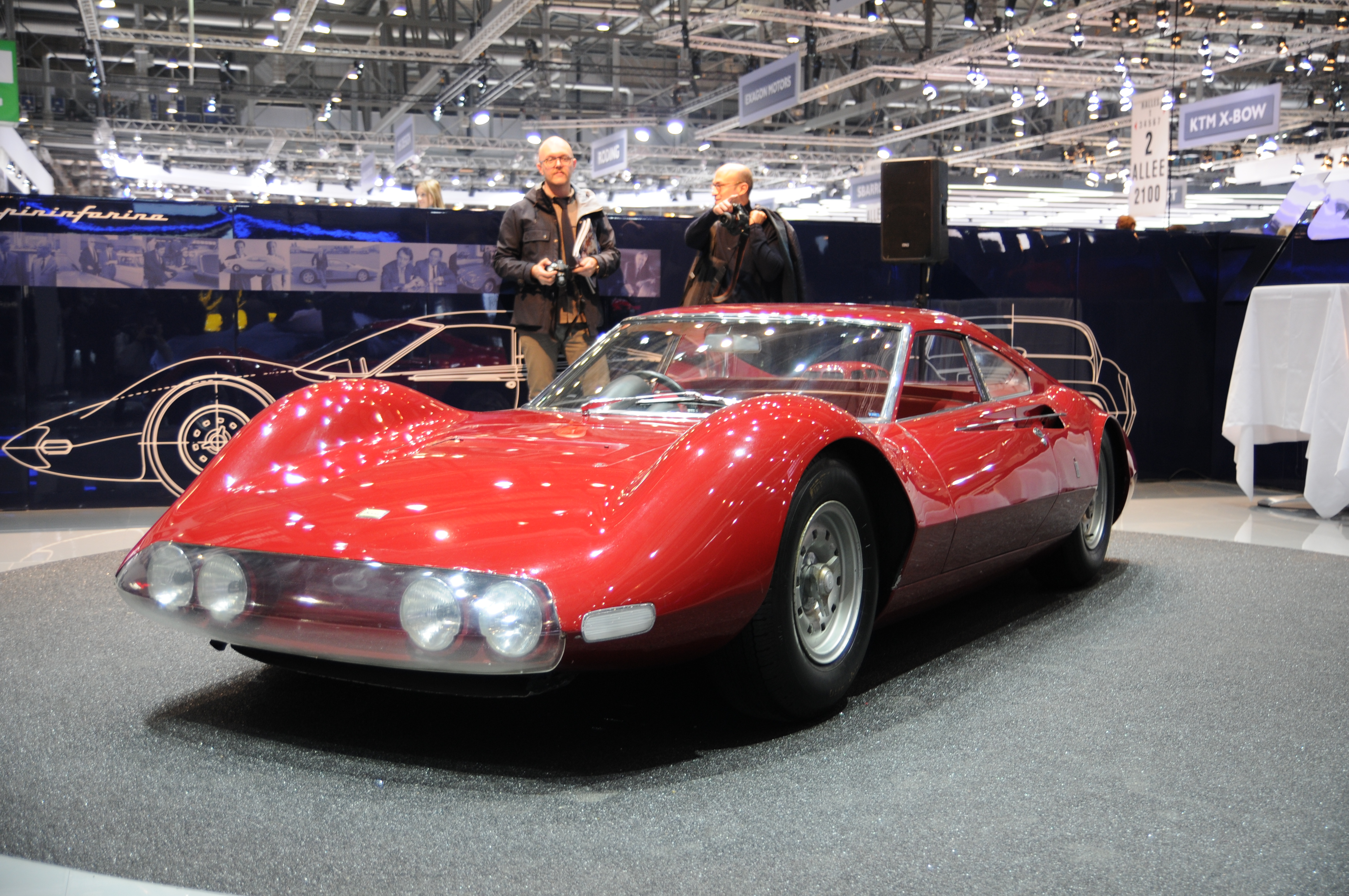
Dino Berlinetta Speciale

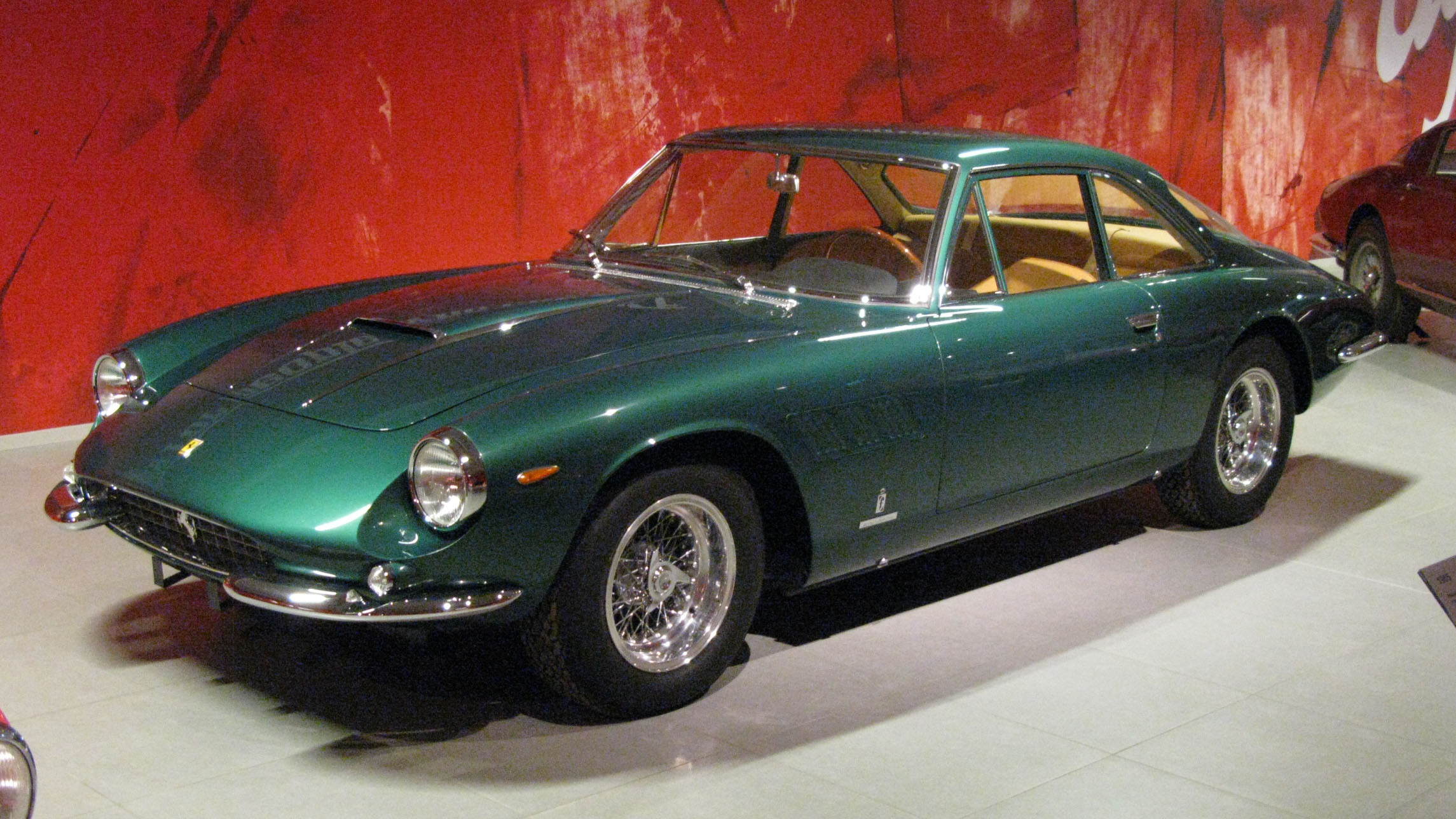
Ferrari 500 Superfast

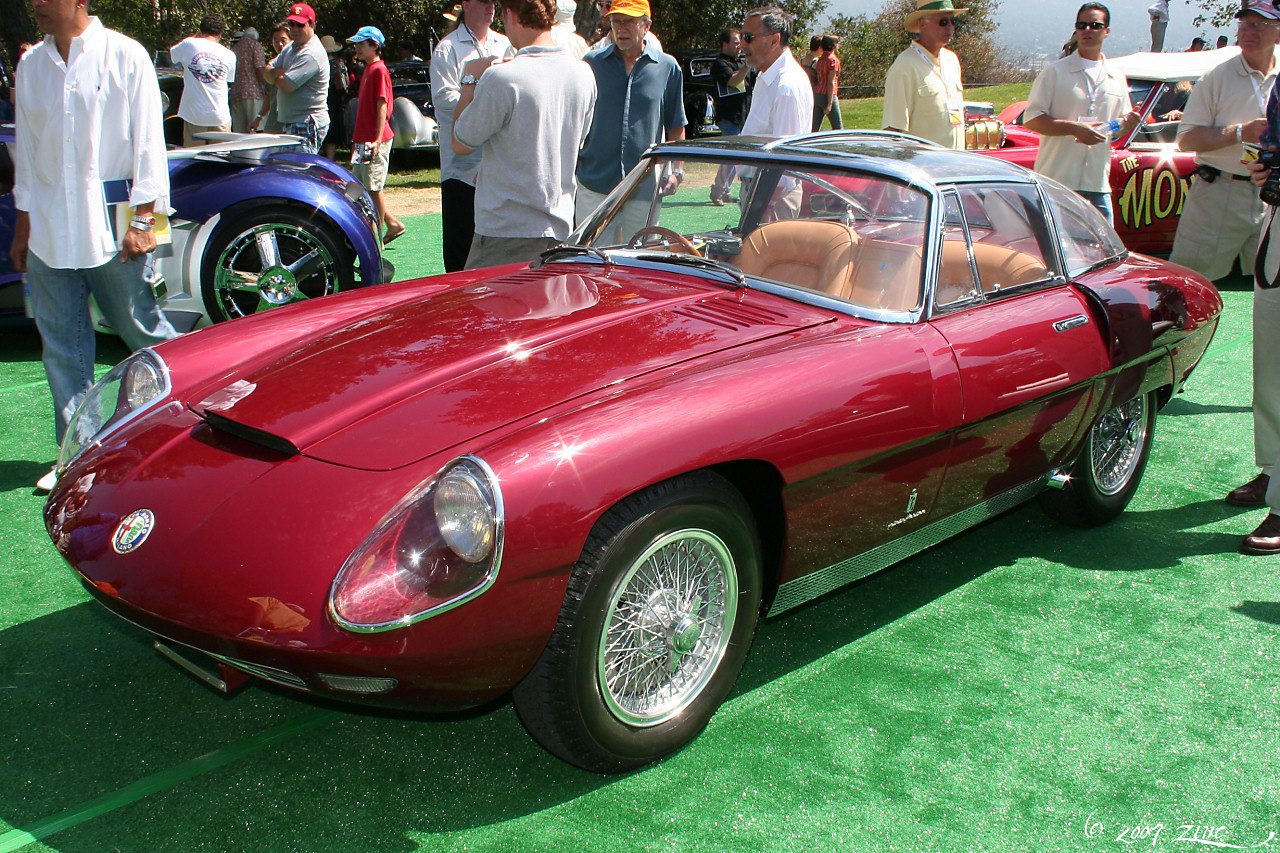
Alfa Romeo 6C 3000 CM Superflow

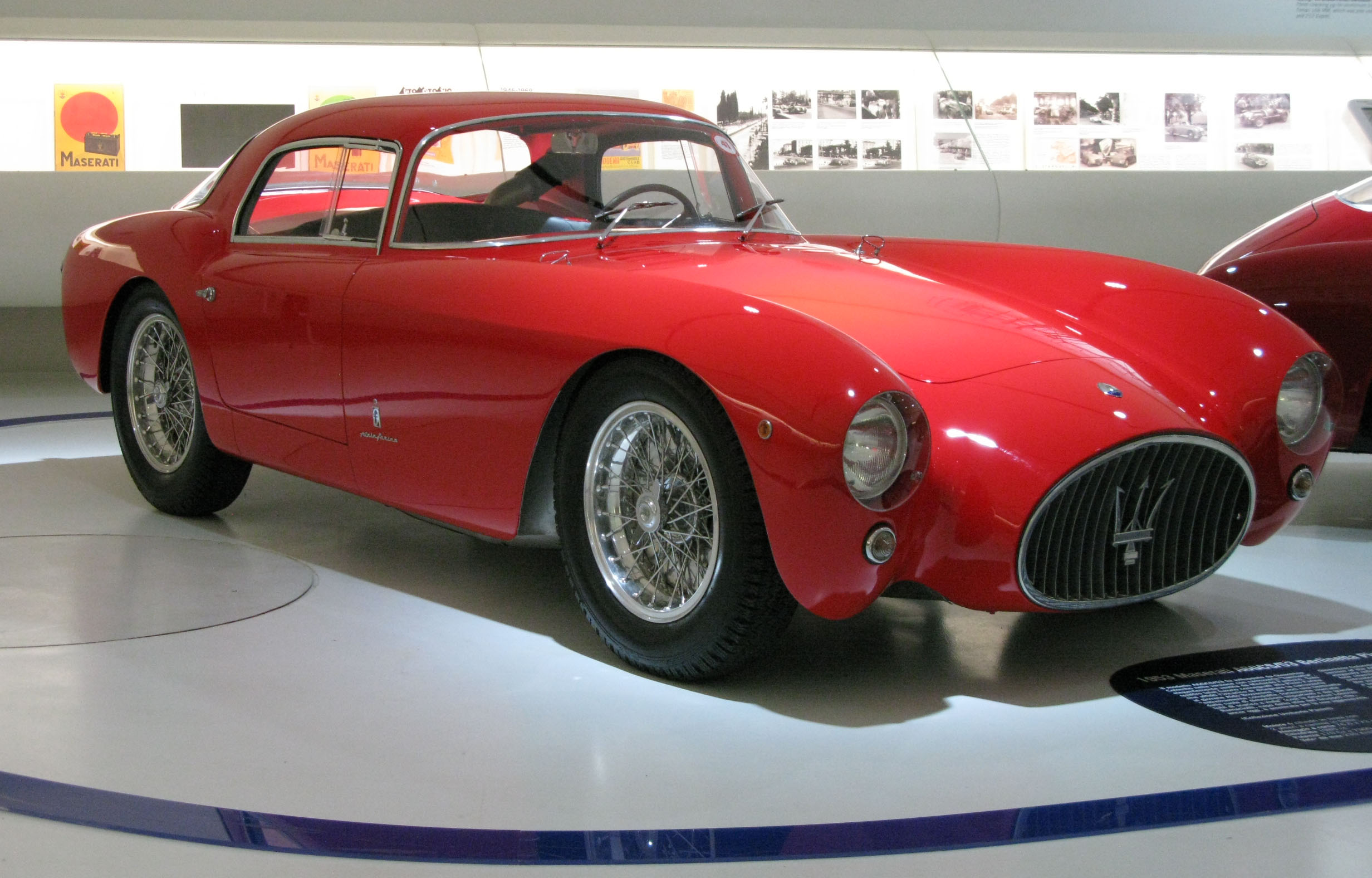
Maserati A6GCS Pinin Farina
