= Alfa Romeo 2uettottanta =

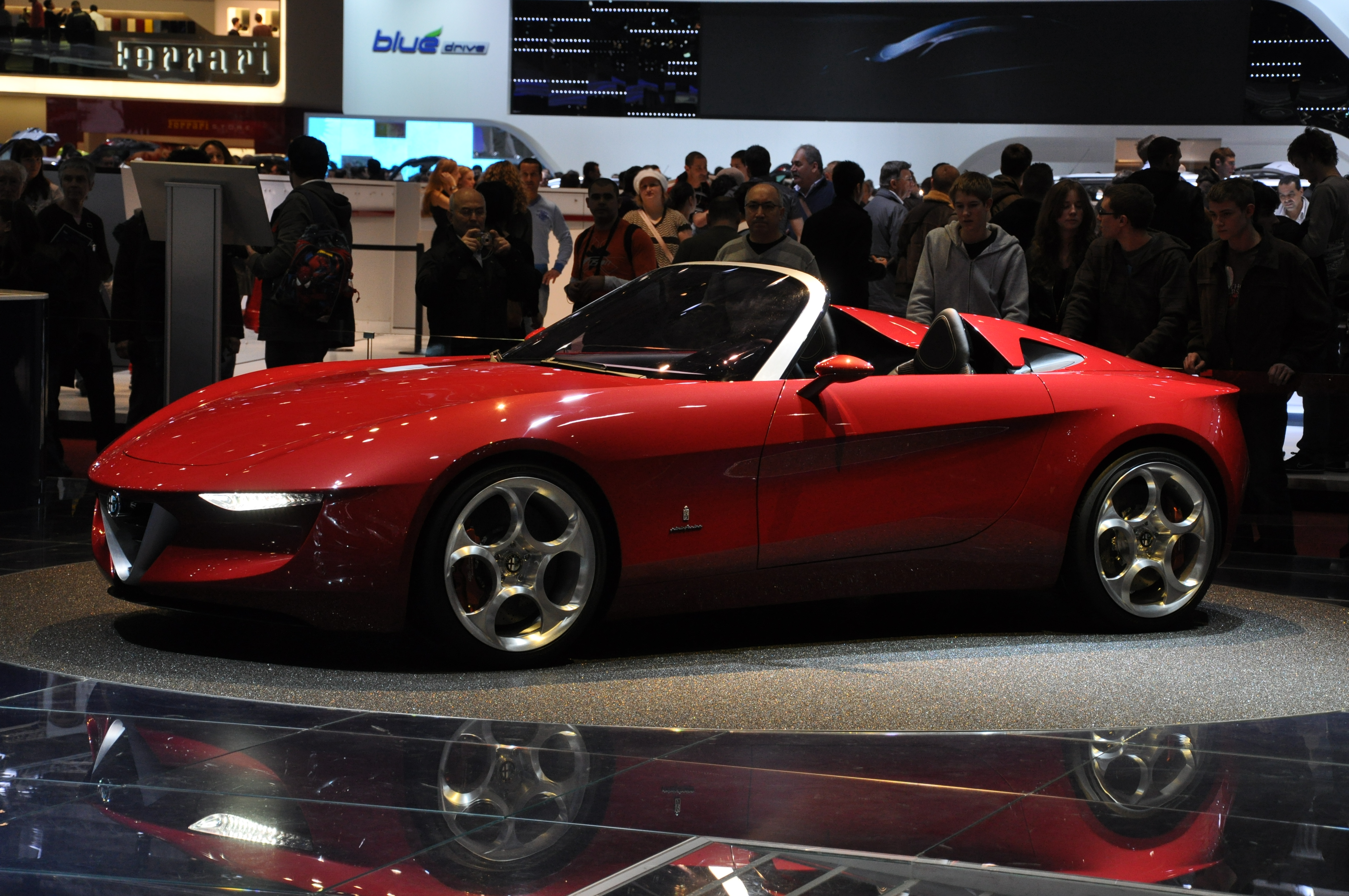

Overview
- Manufacturer: Alfa Romeo
- Production: 2010
- Assembly: Italy
- Designer: Lowie Vermeersch at Pininfarina

Body and chassis
- Class: Concept car
- Body style: 2-seater spider (roadster)
- Layout: FR layout

Powertrain
- Engine: 1750 cc turbo I4

Dimensions
- Wheelbase: 2,500 mm (98.4 in)
- Length: 4,212.6 mm (165.9 in)
- Width: 1,797 mm (70.7 in)
- Height: 1,280 mm (50.4 in)

The Alfa Romeo 2uettottanta is a 2010 Pininfarina concept car and a tribute to mark the 80th anniversary of Pininfarina and the centenary of Alfa Romeo. It is also a tribute to the Duetto Spider.

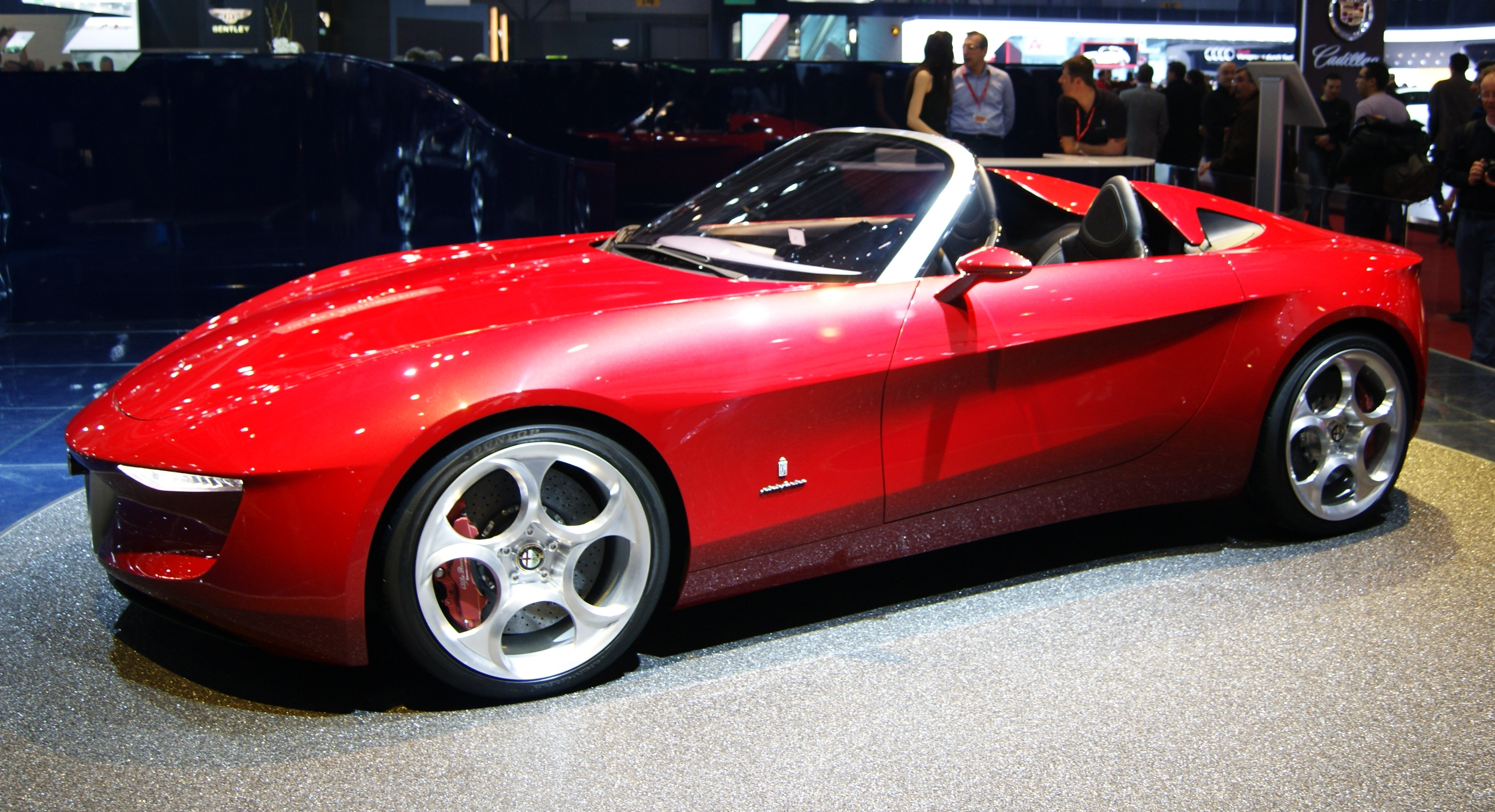
Alfa Romeo 2uettottanta

== Context ==
The 2uettottanta concept is Pininfarina's vision for how a next-generation Alfa spider should look. The 2uettottanta represents the culmination of the long-standing partnership between the two Italian firms, and pays tribute to the iconic 60s-era Duetto roadster. The 2 in the name refers to its two-seater configuration, "2uetto" to the influence of Alfa's classic Duetto model, and ottanta – 80 in Italian – to the number of years since Pininfarina was founded. It was made to be a celebratory car aiming to replicate the "passion" of the two brands. The way the name is spelled often leads to confusion. The first character is not a 2, as is often presumed, but a capital manuscript D as it was written in the Renaissance.

== Design ==
The 2uettottanta's red bodywork was inspired by the typical Alfa Romeo paintwork. It is 1,797 mm (70.7 in) wide, 4,212.6 mm (165.9 in) long, 1,280 mm (50.4 in) high, and has a wheelbase of 2,500 mm (98.4 in). The car features design cues from the Alfa Romeo Duetto and has Alfa Romeo's traditional feature of a triangle with the Alfa Romeo emblem on the front. The bodywork features soft curves with a central line at the front end. To the sides of the Alfa Romeo emblem, there are two triangular air inlets. The headlights, which used the latest LED technologies, are set under the car's main body line. A carbon band in the lower part of the front end acts as a splitter and directs airflow towards the rear. The back is characterized by two bumps which create the roll-bars at the back of the seats. The interior features sports seats and a retro-styled three-spoke steering wheel. The driving position is low to the ground and the seatback is steeply raked. The major controls are placed around the steering column and on the central tunnel, as well as across the upper dash. The detailing includes glowing white Alfa Romeo badges on the centre of the speedometer and rev counter needles. The gear shifter is finished in machined billet aluminum.

== Specifications ==
The car is equipped with a longitudinally-mounted, turbocharged 1750 cc four-cylinder engine, a tribute to the 1750 Veloce from 1968, one of many versions derived from the famous "Osso di Seppia" (Cuttlefish). Power is delivered to the rear wheels through a paddle-shifted twin-clutch transmission.
