= Alfa Romeo Gloria =

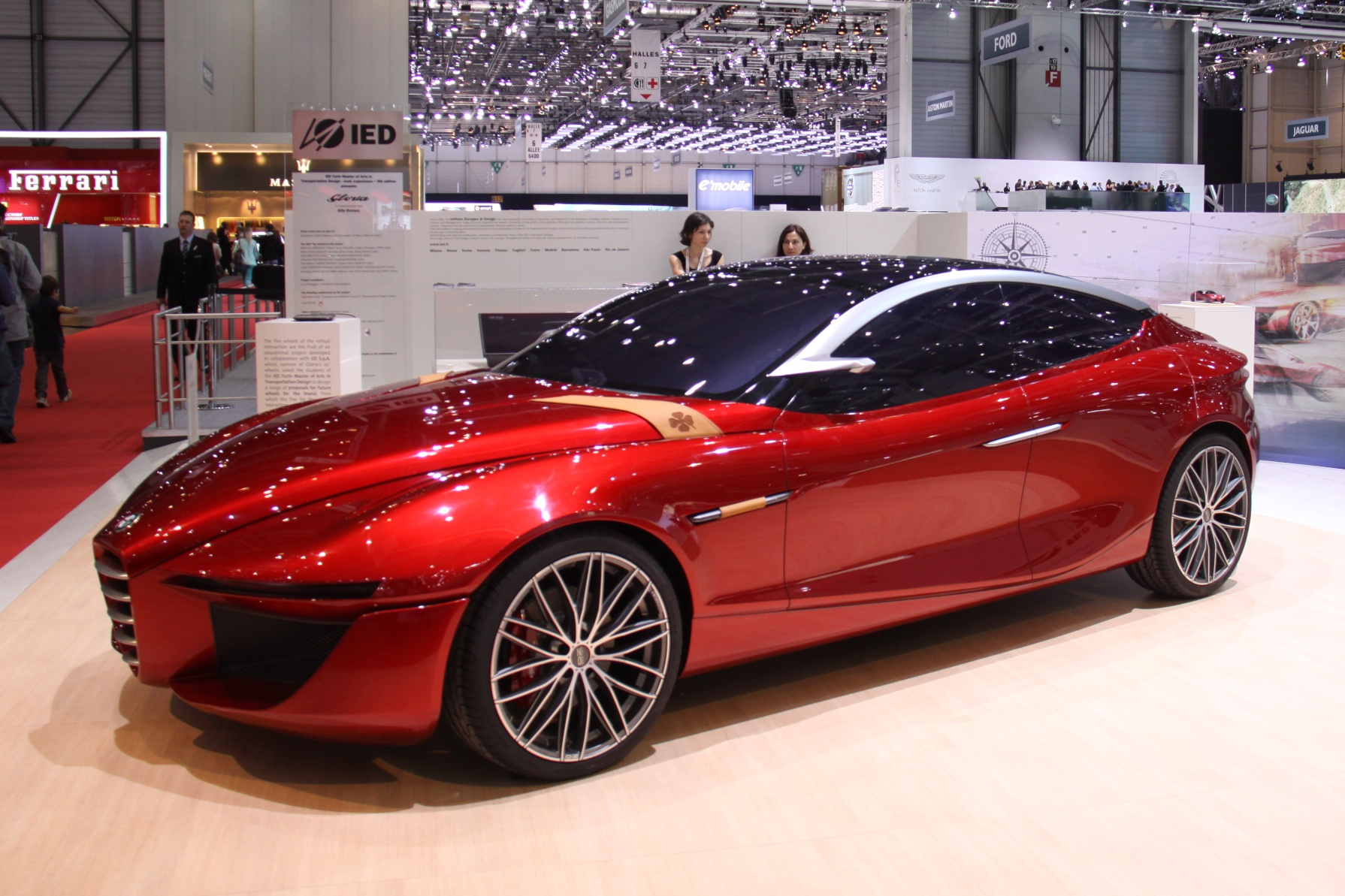

Overview
- Manufacturer: Alfa Romeo
- Production: 2013 (Concept car)
- Designer: European Design Institute

Body and chassis
- Class: Compact executive car (D)
- Body style: 4-door saloon
- Layout: Front-engine, rear-wheel-drive
- Doors: Conventional doors (front); Coach Doors (rear)

Powertrain
- Engine: 2.4L V6
- Transmission: 6-speed automatic

Dimensions
- Wheelbase: 114.2 in (2.90 m)
- Length: 185 in (4.70 m)
- Width: 75 in (1.91 m)
- Height: 50 in (1.27 m)

The Alfa Romeo Gloria is a concept compact executive car made by the Italian car manufacturer Alfa Romeo. It was first shown to the public at the Geneva Motor Show in March 2013. Unusually, the concept was designed by 20 students of transportation design at the European Design Institute of Turin.

== Technical details ==
The Gloria is a 4-door saloon with rear suicide doors, sitting on a long 114.2 in (2.90 m) wheelbase, 185 in (4.70 m) overall length, 75 in (1.91 m) overall width and 50 in (1.27 m) overall height.
