= Sbarro (automobile) =

Sports cars brand

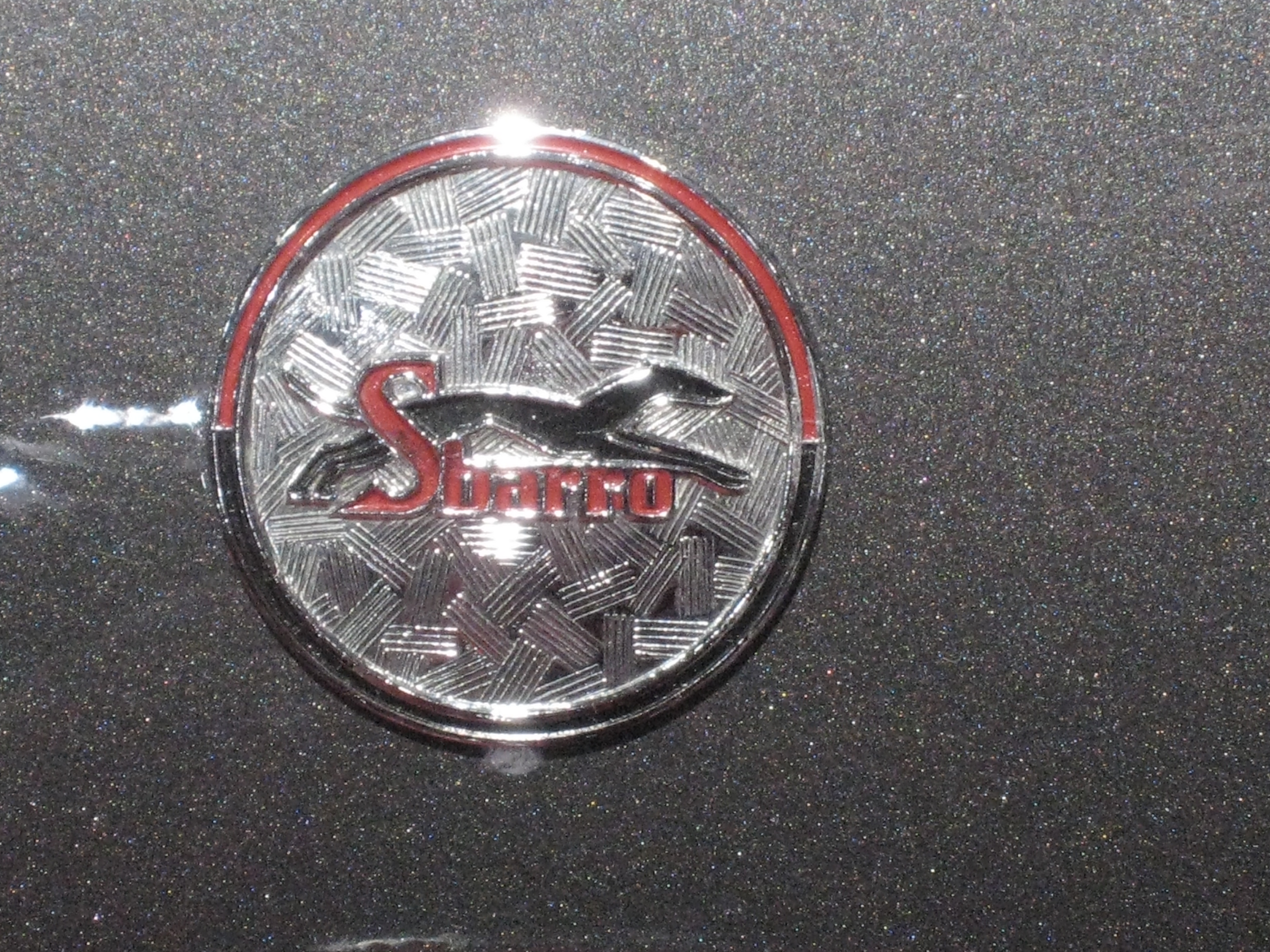
- Industry: Automotive
- Founded: 1971; 55 years ago
- Founder: Franco Sbarro
- Headquarters: Switzerland
- Products: Automobiles

Sbarro is a small Swiss high-performance replica and sports car company founded by Franco Sbarro in 1971.

== Models ==
The first Sbarro offered was a replica of the Lola T70, powered by a 5.4-litre Chevrolet V8. Since then, the company has produced small-series replicas of a variety of models including the BMW 328, Ford GT40, Bugatti Royale and Mercedes-Benz 540K. While the majority of Sbarro's designs remained one-offs, about 135 examples of the BMW 328 Replica were built, making it by far the most common Sbarro vehicle. A few other models were built in smaller runs, usually in the single digits.

Some significant models have included the mid-engine Tiger (powered by a 6.3-liter Mercedes-Benz M100 V8), the Stash (offered as a 2+2 coupé or convertible), and the extremely wedge-shaped Challenge of the mid-1980s. In the name of aerodynamics, the Challenge dispensed with traditional mirrors and may have been the first car sold with a reversing camera. The original Challenge I, presented at the 1985 Geneva Auto Show, had a unique tubular frame and a turbocharged Mercedes-Benz 5-liter V8 engine. Claimed power was 380 PS (279 kW) and the top speed 310 km/h (193 mph). Other special features were twin rear wheels and a biplane rear wing which angled upwards at up to 18 degrees under braking, to add downforce and stabilize the car. Sbarro also intended to provide each customer with a radio-controlled replica of the car. The 1986 Challenge 2+2 was developed from this; it (and the succeeding Challenge III) had a planned production run of ten cars and used Porsche 930 underpinnings. There was also a "Baby Challenge" for children, presented in 1986. It was powered by a 350-cc, single-cylinder Honda engine.

Sbarro also collaborated with Pierre Cardin for a mid-engined, turbocharged version of the Stash released in Paris 1975. While the 109 kW (148 PS; 146 hp), 1.8-litre Volkswagen K70 engine provided impressive performance for the time, Cardin's special interior with its striping, special upholstery, and zip-fastened pockets was the main attraction. All Sbarros have been extremely limited production vehicles - for instance, only five Stash seem to have been built, even though at least three engines, two bodystyles, and the Pierre Cardin special edition were on offer.

Another series of project cars of the early 1980s sold to private customers are the Super Twelve and Super Eight. The 1982 Super Twelve had bespoke bodywork looking like a squared-off hatchback, albeit with unusually broad fenders and many other hints at potency. The mid-mounted engine was a straight twelve-cylinder unit constructed from two Kawasaki Z1300 six-cylinder motorcycle engines, with the driveshaft in the center. Claimed maximum power was 260 PS (191 kW). The 1984 Super Eight featured largely the same bodywork, but received the marginally more sane eight-cylinder engine from the Ferrari 308.

Sbarro has also built dozens of concept cars and custom high-performance vehicles for private customers. Some of the more recent concepts are the Christelle, Millennium Coupé, and Picasso (2001), GT12 (2000) and GT1 (1999). Some of these feature hubless wheels, a recurring Sbarro concept.

At the Geneva Motor Show on 3 March 2011, Sbarro unveiled the Evoluzione concept car. Sbarro's concept car had a 1.8-litre turbocharged four-cylinder engine from Audi. It output 134 kW of power. The Evoluzione was built without normal production car constraints, as the rear exposes the entire rear suspension set-up as well as the engine. Overall, the design took 25 students just 13 weeks to complete.

== Espera ==
Established over 20 years ago by Franco Sbarro, Sbarro Espera school offers training in car design and mechanics, and combines theory and practice.

== Gallery ==
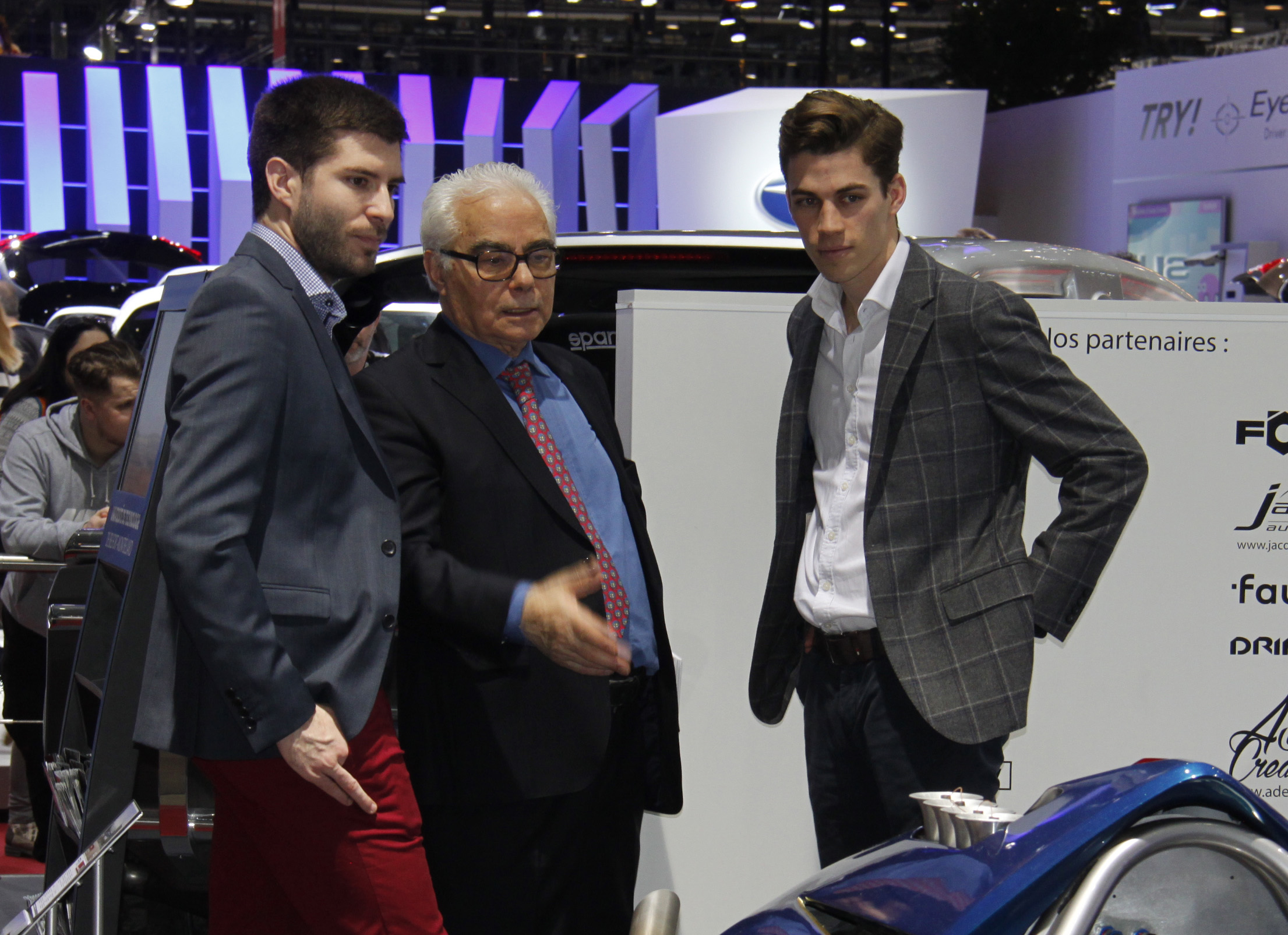
Franco Sbarro at the 2018 Geneva Motor Show

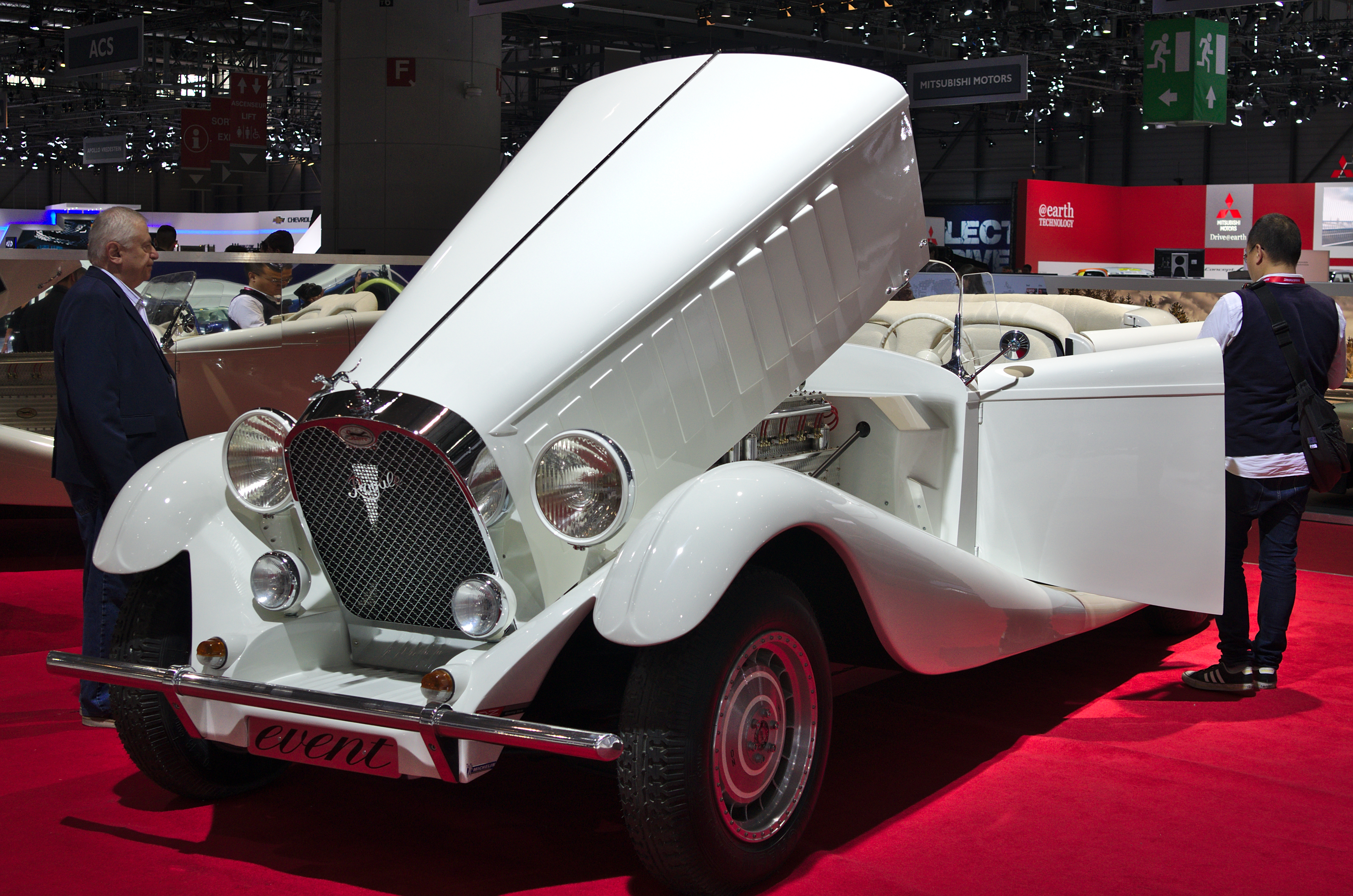
Sbarro Royale

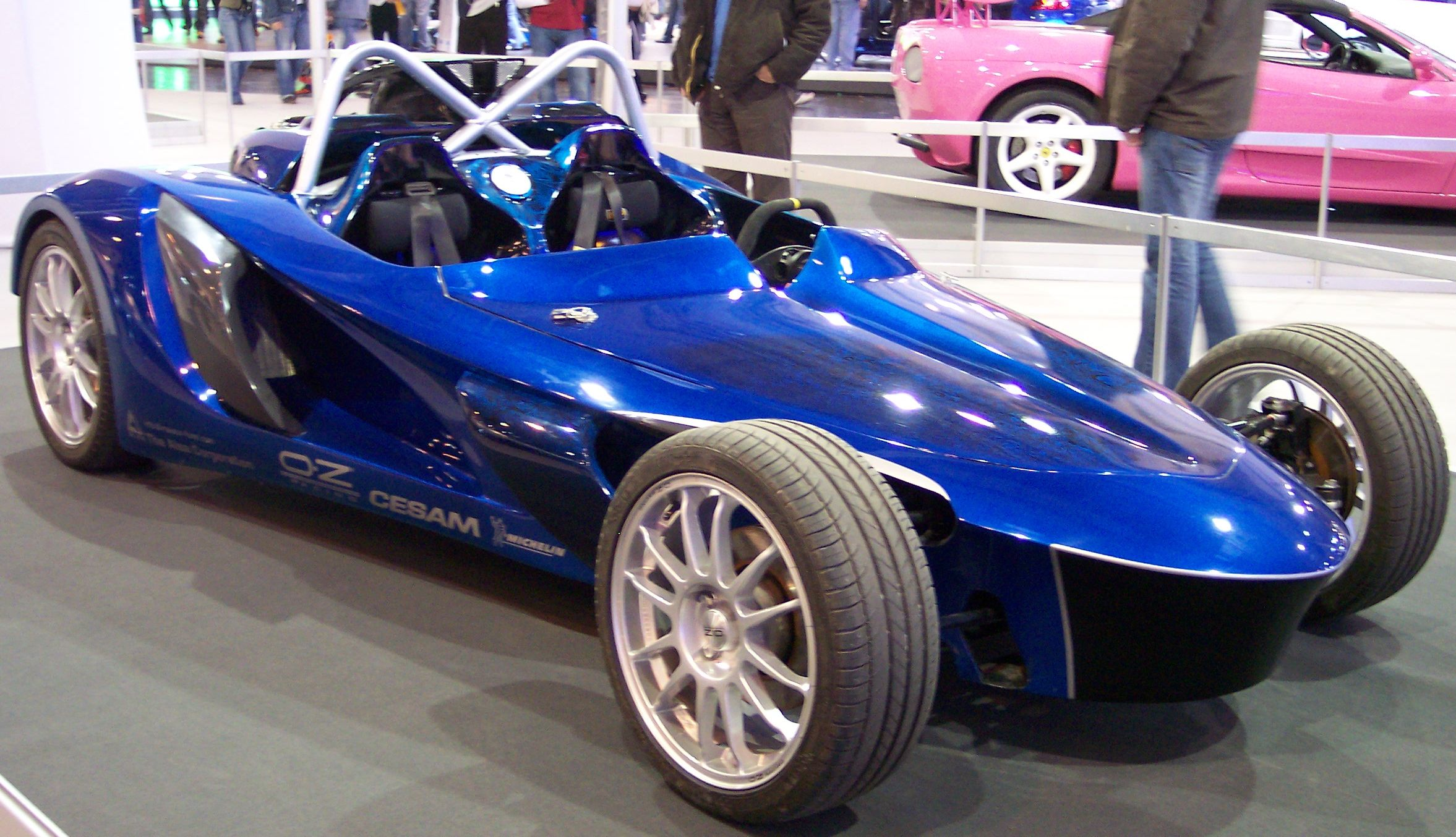
Sbarro Espera ESP 9

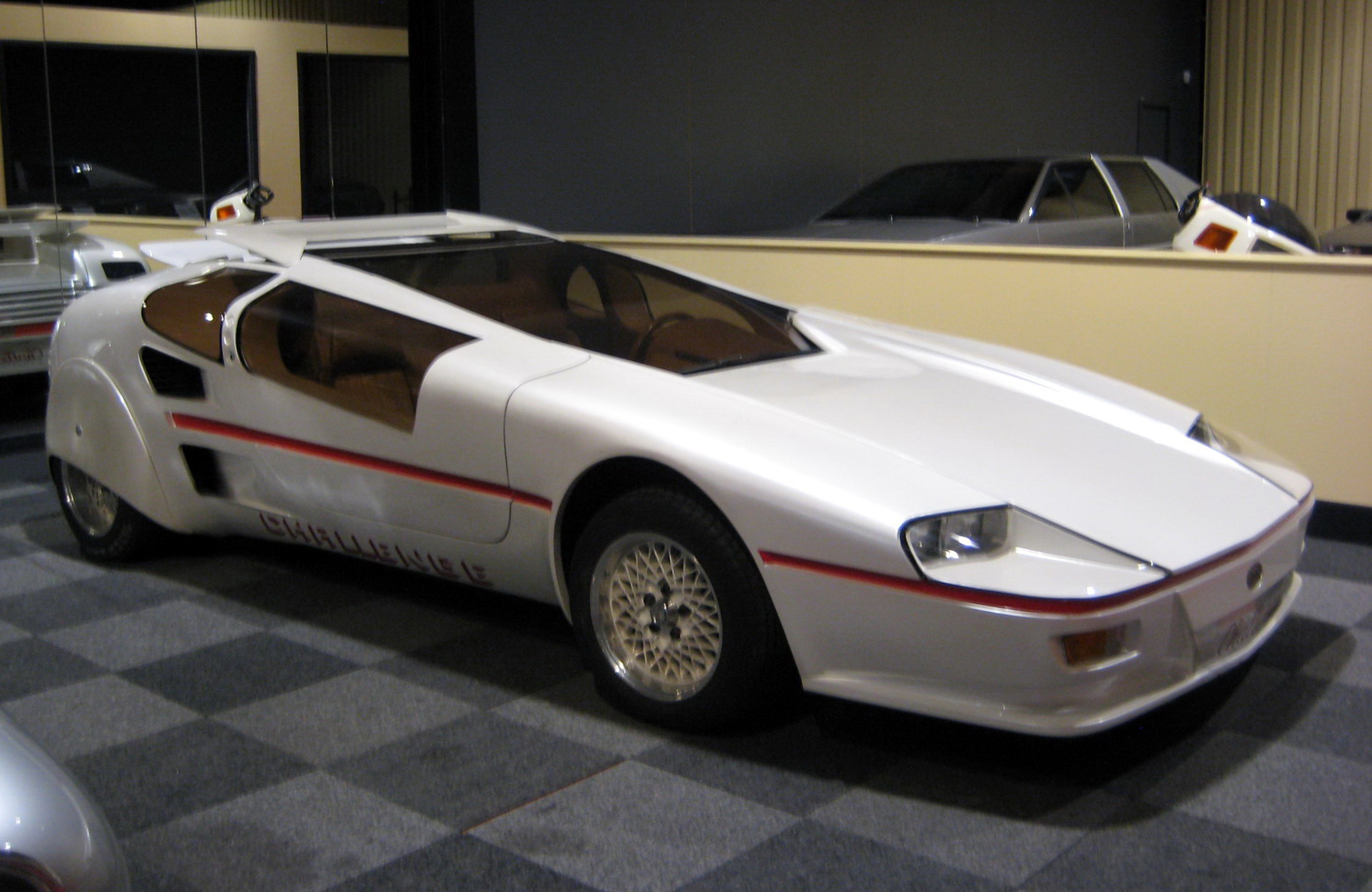
Sbarro Challenge I

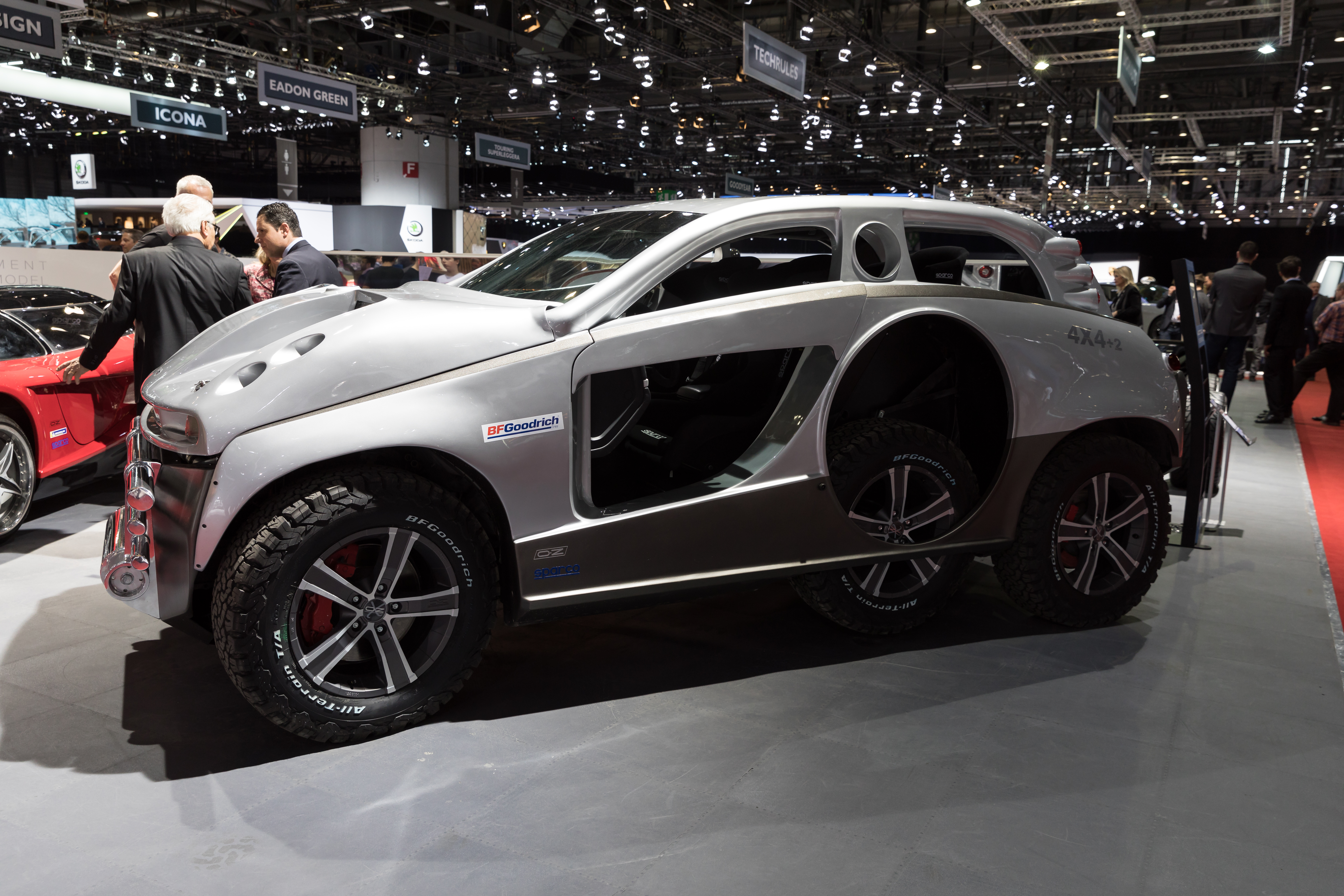
Sbarro 4x4+2 Concept at the 2018 Geneva International Motor Show

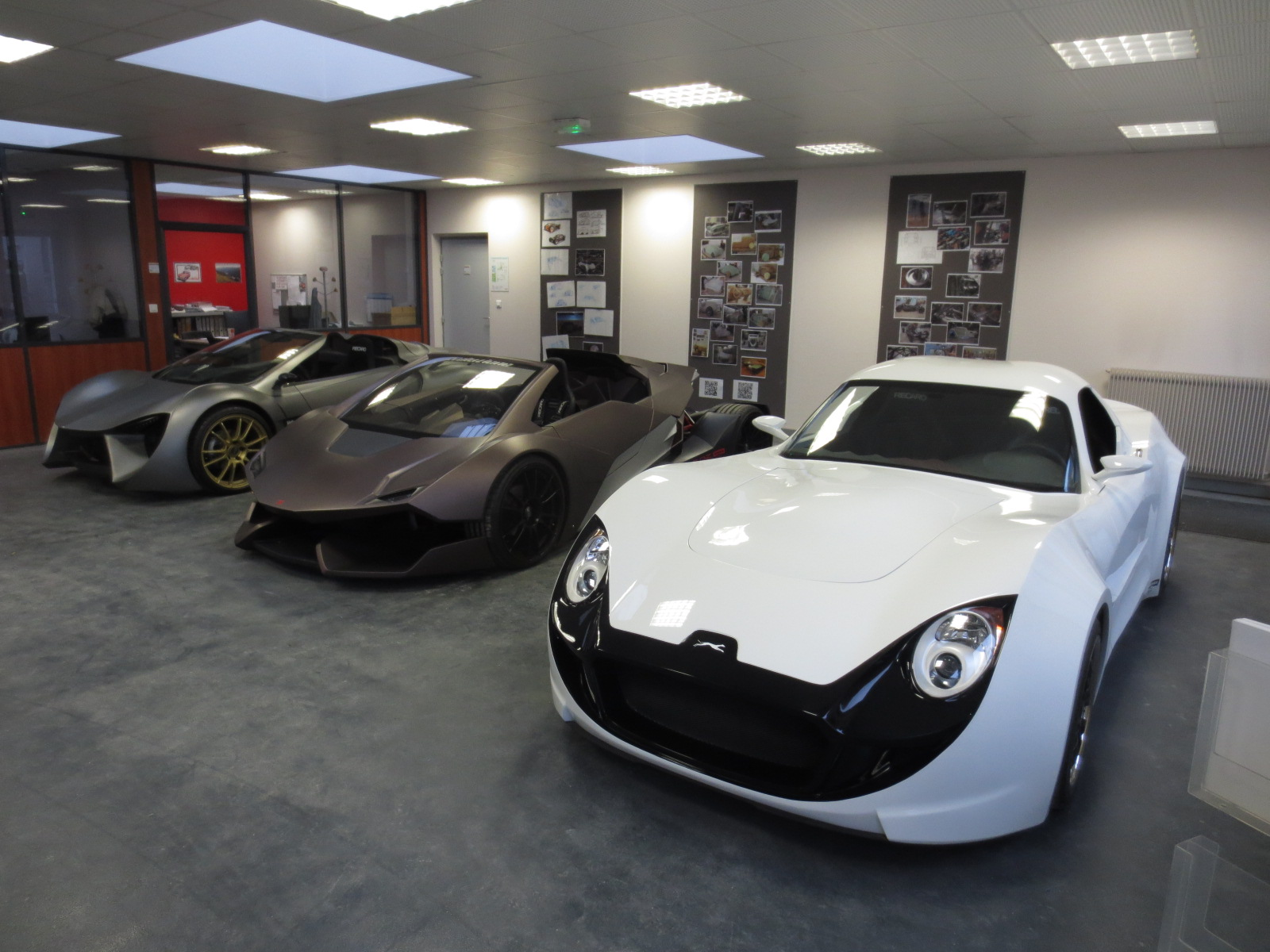
Sbarro Speed R
