= Fioravanti (automotive) =

Fioravanti S.r.l.
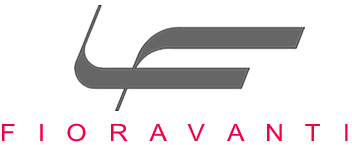
- Type: Società a responsabilità limitata
- Industry: Design
- Founded: Turin, Italy 1987
- Founder: Leonardo Fioravanti
- Headquarters: Moncalieri, Italy
- Area served: Worldwide
- Services: Styling, Engineering, Pre-Series, Testing & Validation, Industrial Design
- Website: fioravanti.it

Fioravanti is an Italian automotive design studio in Moncalieri outside the city of Turin. The company began in 1987 as an architectural practice working on projects in Japan, and since 1991, it has focused its activities on automotive design.

Fioravanti was founded by C.E.O. Leonardo Fioravanti, who worked twenty-four years with Pininfarina on such vehicles as the Ferrari Daytona, Dino road cars, Ferrari 512 Berlinetta Boxer, the Ferrari 308 GTB, Ferrari 288 GTO and the Ferrari F40.

In the 21st century, the company continued with independent creations, such as in 2004 with the Fioravanti Kite and collaborations with well-known car manufacturers such as in 2008 when the Piedmontese body shop designed the Ferrari SP1 for Ferrari. This model, made as a one-off, was the first car to come from Ferrari's "Special Projects" division, a program by Ferrari to create one-of-a-kind cars in collaboration with the most famous names in Italian design, for private clients. In 2006 the Fioravanti Skill was presented, based on the Fiat Grande Punto.

In recent years, Fioravanti have also produced a number of restomod versions of existing sports cars through their "Evoluzioni Technice" department. These include a version of the Alfa Romeo 8C Competizione with a gated manual transmission and a number of other changes, a Ferrari Berlinetta Boxer with upgraded ignition and fueling systems, a Ferrari Testarossa with more power and upgraded suspension, and a Ferrari F40 with upgraded suspension, brakes, and steering to make the car safer and more usable.

== Cars styled by Fioravanti ==
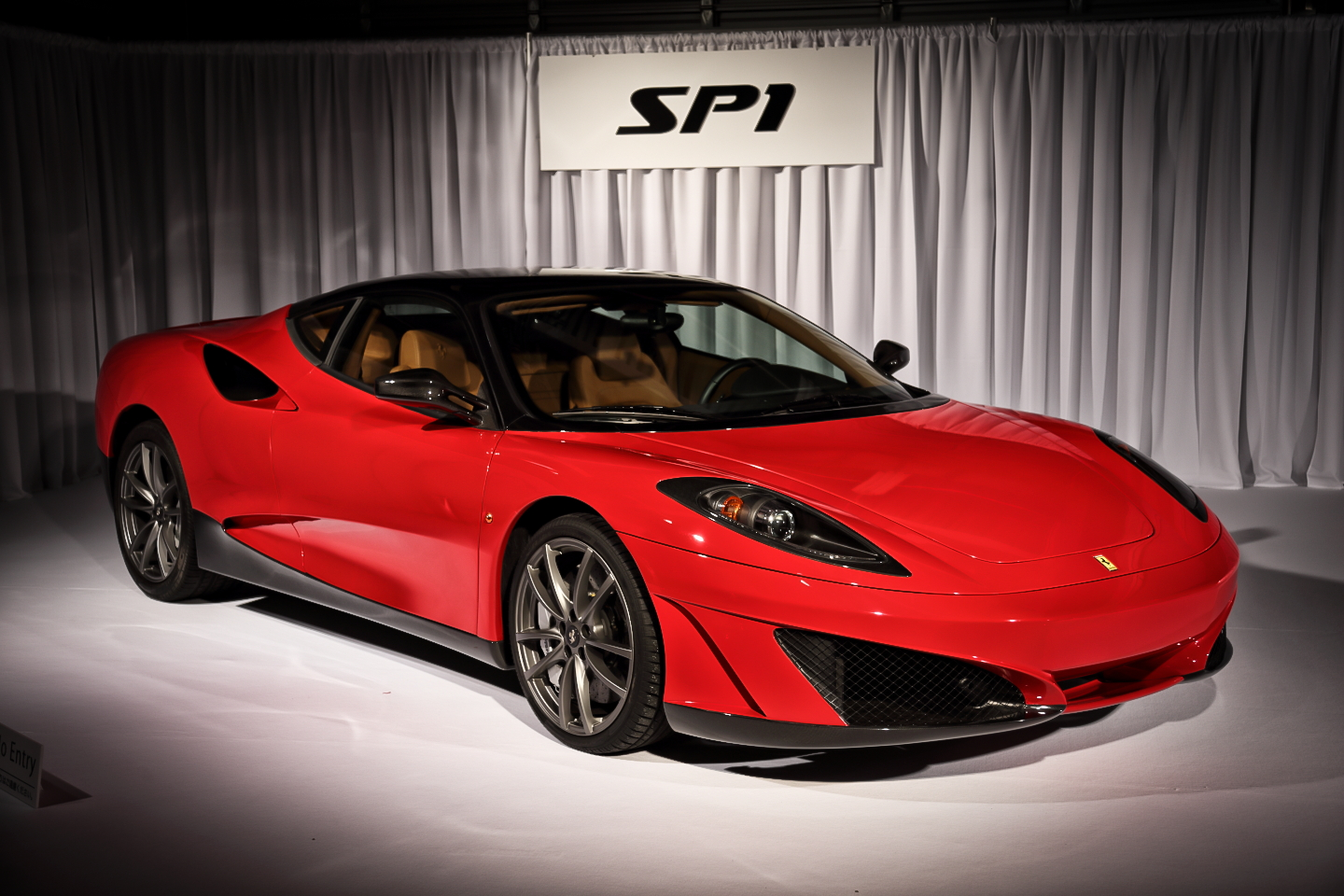
2008 Ferrari SP1, designed by Fioravanti

=== Concept cars and one offs ===
- 1994 Fioravanti Sensiva
- 1996 Fioravanti Nyce
- 1996 Fioravanti Flair
- 1998 Fioravanti F100
- 2000 Fioravanti F100r
- 2000 Fioravanti Tris
- 2001 Alfa Romeo Vola
- 2002 Fioravanti YAK
- 2004 Fioravanti Kyte
- 2005 Fioravanti Kandahar
- 2006 Fioravanti Skill
- 2007 Fioravanti Thalia
- 2008 Fioravanti Hidra
- 2008 Ferrari SP1
- 2009 Fioravanti LF1
- 2013 BAIC Concept 900
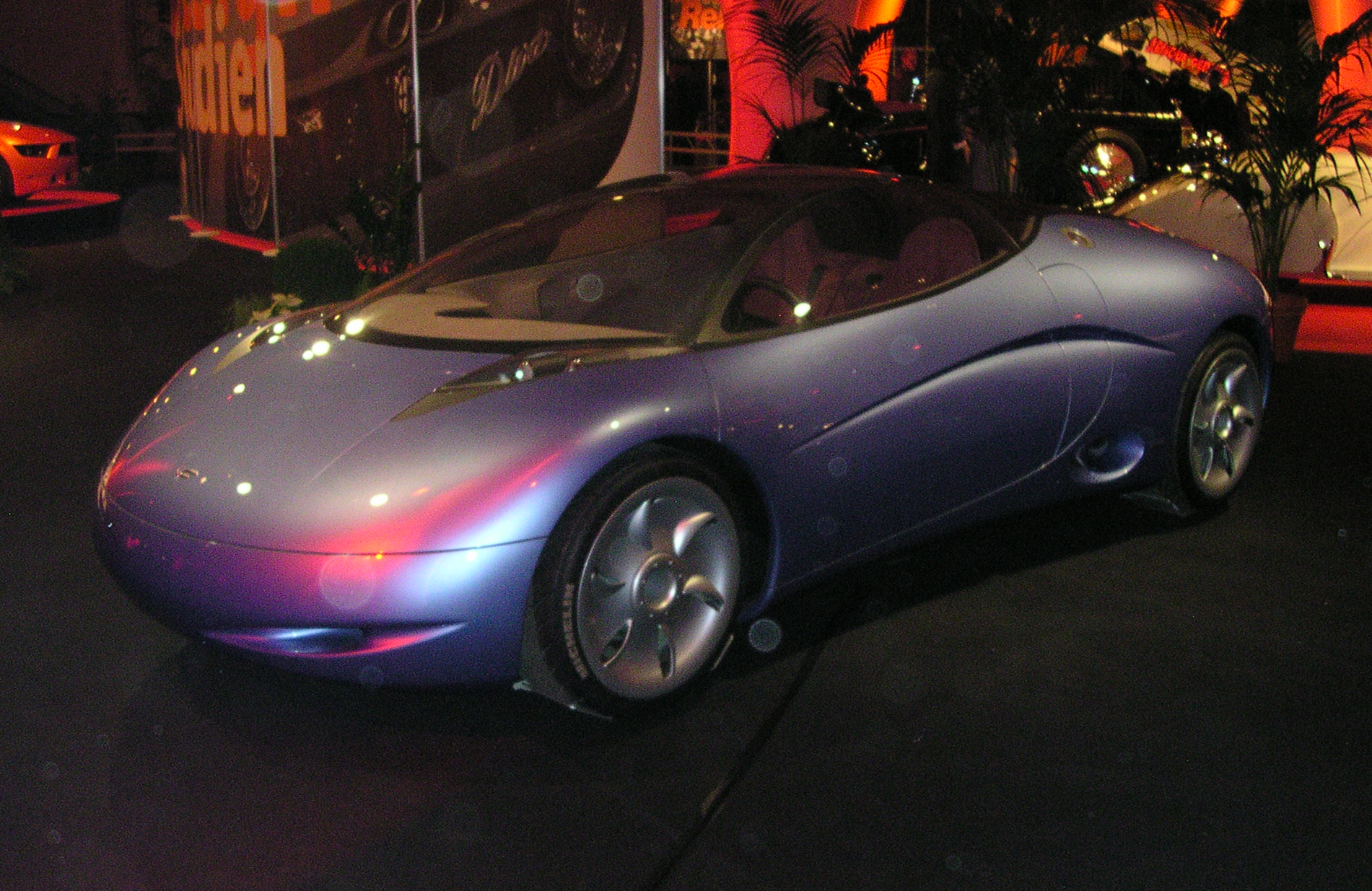
1994 Fioravanti Sensiva

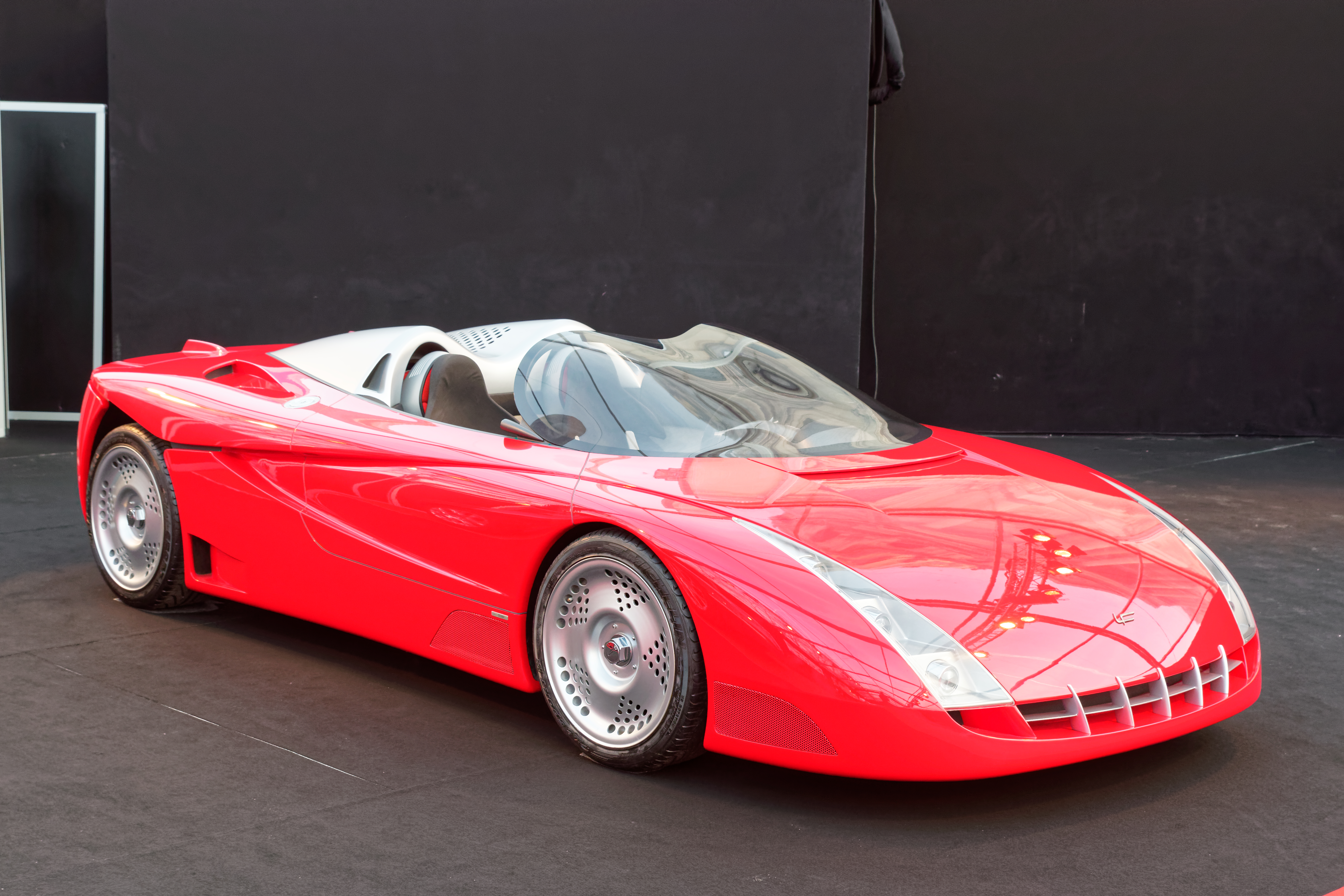
2000 Fioravanti F100r

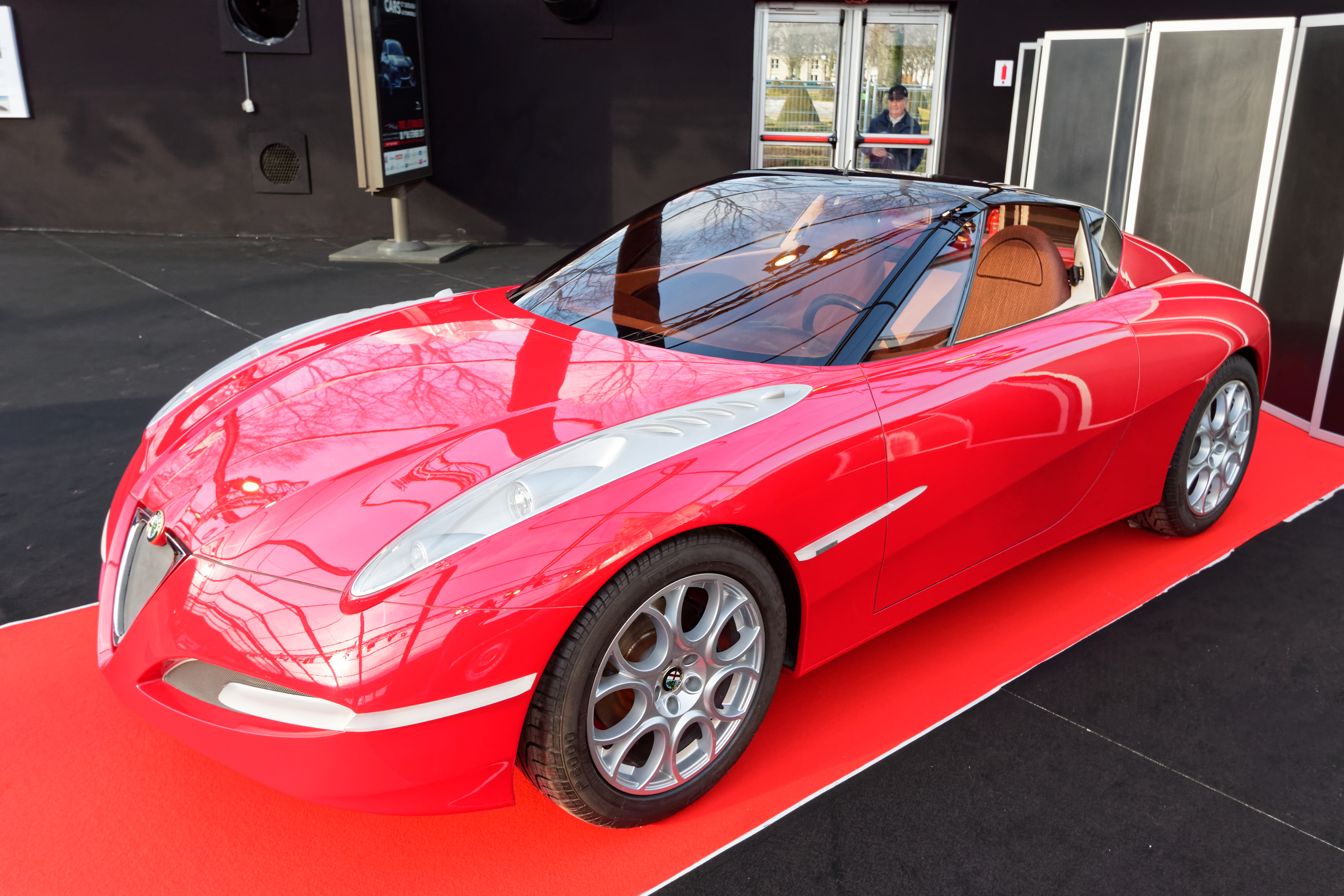
2001 Alfa Romeo Vola

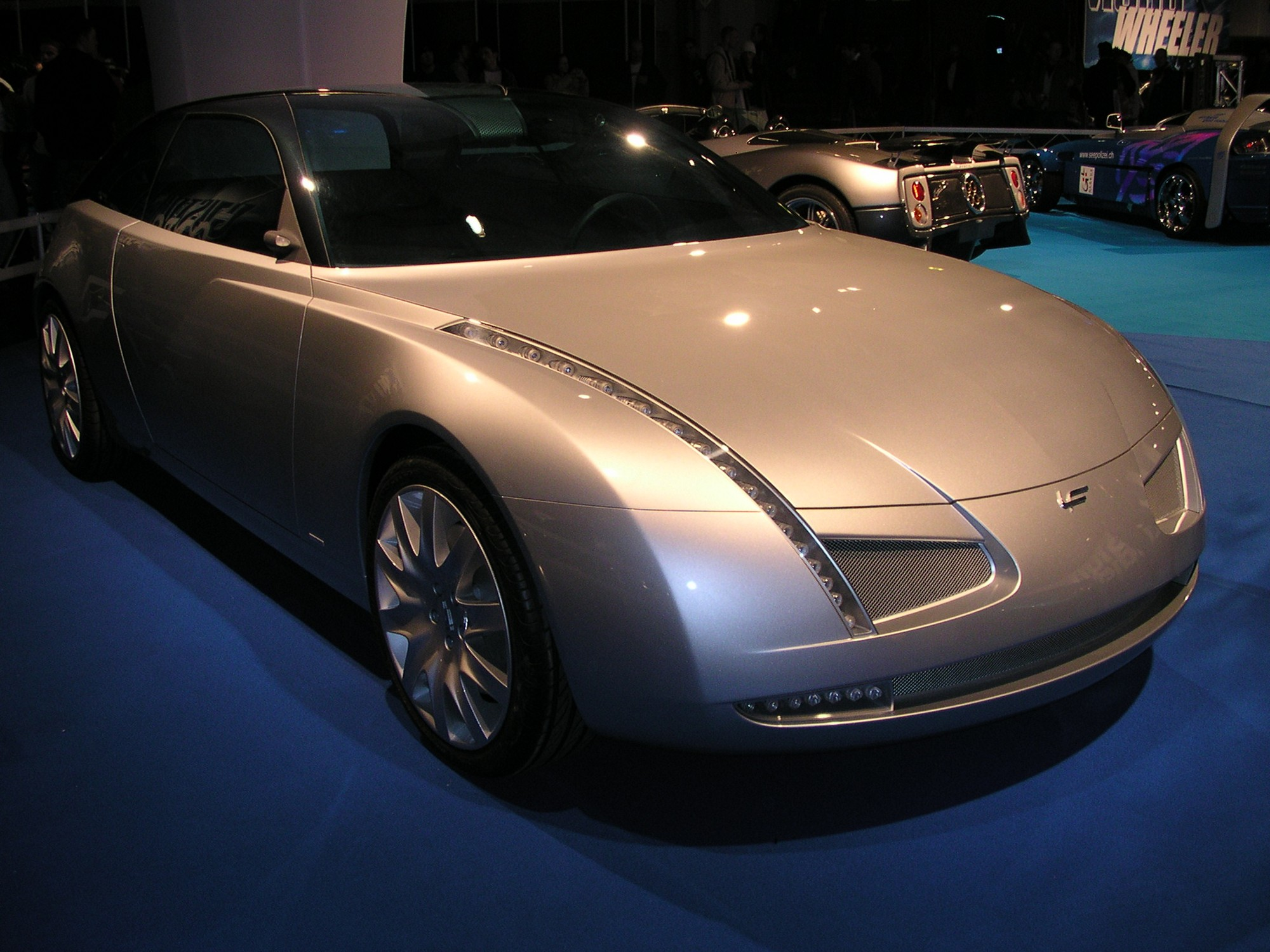
2004 Fioravanti Kite

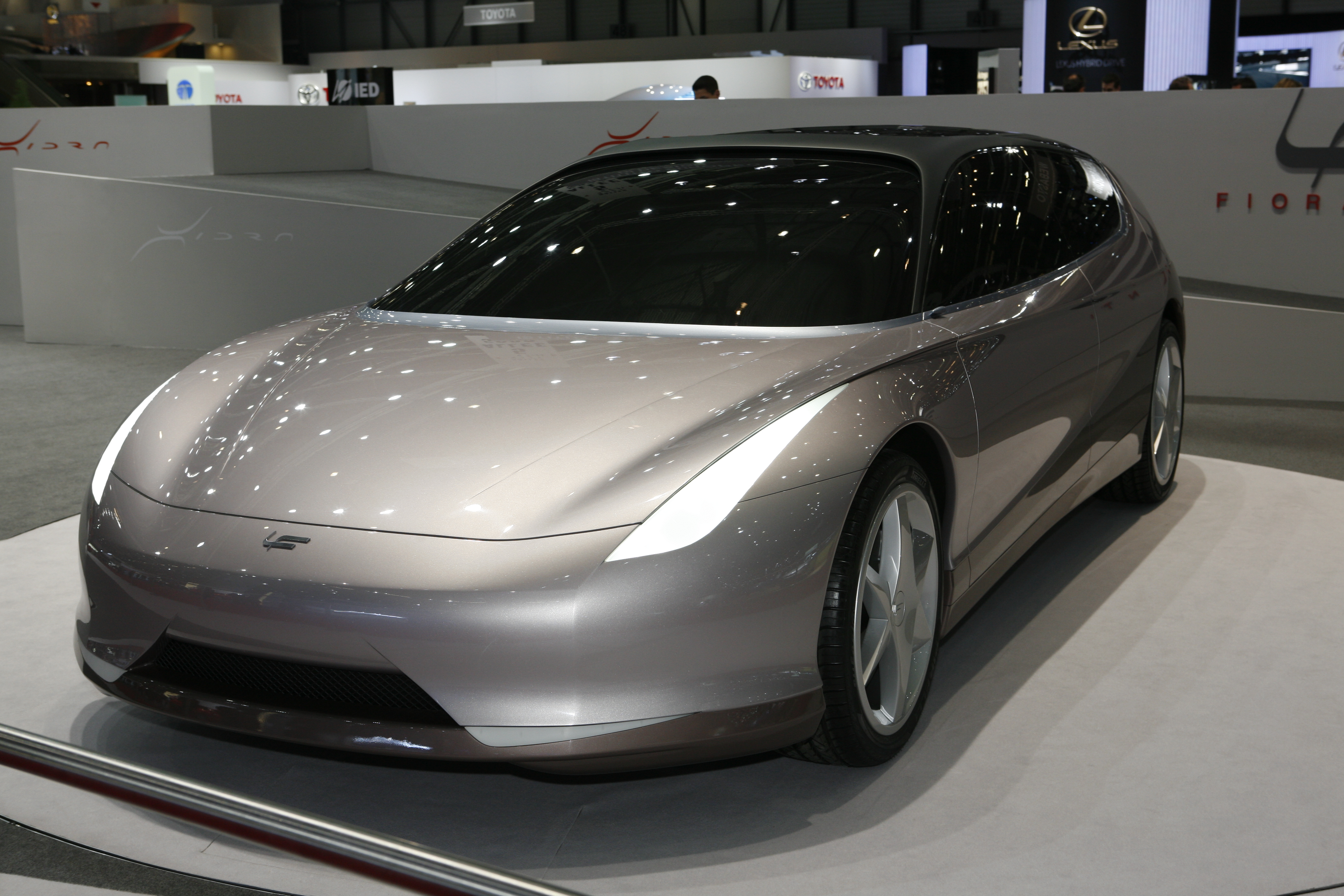
2008 Fioravanti Hidra

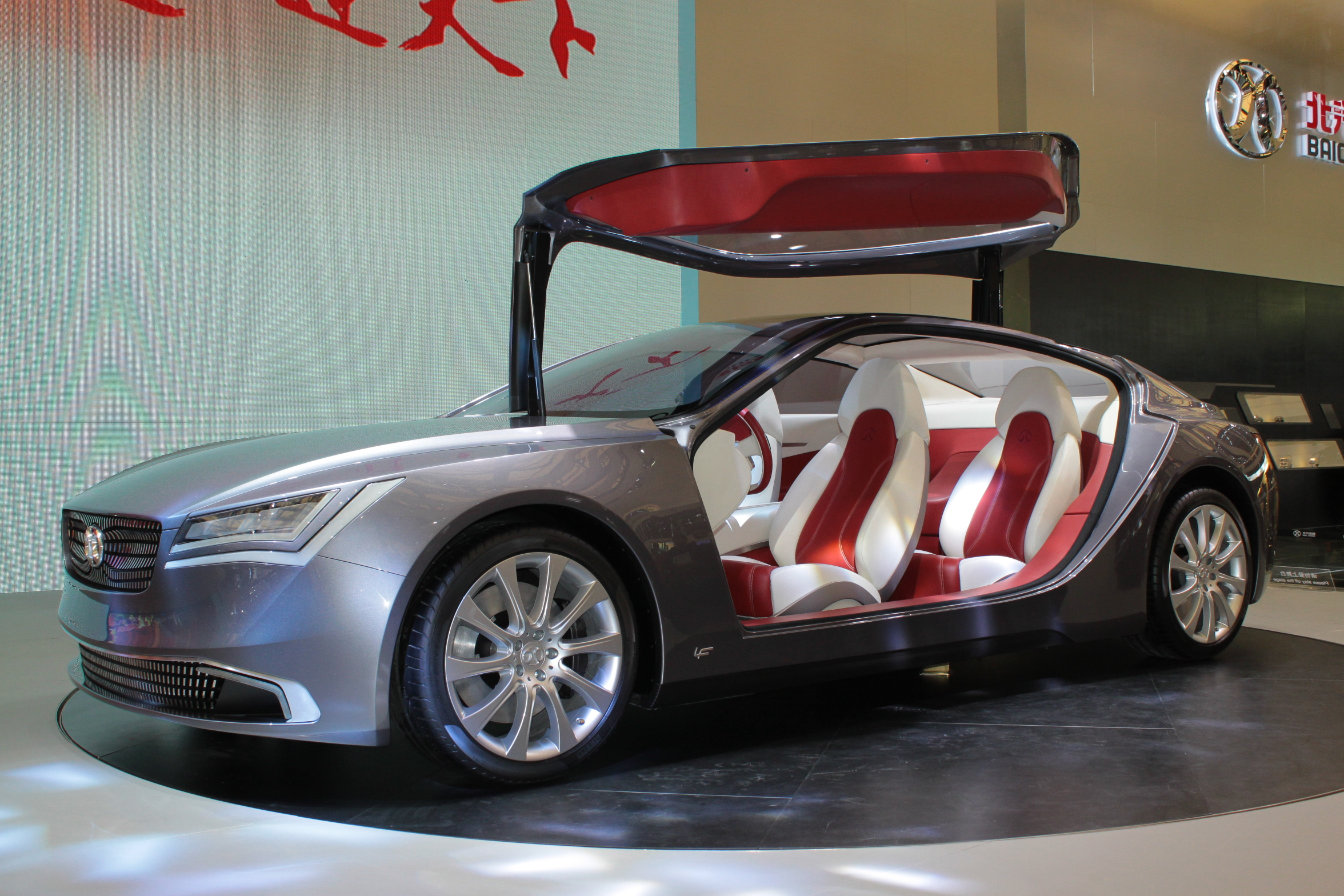
2013 BAIC Concept 900 at AutoShanghai 2013
