= Alfa Romeo GTV and Spider =

Alfa Romeo GTV Alfa Romeo Spider
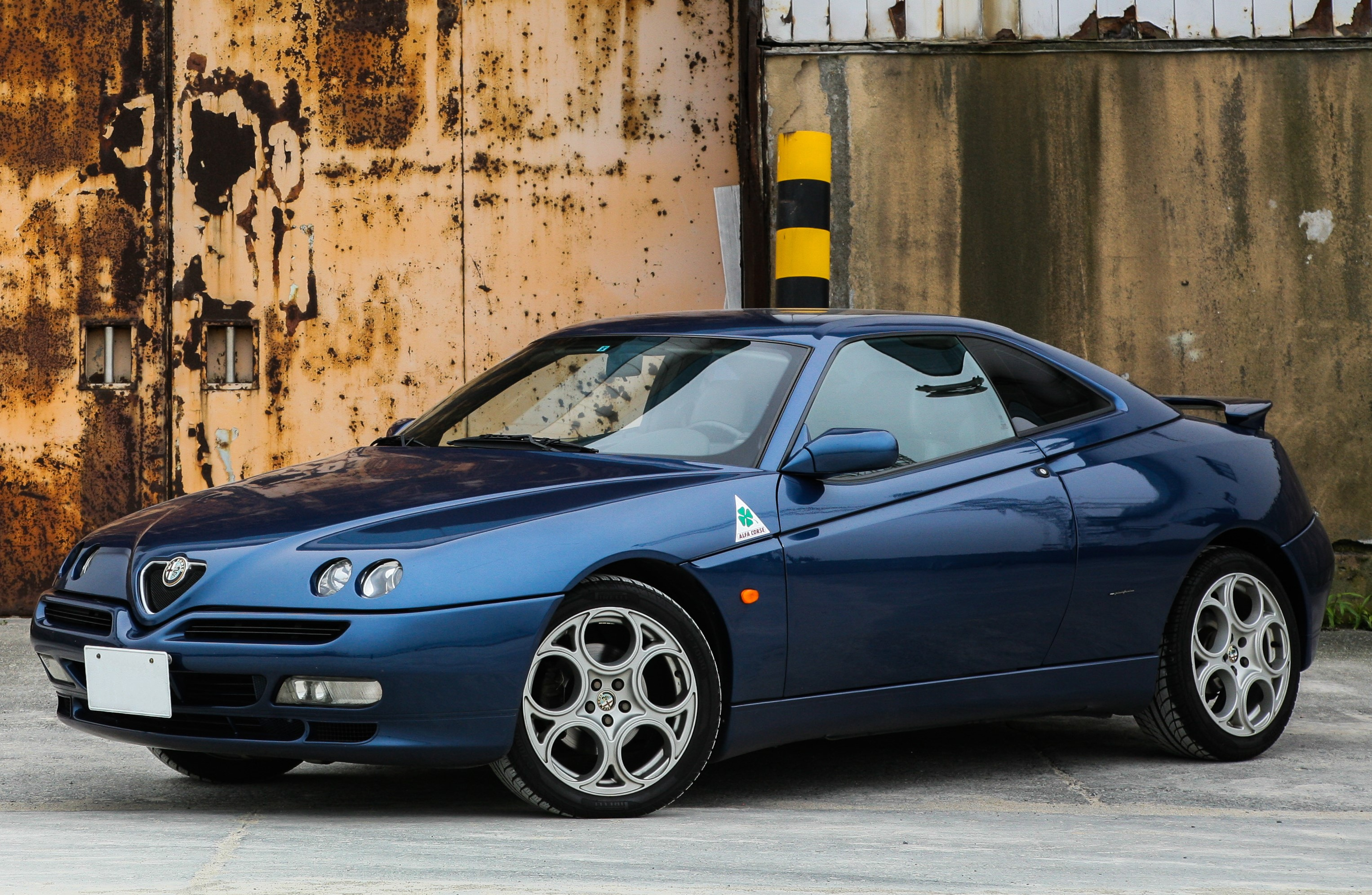
- Alfa Romeo GTV 2.0 V6 TB

Overview
- Manufacturer: Alfa Romeo
- Production: 1993–2006 (Spider); 1994–2005 (GTV)
- Model years: 1995–2006
- Assembly: Italy: Arese, Milan (Alfa Romeo); San Giorgio Canavese, Turin (Pininfarina, from 2000)
- Designer: Enrico Fumia at Pininfarina; Centro Stile Alfa Romeo under Walter de Silva (Interior); Pininfarina (Phase 3)

Body and chassis
- Class: Sports car (S)
- Body style: 2-door 2+2 coupé (GTV); 2-door roadster (Spider)
- Layout: Front-engine, front-wheel-drive
- Platform: Modified Type Two
- Related: Fiat Coupé; Alfa Romeo Vola

Powertrain
- Engine: 1.8 L Twin Spark 16V I4; 2.0 L Twin Spark 16V I4; 2.0 L JTS 16V I4; 2.0 L Busso 12V turbo V6; 3.0 L Busso 12V V6; 3.0 L Busso 24V V6; 3.2 L Busso 24V V6
- Transmission: 5/6-speed manual

Dimensions
- Wheelbase: 2,540 mm (100.0 in)
- Length: 4,285 mm (168.7 in); 4,299 mm (169.3 in) (Phase 3)
- Width: 1,780 mm (70.1 in); 1,776 mm (69.9 in) (Phase 3)
- Height: 1,318 mm (51.9 in); 1,315 mm (51.8 in) (Spider)
- Kerb weight: 1,350–1,470 kg (2,976–3,241 lb)

Chronology
- Predecessor: Alfa Romeo GTV and GTV6 (116); Alfa Romeo Spider (105/115)
- Successor: Alfa Romeo Brera and Spider (939)

The Alfa Romeo GTV and the Alfa Romeo Spider (Type 916) are sports cars produced by the Italian automobile manufacturer Alfa Romeo from 1993 to 2004. The GTV is a 2+2 coupé, while the Spider is a two-seater roadster. Production totaled 38,891 units for the Spider and 42,937 units for the GTV.

The GTV's name (Gran Turismo Veloce–English: Fast Grand Touring) placed it as the successor to the long-discontinued Alfetta GTV coupé, whereas the Spider was effectively the replacement for the then 30-year-old 105-series Giulia Spider. The GTV was available until the launch of the Brera in 2005, while the Spider lasted another year until the launch of its Brera-based successor in 2006.

The Alfa Romeo GTV was described as "one of the best sports cars of its time" by motoring journalist Jeremy Clarkson in 1998 and was listed at number 29 in Top 100 Cars in 2001.

== Design ==
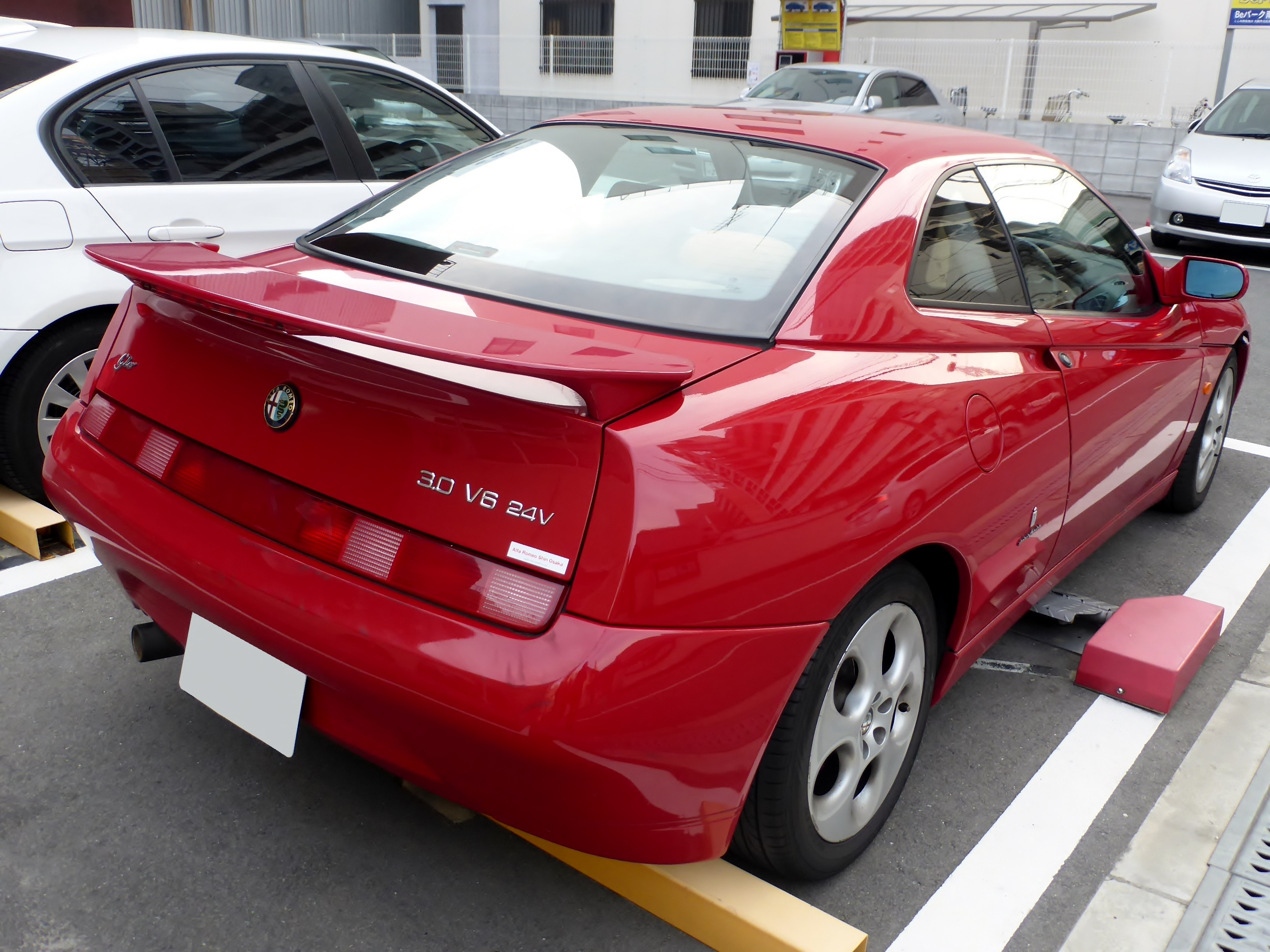
GTV V6 (Phase 2)

The GTV and Spider were designed by Enrico Fumia at Pininfarina. The GTV was planned to re-establish Alfa Romeo's sports coupe tradition during the 1990s. The design dates back to initial renderings in September 1987; the first 1:1 scale clay models were completed in July 1988. Fiat's then CEO, Vittorio Ghidella, rejected Pininfarina's interior design proposal created by Giuseppe Randazzo, after which the Centro Stile Alfa Romeo under Walter de Silva was assigned the responsibility for the completion of the exterior design details and a completely new design of the interior. The Drag coefficient of the final design was 0.33 for the GTV and 0.38 for the Spider. The Chief Engineer for the project was Bruno Carela. The Spider and GTV are based on the then current Fiat Group compact car platform, called "Tipo Due" (or Type 2) – in this case a heavily modified version with an all new multilink rear suspension. The front suspension and drivetrain are shared with the 1992 Alfa 155 saloon.

The Alfa Romeo grille with dual round headlights was a motif later used on the Proteo concept car. The car has a wedge-shaped design with a low nose. The back of the car is "cut-off" with a "Kamm tail" resulting in improved aerodynamics. The Spider shares these traits with the GTV except that the rear is rounded in order to fit the retractable roof. The Spider features a folding soft-top with a five-hoop frame, which folds under a flush fitting cover behind the seats. An electric folding mechanism was also an option.

Other design details included a rear lamp/fog lamp/indicator strip across the rear of the body and instruments in the centre console being angled towards the driver. At the car's launch, many journalists remarked that Alfa had improved its overall build quality considerably as compared to past models and that it came very close to equaling its German rivals.

== Awards ==
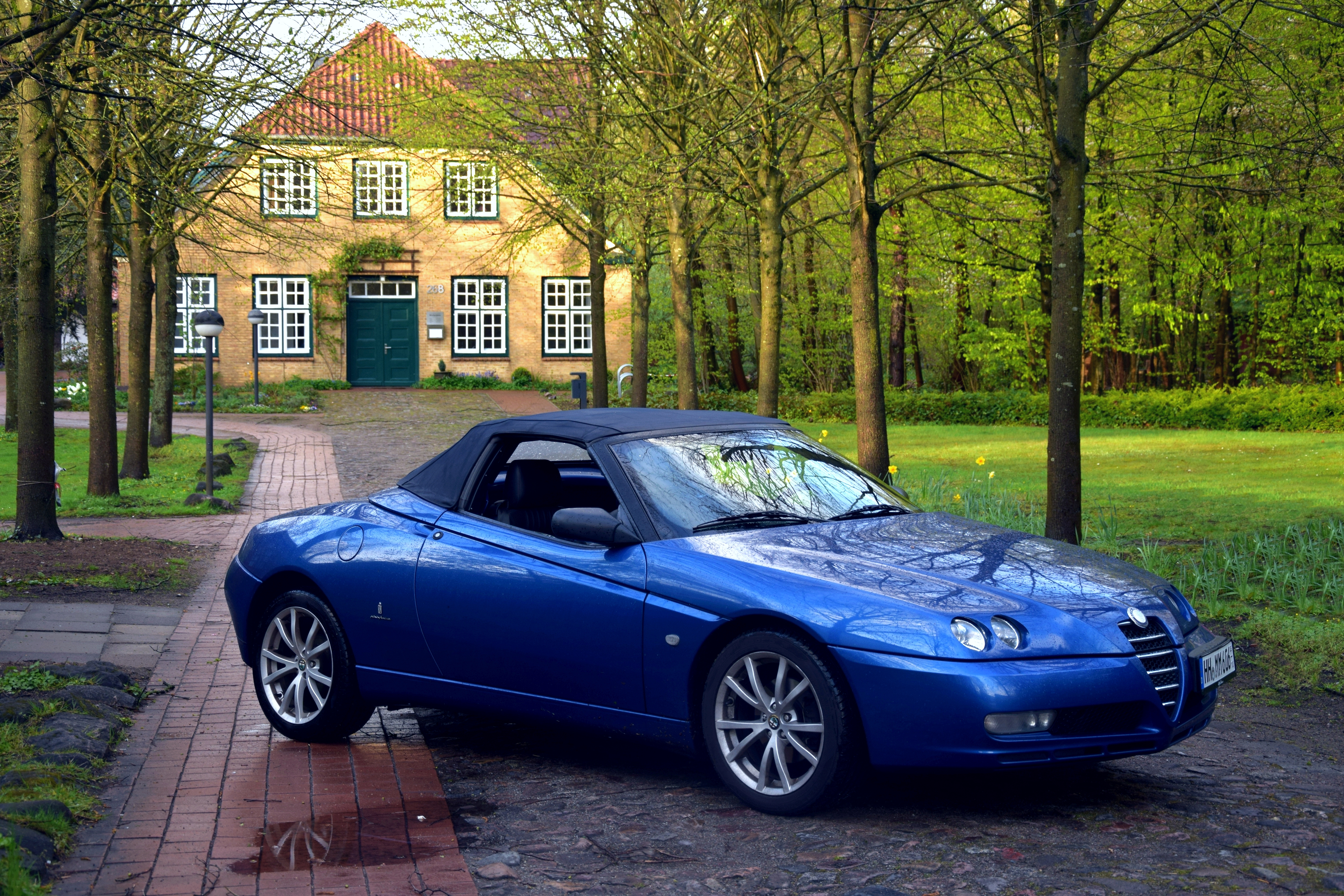
Spider Edizione 2004 in Blu Reims Met.

- 1995: Autocar Magazine: "1995 Car of the Year".
- 1995: Car Magazine: "Best Designed Car".
- 1995: Car Magazine: Best Design Detail in production.
- 1995: "The World's most Beautiful Automobile" award.
- 1995: Bild: "Goldenes Lenkrad".
- 1995: Automobilia: "Auto più bella del mondo".
- 1995: Autocar Magazine: "Best Sport Car".
- 1995: Auto Zeitung: "Best car to drive".
- 1995: "Engineer of the Year" for chief Alfa Romeo engineer, Bruno Cena.
- 1995: Trofeu do Automovel Categoria "Deportivo di Ano" (Sports Car of the Year)

== History ==
GTV/Spider production figures
Engine	Body	Totals
3.0 12V	Spider	3,864
3.0 12V	GTV	5
2.0 TS	Spider	28,013
2.0 TS	GTV	24,579
2.0 V6 TB	Spider	170
2.0 V6 TB	GTV	7,284
3.0 24V	Spider	1,322
3.0 24V	GTV	6,502
1.8 TS	Spider	2,851
1.8 TS	GTV	2,873
3.2 24V	Spider	551
3.2 24V	GTV	512
2.0 JTS	Spider	2,120
2.0 JTS	GTV	1,182

Pininfarina production figures
Body	2000	2001	2002	2003	2004	Totals
GTV	779	2,853	1,020	1,521	589	6,762
Spider	710	3,207	1,896	2,094	1,119	9,026
Totals	1,489	6,060	2,916	3,615	1,708	15,788

Engine choices included the 2.0-litre Twin Spark 4-cylinder engine or the 2.0-litre turbocharged V6 engine for the GTV, with the engine choices for the Spider being the 2.0-litre Twin Spark engine or a naturally aspirated 3.0-litre 12V V6 engine.

Production began in late 1993 with four cars, all being 3.0 V6 Spider models, assembled at the Alfa Romeo Arese Plant in Milan. In early 1994, the first GTV was produced, with the 2.0-litre Twin Spark engine. The production models debuted at the 1994 Paris Motor Show. The GTV and Spider were officially launched at the Geneva Motor Show in March 1995 and sales began in the same year. The GTV V6 Turbo has two air intakes on the lower lip, one for the oil cooler and the other for the intercooler. Early models of the V6 Spider lacked any additional air intakes as the oil cooler was mounted in front of the radiator. The car was produced in three distinct phases. The Phase 1 cars have a black plastic grille located in the nose of the bonnet, without the chrome details and black-painted sills all round.

=== 1997 changes ===
For the 1997 model year GTV, a new engine, a 24-valve 3.0-litre V6, was available. GTV models equipped with this new engine also had a new 16-inch 5 hole 'teledial' wheel design to provide extra clearance for the larger, 305 mm (12.0 in) brakes and red four-piston calipers from Brembo. Further exterior changes included new rear badging (V6 24) denoting the fitment of the new engine, and V6 Turbo-sourced front bumper lip with just one intake on the right side to allow for air flow to the front mounted oil cooler. Some models had a different front bumper mesh to bring the wind noise down to 74 dBA.

On the interior, pleated leather seats from MOMO were offered in White, Red or Tan colours. These seats came with their respective matching coloured carpets, pleated leather door card inserts as well as optional colour coded stitching for the hand brake, gear lever and for an all new three-spoke steering wheel. The Right-hand drive cars for 1997, however, retained the original, four-spoke steering wheel.

=== 1998 facelift ===
In May 1998, the GTV and Spider underwent a facelift (called Phase 2). The main changes included an updated interior with a new center console, a different control layout and switch arrangement along with a different instrument cluster and painted letters on the skirt seals. The main changes on the exterior included a chrome frame around the grille fitted in the bonnet and color-coded side skirts and bumpers. A new engine was also introduced, the 144 PS (106 kW; 142 hp) 1.8-litre Twin Spark while the existing engines received some updates: the 2.0 Twin Spark was updated with a modular intake manifold with different length intakes and a different plastic cover. The power output of the 2.0-litre TS was raised to 155 PS (114 kW; 153 hp). Engines with the updated engine management units and have a nomenclature of CF2. The dashboard was available in two new colours styles in addition to the standard black: Red Style and Blue Style, and with it new colour-coded upholstery and carpets. The 3.0 24V model got a 6-speed manual gearbox as an optional extra. While the 2.0 V6 TB engine also became available for the Spider. From this year on, every V6-engined car had additional air intakes on the lower lip.

==== 2000 engine revamp ====
In August 2000, the engines were revamped to comply with the new Euro3 emission standards. All engines were slightly detuned and now had a new identification code "CF3". The 3.0-litre V6 12V engine was discontinued for the Spider and was replaced with the 24V version from the GTV, now equipped only with a 6-speed manual gearbox. The 2.0 V6 Turbo and 1.8 T.Spark engines were also discontinued, and, for the 2001 mode year, the engine range comprised only the 2.0 T.Spark and 3.0 V6 24V, until the "Phase 3" engine range was introduced. The GTV/Spider were the last Alfa Romeo automobiles made at the Arese plant, which was decommissioned with production moving to Pininfarina, at its Giorgio Canavese plant in Turin, in October 2000.

=== 2003 facelift ===
In 2003, a new and last refresh arrived (called Phase 3) with the exterior design changes performed by Pininfarina without the involvement of Enrico Fumia. The main design changes are focused on the front of the car with a new 147-style grille along with a redesigned front bumper with an offset license plate holder. Changes made to the interior of the car were minimal with a different center console, upholstery pattern and colours available. The instrument illumination colour was changed from green to red. An ASR traction control was introduced, which was not available for the 2.0 TS Base model. A series of new engines were also introduced: a 165 PS (121 kW; 163 hp) 2.0-litre JTS engine with direct petrol injection and a 240 PS (177 kW; 237 hp) 3.2-litre 24V V6 allowing for a top speed of 255 km/h (158 mph).

By the end of 2004, production of the GTV and Spider came to an end, although some cars were still available for purchase until 2006. Overall, the TS model was the best-selling model of the range.

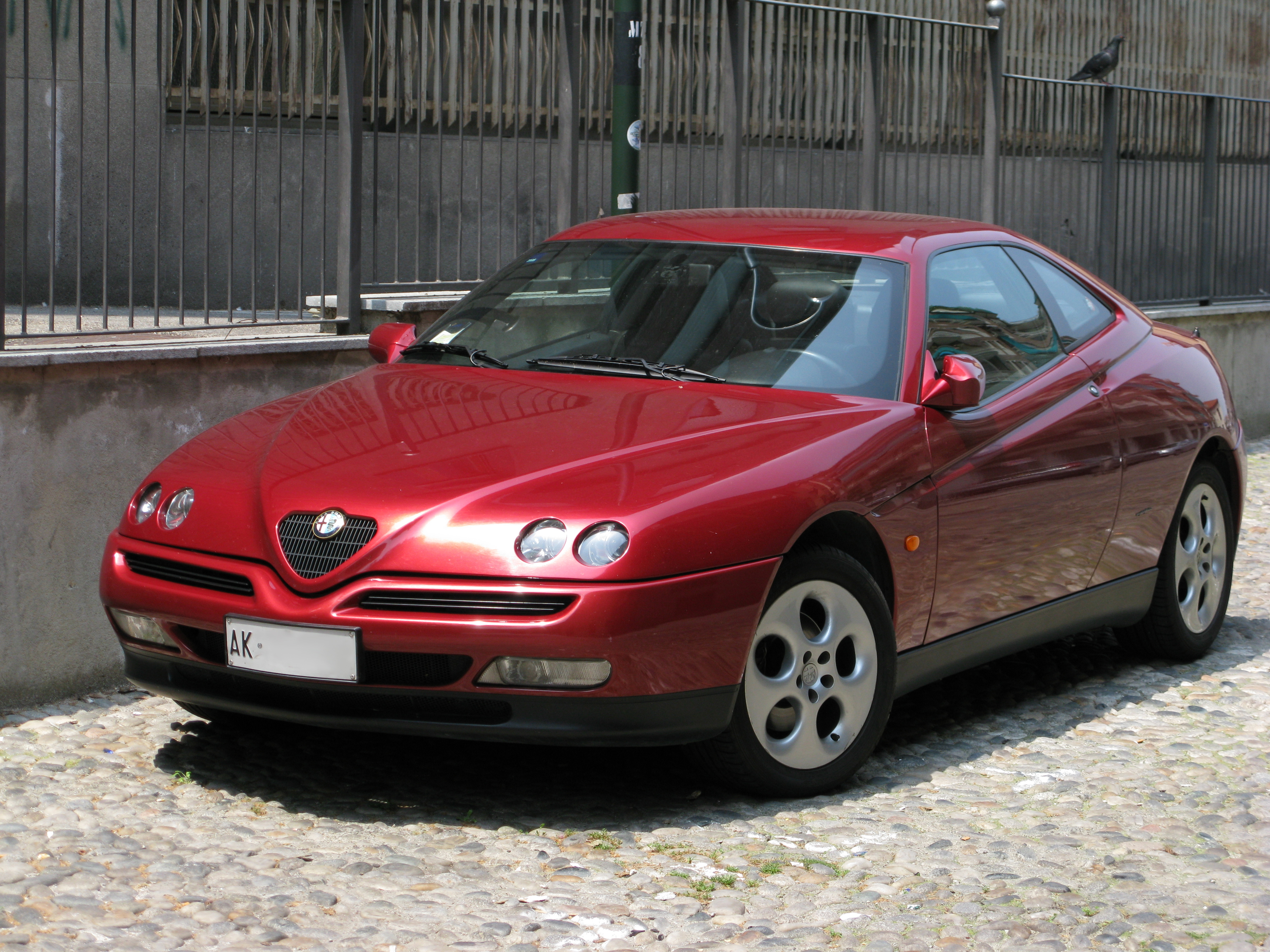
1996 GTV

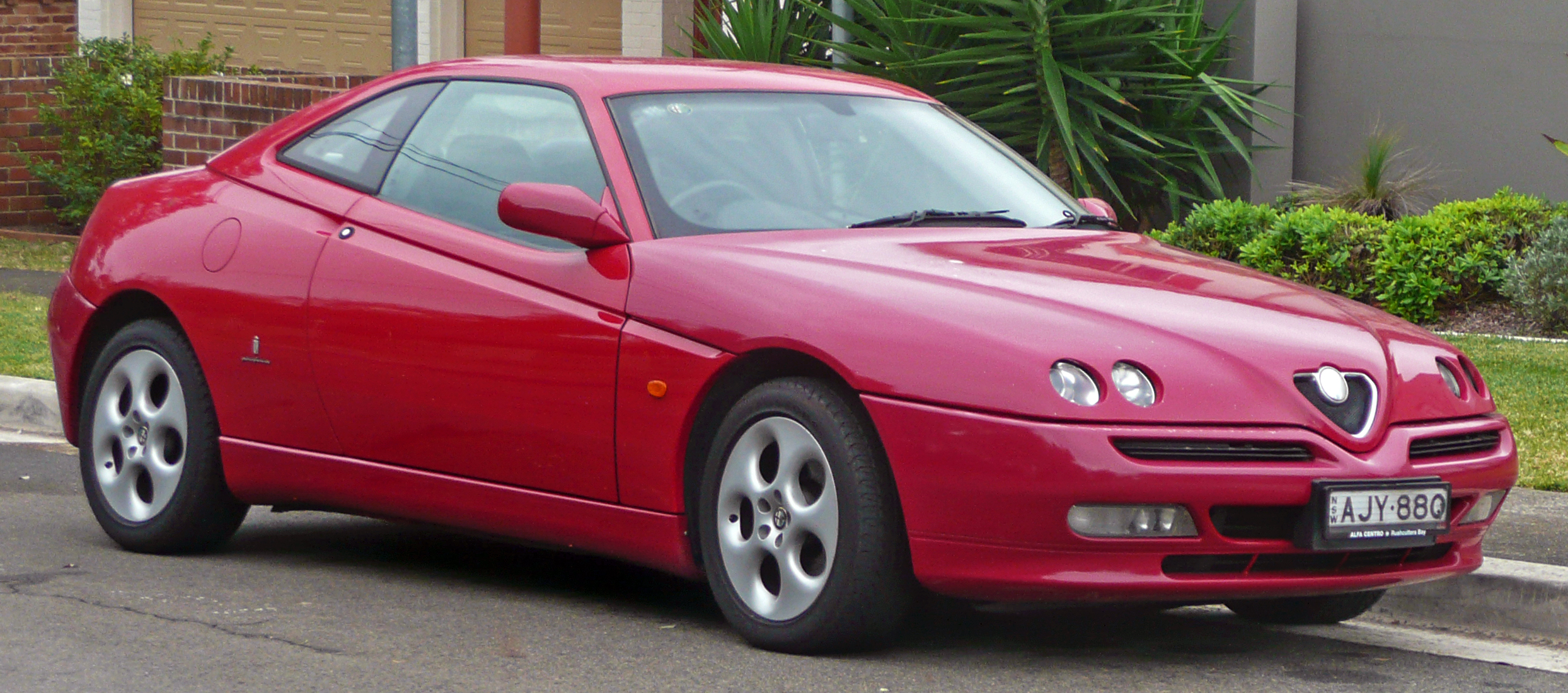
2001 GTV (Phase 2)

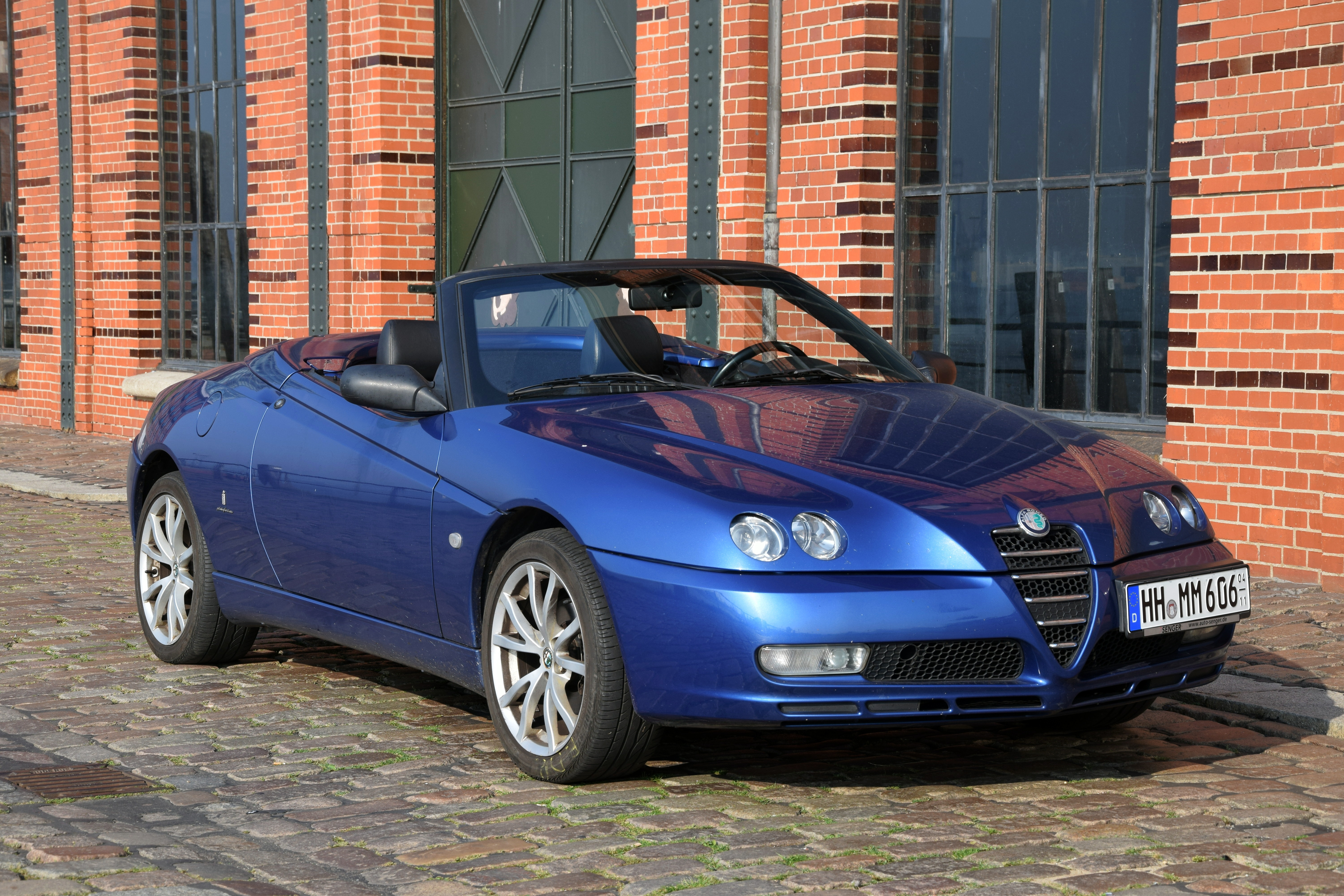
Spider with the Phase 3 facelift

== Characteristics ==
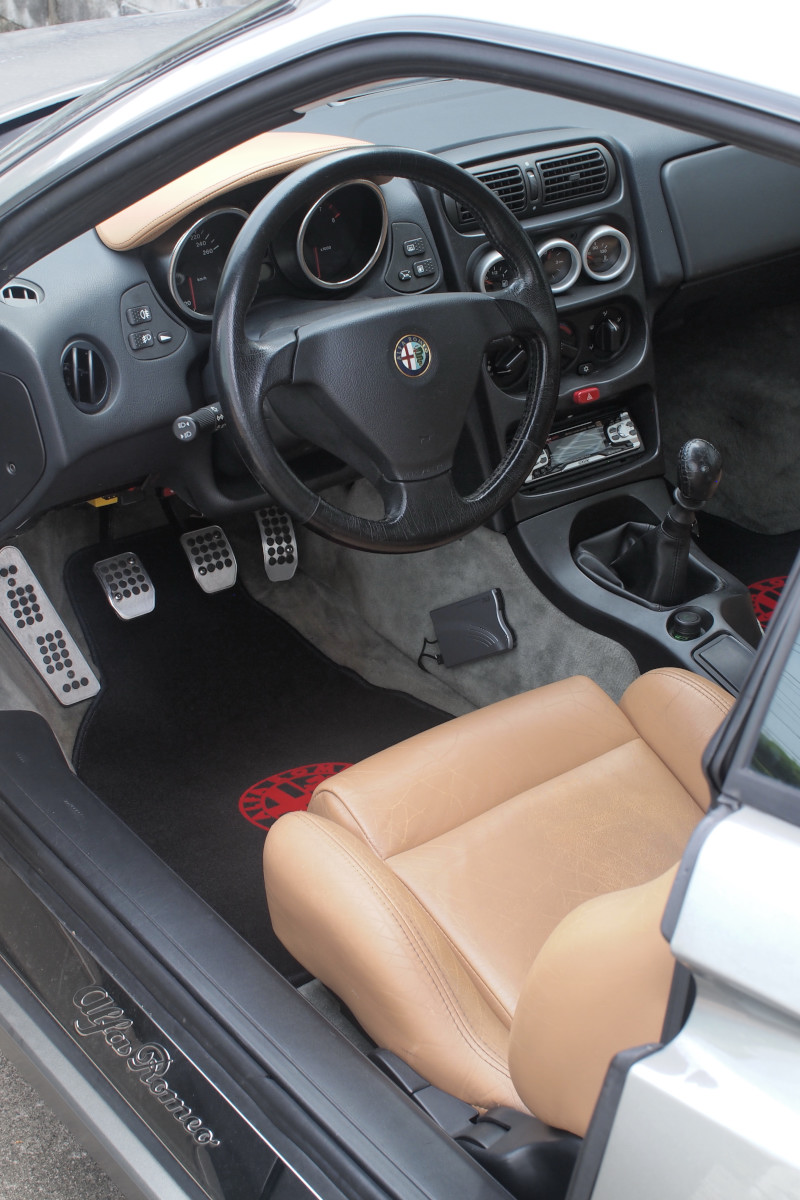
Phase 1 interior

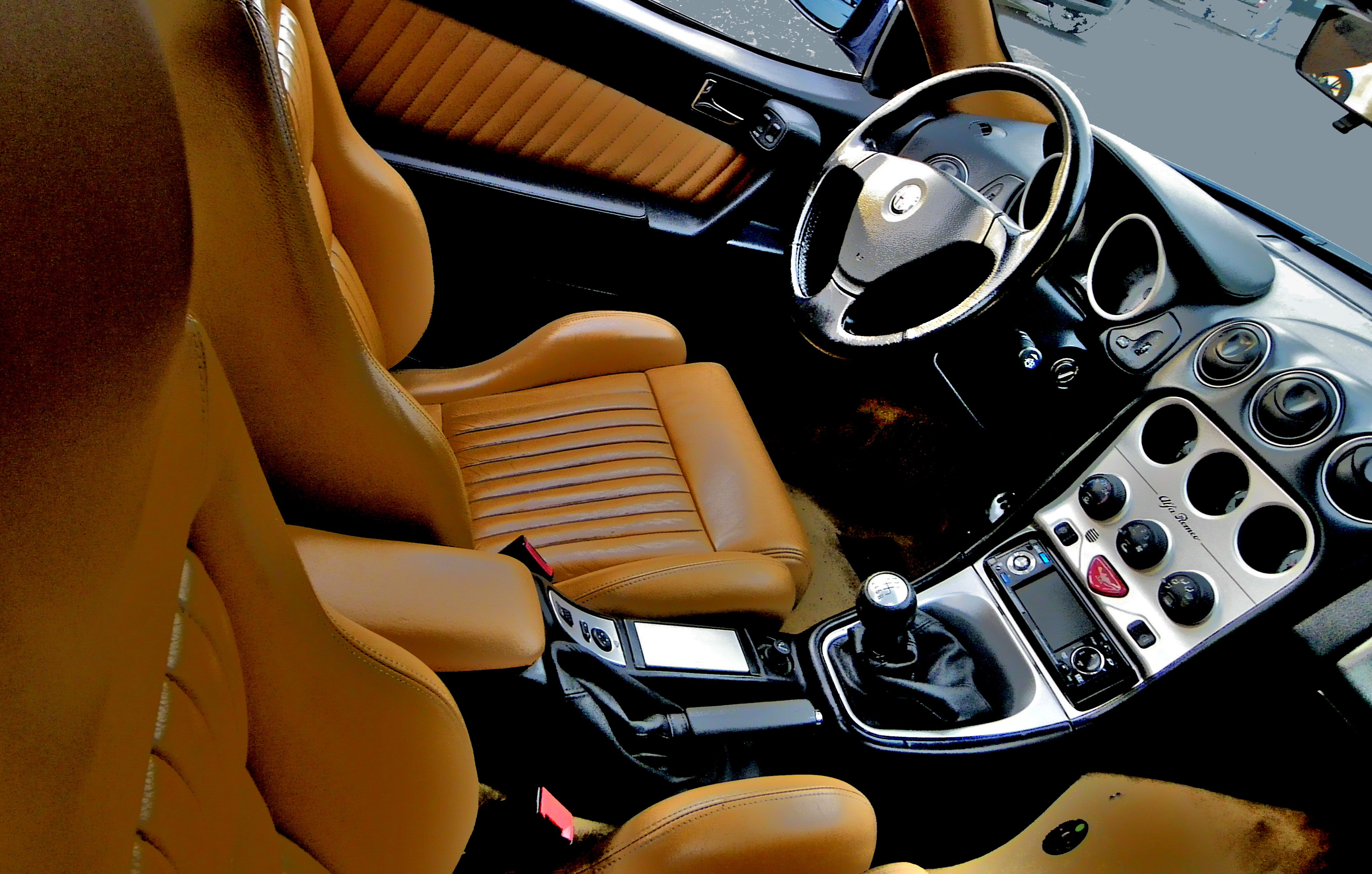
Phase 2 interior

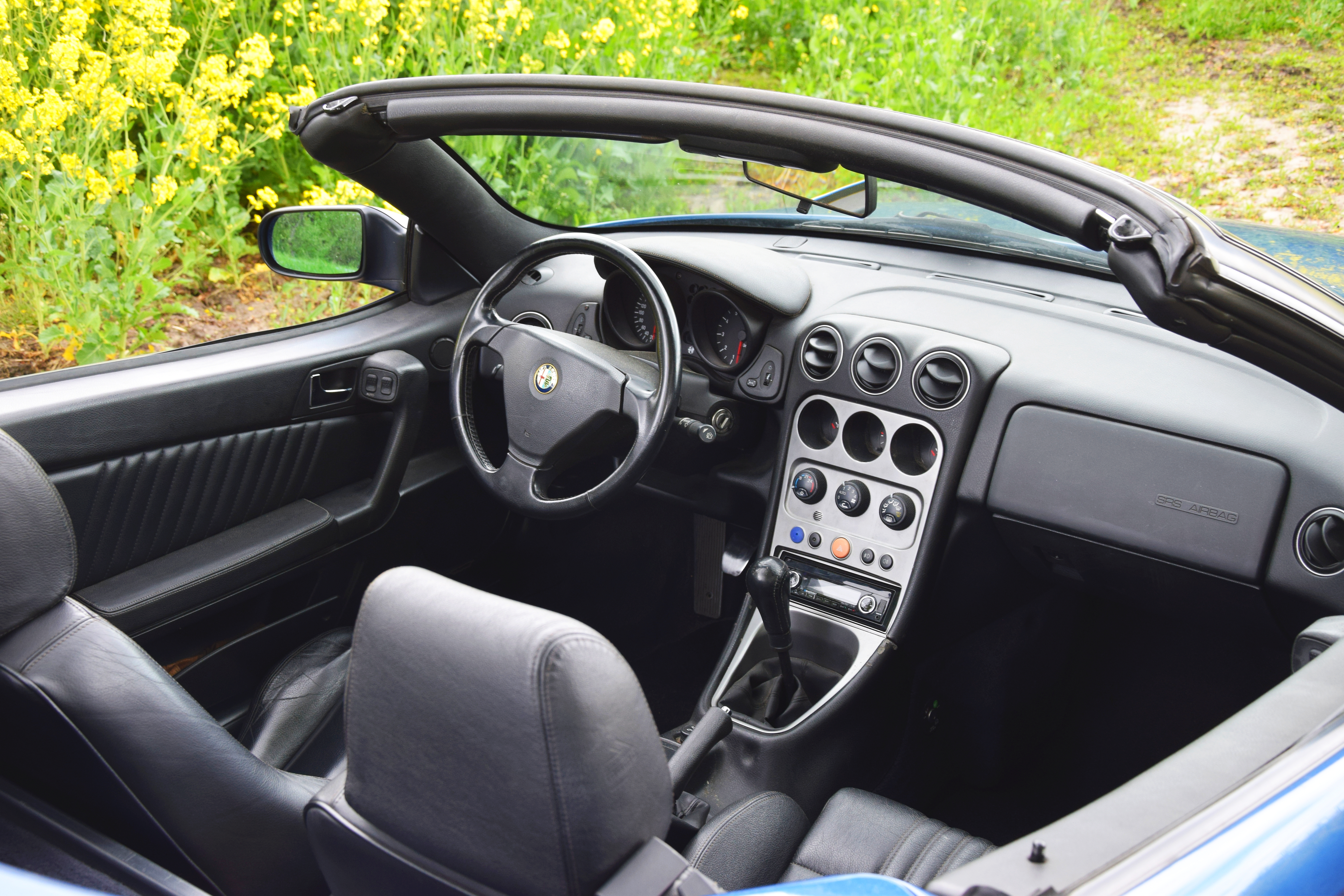
Phase 3 interior

=== Engines ===
The engine range included of the GTV and Spider included the following range of the Inline-4 engine:

- 1.8-litre 16-valve (144 PS (106 kW; 142 hp))
- 2.0-litre 16-valve Twin Spark (150 PS (110 kW; 148 hp))

The V6 engine range included:

- 2.0-litre 12-valve turbocharged (200 PS (147 kW; 197 hp))
- 3.0-litre 12-valve (192 PS (141 kW; 189 hp))
- 3.0-litre 24-valve (220 PS (162 kW; 217 hp))
- 3.2-litre 24-valve (240 PS (177 kW; 237 hp)).

The turbocharged 2.0-litre V6, called V6 TB, was developed due to Italy's fiscal policy imposing a higher sales tax on cars powered by engines with a capacity of more than 2.0-litres. It is essentially a sleeved-down version of the 3.0-litre V6 engine. The turbocharger helped maintain a higher power-output for the smaller displacement engine while avoiding the higher tax. Both variants of the 12-valve V6 engines have a redline of about 6,500 rpm, while 16 and 24-valve engines have a redline of 7,000 rpm.

The 2.0-litre 16-valve Twin Spark engine of the 2.0 TS model was based on the Fiat SuperFIRE-family block, featuring an Alfa Romeo-developed cylinder head with two spark plugs per cylinder. Variable inlet cam timing, which allowed for 25 degrees of variation, was designed to improve torque and provide a more linear power delivery. In addition, the engine has two belt driven balance camshafts rotating at twice the engine's speed in order to eliminate vibrations from the engine. The base 1.8-litre engine did not feature the balance shafts. CF2 and CF3 engines have plastic valve cover and variable-length intake manifold.

The 3.2 V6 24V GTV model was the fastest road going Alfa Romeo at the time, capable of accelerating from 0–100 km/h in just over six seconds and attaining a top speed of 255 km/h (158 mph).

The last restyle of the GTV in 2003 saw the introduction of new 4-cylinder engines, in the form of the 2.0-litre JTS, with a power output of 165 PS (121 kW; 163 hp) and featuring direct fuel injection, similar to systems used on diesel engines. The JTS engine uses only one spark plug per cylinder but retained variable-length inlet manifold and variable valve timing on the intake camshaft.

=== Specifications ===
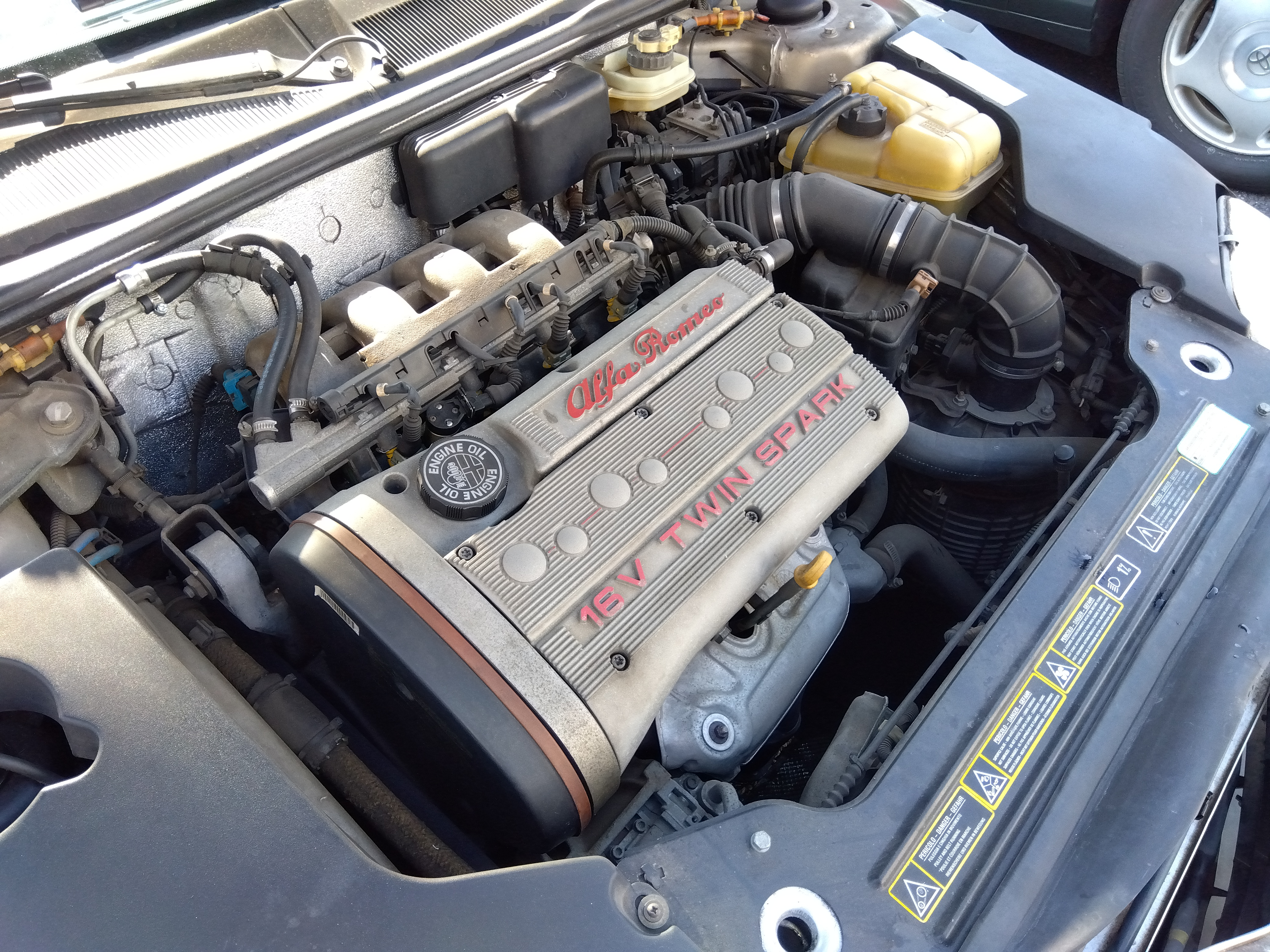
2.0TS 16V (AR 16201)

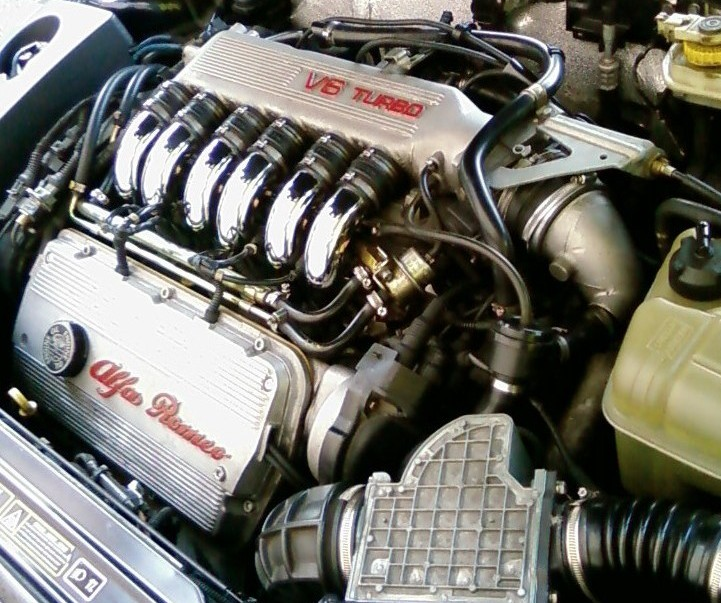
2.0L V6 12V Turbo

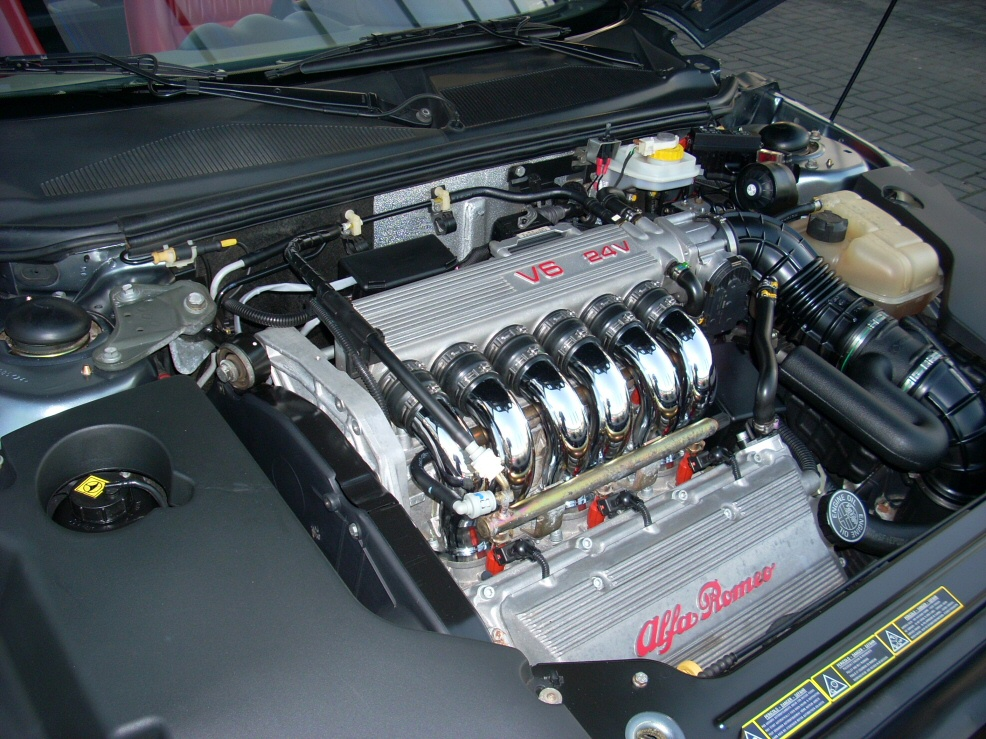
3.0L V6 24V engine

Model	Engine	Displacement	Max. power output	Peak torque	0–100 km/h,s 0-62 mph,s	Top speed	CO_{2} emissions	Years	Note	Engine code
1.8 TS	I4	1,747 cc (106.6 cu in)	144 PS (106 kW; 142 hp) at 6,500 rpm	169 N⋅m (125 lb⋅ft) at 3,500 rpm	9.2	210 km/h (130 mph)	210 g/km	05/1998–08/2000	Euro2	AR 32201
2.0 TS	I4	1,970 cc (120 cu in)	150 PS (110 kW; 148 hp) at 6,200 rpm	186 N⋅m (137 lb⋅ft) at 4,000 rpm	8.4	215 km/h (134 mph)	225 g/km	1995–05/1998	Euro1	AR 16201
2.0 TS	I4	1,970 cc (120 cu in)	155 PS (114 kW; 153 hp) at 6,400 rpm	187 N⋅m (138 lb⋅ft) at 3,500 rpm	8.4	216 km/h (134 mph)	220 g/km	05/1998–08/2000	Euro2	AR 32301
2.0 TS	I4	1,970 cc (120 cu in)	150 PS (110 kW; 148 hp) at 6,300 rpm	181 N⋅m (133 lb⋅ft) at 3,800 rpm	8.5	215 km/h (134 mph)	220 g/km	08/2000–2006	Euro3	AR 32310
2.0 JTS	I4	1,970 cc (120 cu in)	165 PS (121 kW; 163 hp) at 6,400 rpm	206 N⋅m (152 lb⋅ft) at 3,250 rpm	8.4	220 km/h (137 mph)	220 g/km	04/2003–2006	Euro 4	937A1000
2.0 V6 TB	V6	1,996 cc (121.8 cu in)	200 PS (147 kW; 197 hp) at 6,000 rpm	271 N⋅m (200 lb⋅ft) at 2,400 rpm (280 N⋅m (207 lb⋅ft) with overboost)	7.4	235 km/h (146 mph)	260 g/km	1995–08/2000	Euro1/E2	AR 16202
3.0 V6 12V	V6	2,959 cc (180.6 cu in)	192 PS (141 kW; 189 hp) at 5,600 rpm	260 N⋅m (192 lb⋅ft) at 4,400 rpm	7.3	225 km/h (140 mph)	265 g/km	1995–08/2000	Spider Euro1/E2	AR 16101
3.0 V6 24V	V6	2,959 cc (180.6 cu in)	220 PS (162 kW; 217 hp) at 6,300 rpm	270 N⋅m (199 lb⋅ft) at 5,000 rpm	6.7	240 km/h (149 mph)	278 g/km	1997–08/2000	GTV Euro1/E2	AR 16102
3.0 V6 24V	V6	2,959 cc (180.6 cu in)	218 PS (160 kW; 215 hp) at 6,300 rpm	265 N⋅m (195 lb⋅ft) at 5,000 rpm	6.8	238 km/h (148 mph)	278 g/km	08/2000–04/2003	Euro3	AR 16105
3.2 V6 24V	V6	3,179 cc (194.0 cu in)	240 PS (177 kW; 237 hp) at 6,200 rpm	289 N⋅m (213 lb⋅ft) at 4,800 rpm	6.3	255 km/h (158 mph)**	315 g/km	04/2003–2006	Euro3	936A6000

*performance values for GTV, unless otherwise stated
**top speed with aerokit +5 km/h (3 mph) for all, +10 km/h (6 mph) for 3.0 V6 24V

=== Fuel economy ===
Engine	Combined	Urban	Extra-urban
1.8 TS	8.9 L/100 km (32 mpg_{‑imp}; 26 mpg_{‑US})	12.9 L/100 km (21.9 mpg_{‑imp}; 18.2 mpg_{‑US})	6.5 L/100 km (43 mpg_{‑imp}; 36 mpg_{‑US})
2.0 TS	9.2 L/100 km (31 mpg_{‑imp}; 26 mpg_{‑US})	13.3 L/100 km (21.2 mpg_{‑imp}; 17.7 mpg_{‑US})	6.8 L/100 km (42 mpg_{‑imp}; 35 mpg_{‑US})
2.0 JTS	9.2 L/100 km (31 mpg_{‑imp}; 26 mpg_{‑US})	13.3 L/100 km (21.2 mpg_{‑imp}; 17.7 mpg_{‑US})	6.8 L/100 km (42 mpg_{‑imp}; 35 mpg_{‑US})
2.0 V6 TB	10.8 L/100 km (26 mpg_{‑imp}; 22 mpg_{‑US})	16.6 L/100 km (17.0 mpg_{‑imp}; 14.2 mpg_{‑US})	7.5 L/100 km (38 mpg_{‑imp}; 31 mpg_{‑US})
3.0 V6 12V	11.0 L/100 km (26 mpg_{‑imp}; 21.4 mpg_{‑US})	16.8 L/100 km (16.8 mpg_{‑imp}; 14.0 mpg_{‑US})	7.6 L/100 km (37 mpg_{‑imp}; 31 mpg_{‑US})
3.0 V6 24V	11.7 L/100 km (24 mpg_{‑imp}; 20.1 mpg_{‑US})	16.8 L/100 km (16.8 mpg_{‑imp}; 14.0 mpg_{‑US})	8.7 L/100 km (32 mpg_{‑imp}; 27 mpg_{‑US})
3.2 V6 24V	13.2 L/100 km (21.4 mpg_{‑imp}; 17.8 mpg_{‑US})	19.9 L/100 km (14.2 mpg_{‑imp}; 11.8 mpg_{‑US})	9.3 L/100 km (30 mpg_{‑imp}; 25 mpg_{‑US})

*factory data

=== Equipment ===
The GTV/Spider was equipped as standard with power steering, driver and passenger airbags, automatic air conditioning, front seatbelt pretensioners, Bosch ABS (with EBD from 1998), electric heated door mirrors, electric frameless windows with one-touch operation for the driver's side, height adjustable headlamps, front and rear foglights, third brake light, fire prevention system, a reach and rake adjustable leather clad steering wheel, a stitched leather gear knob, an automatic electric aerial, a stereo radio/cassette player with six speakers, central locking with Alfa-CODE immobiliser and an internal electric release for the bootlid and filler flap. The additional options consisted of an alarm system, passenger-side airbag installation/removal, electric heated seats (GTV only), metallic paint, iridescent paint (exclusive to the Lusso trim), leather MOMO seats (exclusive to the Lusso trim) and an electric sunroof (GTV only). For the Spider models, some cars could be equipped with an electric hood folding mechanism.

The Lusso was a separate trim rather than an option pack and the standard car was renamed the "Turismo" from "Medio" in the UK. Medio and Lusso trims on phase 1 and 2 cars were available with almost any engine, except for Medio-only 1.8 L TS. Phase 3 cars were divided into Medio-only 2.0 L JTS and Lusso-only 3.2 L V6, also available was "Base" M.Y. 2003 2.0 L TS.

Blue Style and Red Style interiors were available with Lusso trim on Phase 2 and on all Phase 3 cars. Blue Style consisted of blue dashboard and white or blue leather MOMO seats, while Red Style had red dashboard with red or black leather MOMO seats. Rest of the equipment and options remain unchanged. With standard black dashboard there were 4 leather MOMO seat colours to choose from (excluding limited editions): black, red and tan. Also light-grey but only for Spider. On Phase 1 cars the leather MOMO seats were available in 3 colours: red, tan and white.

=== Technical ===
All CF3 engines have three catalytic converters installed, with two of them present at the exhaust manifold as compared to the CF1 and CF2 engines which had only one catalytic converter.

The fuel tank has a capacity of 70 litres (18 US gal; 15 imp gal). The battery is located in the boot of the GTV or in the storage compartment behind the seats of the Spider. The optional CD auto changer is located in the boot, and the fuel tank is ahead of the rear axle line, behind the rear seats for increased safety. The power assisted steering has a very high ratio, giving 2.2 turns lock-to-lock. The bonnet and bootlid are supported on nitrogen filled struts. A space saver spare wheel was supplied, and there was a no-cost option of an aerosol can of a tyre repair sealant. This was a factory standard from 1998 as it increased the usable size of the very small boot to 155 litres (5.5 cu ft).

To save weight the bonnet was made from a composite material called KMC (composed of polyester and fiberglass, and using epoxi adhesives as well), while the front wings were made from PUR plastic. At the time, the bonnet was the largest single composite moulding on a production car. When the bonnet is opened, two rectangular Hella headlamps are revealed with separate bulbs for dip and main beam, behind the four round holes in the bonnet. The bodyshell was galvanised with full plastic wheelarch liners and is therefore rustproof. Weight distribution for the four cylinder equipped models is 61% front and 39% rear and for the V6 equipped models is 63% front and 37% rear

As expected, the GTV has a much more rigid chassis (64% stiffer) than the Spider, although considerable work was done on the Spider to reduce the traditional convertible problem of scuttle shake. The Spider also features reinforced A-pillars.

The standard wheels have a diameter of 15 inch and are made from perforated steel, 16 inch teardrop alloy wheels with 205/50 tyres were part of the Lusso trim. From Phase 2 and 3 onwards, 16 inch teardrop alloy wheels became standard with a factory option of 17 inch alloy wheels and 225/45 tyres. The Spider received the 17 inch wheels option from the Phase 3 facelift (not including earlier limited editions).

A common criticism of the car is that it is hard to park due to its large turning circle (11.2 m on most cars) along with the long doors which require considerable space to open in a car park. The low seating position was also criticised, which means that the end of the bonnet and its corners are outside the driver's line of sight.

Kerb weight*
	Phase 1				Phase 2					Phase 3		
Body	2.0 TS	2.0 V6 TB	3.0 V6 12V	3.0 V6 24V	1.8 TS	2.0 TS	2.0 V6 TB	3.0 V6 12V	3.0 V6 24V	2.0 TS	2.0 JTS	3.2 V6 24V
GTV	1,370 kg (3,020 lb)	1,430 kg (3,153 lb)	n/a	1,415 kg (3,120 lb)	1,350 kg (2,976 lb)	1,370 kg (3,020 lb)	1,430 kg (3,153 lb)	n/a	1,415 kg (3,120 lb)	1,370 kg (3,020 lb)	1,370 kg (3,020 lb)	1,445 kg (3,186 lb)
Spider	1,370 kg (3,020 lb)	n/a	1,420 kg (3,131 lb)	n/a	1,350 kg (2,976 lb)	1,370 kg (3,020 lb)	1,430 kg (3,153 lb)	1,420 kg (3,131 lb)	1,415 kg (3,120 lb)	1,405 kg (3,097 lb)	1,405 kg (3,097 lb)	1,470 kg (3,241 lb)

*from: sales brochures, owners manuals and repair manuals

=== Suspension ===
The front suspension utilises a fairly conventional set-up that comprises MacPherson struts, offset coil springs, lower wishbones and an anti-roll bar.

The independent, multiple arm rear suspension has quadrilateral geometry with an upper triangle, double lower arms, coil springs and anti-roll bar secured to a light alloy subframe which is, in turn, mounted onto the car's body. The design of this geometry, and the fine tuning of the bushes, is such that during initial stages of a turn, the centrifugal forces create a small 'rear wheel steer' effect in the opposite direction to the way the front wheels are being pointed. Then, as the centrifugal forces build up through the corner, the rear wheels start steering in the same direction as the front wheels. The result is a more positive 'attack' into the first stages of cornering and increased stability in the later stages. This multilink rear suspension was designed by Gianclaudio Travaglio.

=== Brakes ===
Cars have disc brakes all round, while most versions had 284 mm (11.2 in) Lucas or ATE system ventilated-discs at the front, some Spiders (1.8 TS and 2.0 TS) had 257 mm (10.1 in) Altecna-system. 3.0 V6 24V GTV and Spider had 305 mm (12.0 in) Brembo-system ventilated-discs with 4-pot calipers painted red with white 'Alfa Romeo" lettering. 3.2 V6 cars had the same 305 mm discs, even though GTA cars were later upgraded to 330 mm. All cars had 240 mm (9.4 in) Lucas-system solid-discs at the back.

=== Limited editions ===
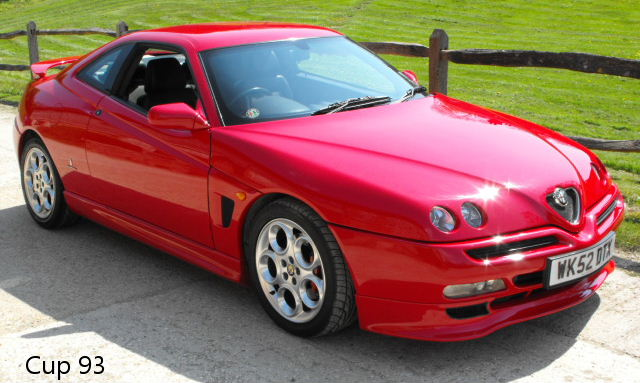
Alfa Romeo GTV 3.0 V6 24v Cup

There were numerous limited edition GTV and Spider available. All can be categorized into 4 groups: Edizione Sportiva GTV 2001, Special Series 2001, Limited Editions 2002 and Special Series 2004. Almost all have the titanium-like finished center console without the Alfa Romeo script. All Special Series (except for some German-market Edizione Classica) cars have a silver numbered plaque on the side of the center console. All of the cars except for the first have unique version codes. All Spiders have electrically operated hood. All cars are in Lusso-trim equipment. Total numbers for each limited edition vary from as little as 8 or 10 to 419 or 700. Apart from producer sanctioned editions there were also few importer exclusive editions made for particular markets like Australia or Japan.

==== GTV Cup 2001 ====
The GTV Cup is a limited edition inspired by the mono-make Alfa GTV Cup race series in Italy. Only 419 cars were built in total, with 264 LHD versions and 155 RHD versions. Two different engines were used in the production: 180 cars were built with the 3.0 V6 24V (all 155 RHD versions were 3.0 models) and 239 cars with 2.0 Twin Sparks. The 3.0 V6 cars were only painted in Alfa Romeo Red while 2.0 TS cars were almost exclusively painted in Grigio Chiaro (there are just a few examples in red). Limited edition plaques, that were made of silver, differed for the RHD and LHD versions, having red and black texts accordingly and each run was separately numbered (i.e. there is both a LHD 001 and a RHD 001). Differences between the standard GTV and the Cup version are factory fitted rear spoiler, front spoiler, side skirts, wheel arch side vents and titanium-like finish 17-inch 'telephone dial' alloys;, although mechanically they are the same as the regular specifications. The Cup exclusive interior offers half-leather upholstery and the plastic centre console fascias were finished in a darker shade of grey. 2.0 TS GTV Cups have 4-pot Brembo callipers as have 3.0 V6 GTVs.

==== Edizione Sportiva GTV 2001 ====
German-market GTV available as a limited edition "Edizione Sportiva". Cars were only available with 2.0 TS or 3.0 V6 24V CF3 engines and produced in 2001. GTV Edizione Sportiva differed from the standard car by having black leather upholstery with red stitching, red carpets, front wings from Zender, Blaupunkt radio/navi with 10-CD changer in the boot, electric seats, 17-inch 'teledial' alloys and was available only in Nero Met. Edizione Sportiva was limited to 500 cars, but around 200 were made. This is the only limited edition to have the Alfa Romeo script on the center console and the only edition to lack the unique version code.

==== GTV Serie Speciale 'Elegant' 2001 ====
GTV 'Elegant' was available in Blu Vela Met. or Nero Met. and had brown leather upholstery, darker than the standard tanned leather; and black carpets. Also there were additional leather strips underneath the door armrest, as have most limited editions. It also has a "Serie Limitata" numbered plaque on the titanium-like finished center console. Available with CF3 engines: 2.0 TS and 3.0 V6 24V.

==== Edizione Classica Spider 2001 ====
Spider only, 2001 limited edition with either a 2.0 TS or 3.0 V6 24V engine. Sold only in Nero Met. with 17-inch high-gloss 'teledial' alloys and electric hood. Center console with limited edition numbered plaque and without the "Alfa Romeo" script. The interior is light grey upholstery combined with black carpets, although German-market cars appear as regular cars with light grey carpets and regular center console.

==== Spider Serie Speciale 'Elegant' 2001 ====
Spider, available in Giallo Ginestra or Grigio Chiaro Met. with Blue Style dashboard and matching blue leather Momo seats and carpets. Blue electric hood, high-gloss finished 'teledial' alloys and limited edition numbered plaque on the center console. Only 600 cars offered with 2.0 TS or 3.0 V6 24V but around 300 were made.

==== Motus GTV 2002 ====
GTV only, Nero Met. exterior with two-part Zender kit, perforated black upholstery interior with red leather Momo seats, titanium-like finished center console without limited edition plaque, 17-inch alloys. Other combination features Rosso Miro Pearl. exterior and perforated black leather interior. Available with 2.0 TS and Nero Met. also with 3.0 V6 24V.

==== Lux GTV 2002 ====
Two different GTV editions. Grigio Chiaro Met. exterior and 'tango' leather interior with black carpets. Azzurro Nuvola Pearl. exterior and Black Leather interior. 2.0 TS only.

==== Edizione Sportiva Spider 2002 ====
Spider Edizione Sportiva was equipped with side skirts and front wings from Zender, available only in Grigio Chiaro Met. with perforated black leather upholstery with red stitching. All limited-edition Spiders had titanium-like finished center consoles, without the "Alfa Romeo" sign and unlike serie speciales didn't have a limited edition plaque. All were offered with 17-inch alloys and electrically folded hood.

==== Edizione Elegante Spider 2002 ====
Spider Edizione Elegante was available only in Nero Met. and had two-tone leather seats, either black-light grey or black-red with matching side panels upholstery, equipped with 2.0 TS or 3.0 V6 24V.

==== Lux Spider 2002 ====
Two different Spider editions. Blue Lightning Met. exterior and 'tango' brown leather interior with blue electric hood. Grigio Chiaro Met. exterior and Black-Lys Grey Leather interior with black hood. 2.0 TS only with Blue Lightning Met. available also with 3.0 V6 24V.

==== Spider Sport Limited Edition 2002 ====
Spider available only in Nero Met. and Motus-like interior with black carpets, black upholstery and perforated red leather seats, equipped with 2.0 TS or 3.0 V6 24V.

==== Spider Elegant Limited Edition 2002 ====
Spider available only in Grigio Chiaro Met. with two-tone interior: black-tango leather, equipped with 2.0 TS or 3.0 V6 24V.

==== Spider Elegant Limited Edition 2002 ====
Spider available only in Blu Lightning Met. and Lys Grey Leather interior, equipped only with 3.0 V6 24V.

==== Edizione Nero Spider 2004 ====
Phase 3 Spider only, available from March 2004, limited to 30 cars in Austria with total 150 cars. Black metallic with black/silver cloth interior 2.0 JTS engine.

==== Spider Edizione 2004 ====
Phase 3 Spider only, available in Rosso Miro Pearl. or Blu Reims Met. only with 2.0 JTS engine. Interior either Red or Blue Cloth or Black Leather. Limited to 350 cars total. Limited to Medio trim.

== Prototypes ==
=== Vivace ===
Alfa Romeo Vivace Twin cars, coupé and spider, made as a preview of upcoming 916-series. Styled in 1986 by Diego Ottina at Pininfarina with cues from then-ready Alfa Romeo 164.

=== Proteo ===
Alfa 164-based concept from 1991, designed by Walter de Silva with styling cues from then-ready GTV/Spider design.

=== Vola ===
Concept car styled by Leonardo Fioravanti in 2000, based on Spider chassis with 3.0 V6 12V engine.
