= Alfa Romeo Spider (disambiguation) =

The Alfa Romeo Spider is a roadster first introduced in 1966.

Alfa Romeo Spider may also refer to:

- Alfa Romeo Spider (916) (1993-2004)
- Alfa Romeo Spider (939) (2006-2010)

== See also ==
- Giulia Spider, a trim level of the Alfa Romeo Giulia
