= Alfa GTV Cup =

Race series

The Alfa GTV Cup was a mono-make race series offered by Alfa Romeo for a selected customers. Participants could race against each other on a track with the 3.0-litre GTV race car. After a sports car driving lessons, participants were ready to manage ten races in the mono-make race programme.

== Overview ==
As the Alfa Romeo GTV was created to reestablish the sporty character of the marque, Alfa Romeo has created a series of events for their customers and racing enthusiasts with a GTV race car. With a cost of more than five million Italian lira, a participant could spend two weekends on the race track and participate in the mono-make race series. First there was a driving course at the Safe Driving Centre, conducted by Andrea de Adamich at the Varano Circuit, in order to teach racing techniques and safety. A brand new Alfa Romeo GTV race car was prepared for this programme, producing 230 PS, was also used as part of the Italian Supertourismo Championship series.

== Participants ==
The participants of the Alfa GTV Cup race series were chosen by Alfa Romeo. In total 160 of them were chosen as drivers. Sixteen drivers were competing in each of the ten races in the calendar. Participants had to pay a subscription fee which included sports car driving courses with Andrea De Adamich, a CSAI driving license, a fire-proof racing overalls and complete accommodations for the length of the event. Included were also all the expenses of the race cars. Drivers took part in the free trials, qualifications and the actual races.

== Cars ==
Alfa Romeo prepared sixteen cars for the Alfa GTV Cup. All have been adapted by Fiat Auto Racing in Chivasso and all were equal in performance, which is very important for a mono-make race series. The cars were prepared according to the Group N rules for production vehicles with only slight modifications. The new race car was first tested on track at the Varano Circuit.

From the outside the GTV Cup race car was distinguished by the full Zender-provided aero-kit, that was also available for the road car as well. It consisted of the front and rear spoilers and air vents in the front wings. The suspension was lowered to a total of 1,270 mm (50.0 in) height. Cars were equipped with Michelin racing tyres.

The engine was based on a production car's 3.0-litre V6 with 24 valves. Increased power output was achieved because of to the engine chip that re-mapped the fuel injection. The exhaust system was no longer obstructed by any lambda sensors or a catalytic converters. The engine oil cooler was repositioned to the middle.

The only additions were the racing steering wheel and OMP racing bucket seat. All the other seats and most of the interior trim was discarded to save approximately 200 kg.

The six-speed gearbox, based on the unit from the road car, received a long ratio upgrade. This came in effect on long circuits like Mugello or Monza where 260 km/h (162 mph) maximum speed can be achieved.

== Specifications ==
Engine: 2,959 cc (3.0 L; 180.6 cu in) 60° V6, 93 by 72.6 mm (3.7 by 2.9 in) of bore and stroke.
Max power: 230 PS (169 kW; 227 hp) at 6900 rpm.
Max torque: 28.5 kg⋅m (279 N⋅m; 206 lb⋅ft) at 5300 rpm.
Tyres: Michelin 20/61-16
Dimensions: height 1,270 mm (50.0 in)
Weight: 1,215 kg (2,679 lb)

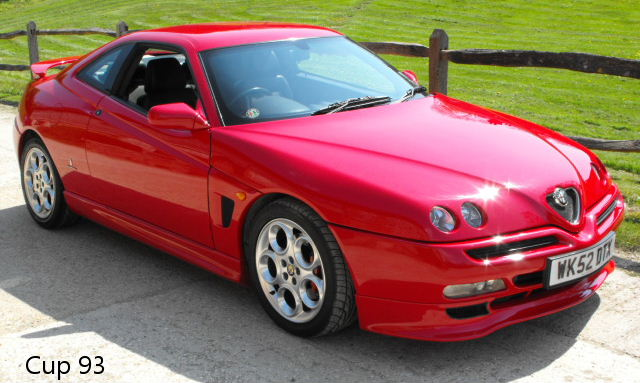
Alfa Romeo GTV 3.0 V6 24v Cup Ltd Edtn

== Road car ==
To commemorate this event, Alfa Romeo created a limited edition GTV Cup.
