= Ferrari Pinin =

Italian one-off concept car

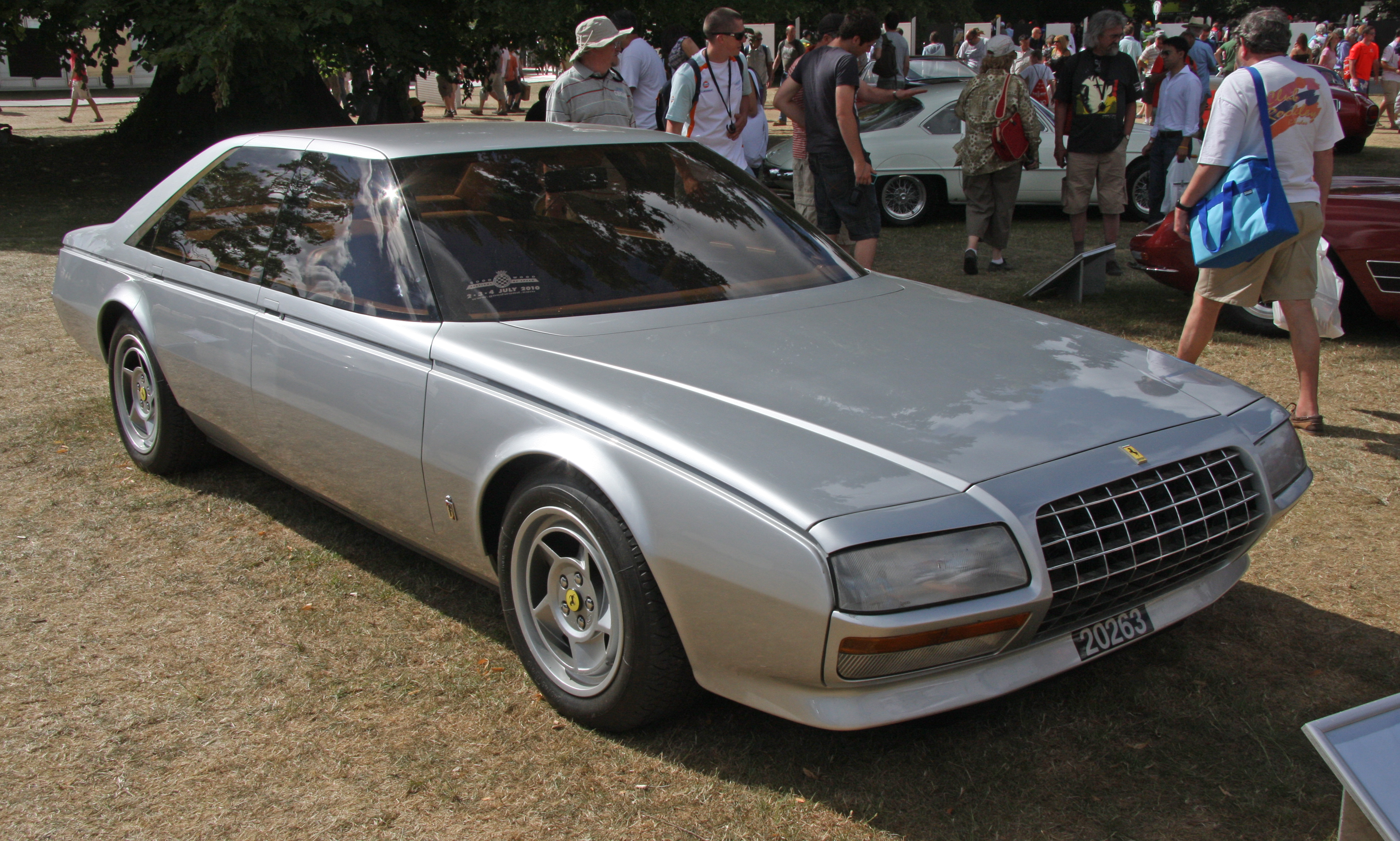

Overview
- Manufacturer: Pininfarina
- Production: 1980
- Designer: Leonardo Fioravanti at Pininfarina, details by Diego Ottina

Body and chassis
- Class: Concept car
- Body style: 4-door sedan
- Layout: FR layout
- Related: Ferrari 400GT

Powertrain
- Engine: 4.9 L Tipo F102 B flat 12 engine

The Ferrari Pinin was a one-off concept car created by Italian-design studio Pininfarina, to celebrate the design studio's 50th anniversary. Discussed by Enzo Ferrari as being turned into a production model, the proposal was dropped and the car remains a singular concept model, the first four-door Ferrari ever built.

== Background ==
Battista "Pinin" Farina had founded his design house in 1930, and after World War II began working with Enzo Ferrari on designing bodies for his road cars, to allow Ferrari to create funds to continue his motor car racing.

== Design ==
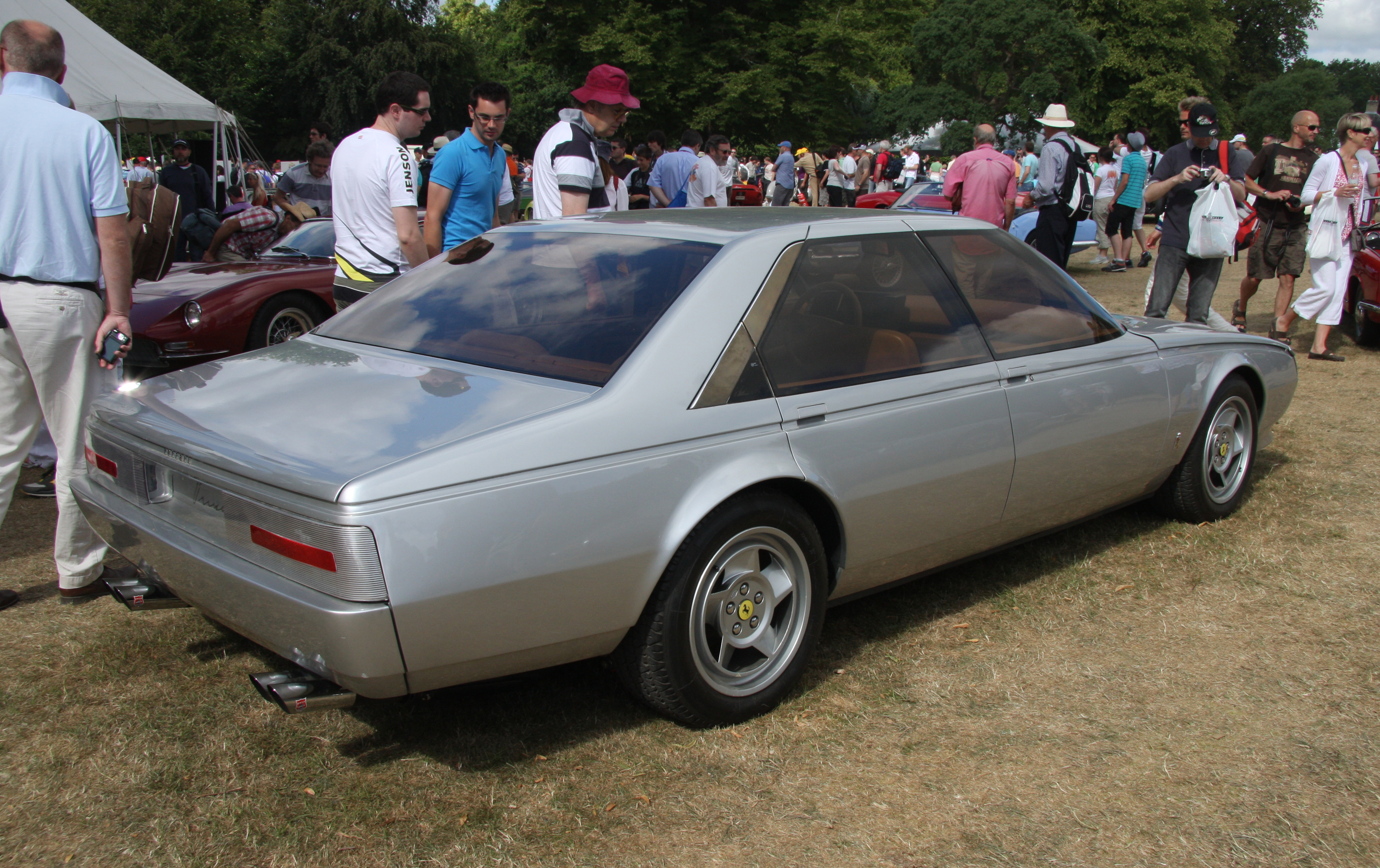
The rear of the Ferrari Pinin, showing the then unique body-coloured rear light cluster by Carello

The drive for the project came from Sergio Pininfarina, who had dreamed of designing an Italian competitor for luxury 4 door saloons like the Jaguar XJ, the Maserati Quattroporte (designed by rival Giugiaro), and the Mercedes-Benz 450SEL 6.9. The project was also personally approved by Enzo Ferrari and the general manager of Ferrari at the time, Eugenio Alzati. According to Alzati, since Ferrari was a subsidiary of Fiat at the time, Mr. Ferrari was obligated to use a Fiat 131 as his personal chauffeured transport. Mr. Ferrari found the 131 inadequate and therefore positively viewed a possible production Ferrari luxury sedan.

Leonardo Fioravanti led the design team, who had been responsible for most Pininfarina Ferrari designs since the 1960s, while detailed work was completed Diego Ottina. Fioravanti proposed a sporting sedan design, powered by a forward-located Ferrari flat-12 engine. New headlights from Lucas Industries allowed the front to be lowered, creating a thin egg-crate style grille. The design also included body-coloured rear lights by Carello, a concept which is now common on production vehicles. From the side, the A and B pillars were disguised by using smoked glass, and exaggerating the C pillar, creating a coupe-style side view.

The interior used tobacco-coloured Connolly leather, and a dashboard designed by Borletti, akin to that in the Aston Martin Lagonda.

== Production ==
The prototype was created at Pininfarina's studio, on a donor Ferrari 400GT chassis. The car included a mock-up flat 12, mated to the shell of a five-speed manual gearbox. The car was unveiled by Sergio Pininfarina at the 1980 Turin Auto Show. During 1980–81, the car toured multiple motorshows, including the 1980 Los Angeles Auto Show and the Carrozzeria Italiana exhibition in Pasadena, California.

Enzo Ferrari was so impressed that he discussed turning the design into a production vehicle. Despite Mr. Ferrari's initial enthusiasm, he ultimately did not approve the project at Ferrari's annual board meeting in 1980. Eugenio Alzati speculated that lack of support from Fiat's then-president Vittorio Ghidella doomed the production Pinin. Alzati believed than Ghidella saw the Pinin as a distraction from larger-scale projects that would help financially stabilize Fiat. Leonardo Fioravanti speculated that Ferrari's resistance to producing the car was due to the production quality of any resultant vehicle. "Faults" were accepted in sporting cars, but with the Pinin Ferrari would have been competing against the quality of experienced luxury sedan manufacturers including BMW, Mercedes-Benz and even Rolls-Royce.

== Collector ownership ==
In the mid-1980s the Pinin was sold to Jacques Swaters, a Belgian racing driver turned businessman and car collector who formerly ran Ecurie Francorchamps, a prominent privateer Ferrari endurance and sportscar racing team, as well as a dealership, Garage Francorchamps. The Pinin was put on static display for many years in the basement of Garage Francorchamps' showroom.

After being displayed at the 2005 Essen Motor Show to celebrate Pininfarina's 75th anniversary, the car was sold in 2008 by RM Auctions on behalf of Swaters for €176,000. The new owner sent the Pinin to former Ferrari chief engineer Mauro Forghieri's firm Oral Engineering with the brief to make it a running vehicle. The Oral Engineering team made multiple modifications to the Pinin, installing a Tipo F102 B flat 12 engine from a Ferrari 512 BB as well as other components either taken from other Ferrari models or custom-made. In order to fit the engine, the chassis was modified and strengthened. The original engine mounts were moved up and forward. A gearbox and differential from a 400 GT were installed. A bespoke fuel tank and wiring loom were also commissioned. Although the car had front and rear double wishbone independent suspension from a 400 GT installed from the beginning, suspension modifications were required to make it road-usable, including adjustment of ground clearance and replacement of non-functional springs. The conversion process took approximately 1.5 years.

The car first ran in March 2010, some 30 years after its first appearance. It was put up for sale later that year, but failed to make a reserve of €1 million. The car was put up for sale again by RM Auctions at their London sale on 26 October 2010, with a guide price of £480,000 – £550,000.

The car was on display at the Museo Ferrari in 2012, as part of a show of Pininfarina's ten greatest designs.

In July 2015, the Pinin was listed for sale on Hemmings.com with an asking price of US$795,000.

The car is currently owned by Ferrari collector Prof. Dr. Anthony Nobles in California. The car was displayed at The Quail Motorsports Gathering in August 2018. Nobles originally bid on the Pinin when it was sold at the Factory auction where he was outbid. He spent the next several years tracking down the car and acquired it in Maranello in 2017. The car is now in the Nobles Family Automotive Museum and makes the occasional drive down Pacific Coast Highway to Cars and Coffee.

== See also ==
- Aston Martin Lagonda
- Maserati Quattroporte
