= Scuttle shake =

Phenomenon in convertible cars

Scuttle shake (also known as cowl shake in the US) is the phenomenon sometimes experienced in convertible or open top automobiles where, due to lower structural rigidity caused by the lack of a roof, the middle section of the chassis flexes, causing the bulkhead in front of the passenger compartment to move and vibrate when the vehicle is subject to uneven road surfaces. Passengers feel it as a noticeable vibration and shudder.

To solve this, vehicle manufacturers have relied on additional bracing in the absence of a fixed roof to tie the body together. Traditionally reinforced floor sections and sill structures can add back some of the rigidity required to stop scuttle shake. The process includes fitting a strut bar and strut tower braces back to the firewall, this connects the two front suspension turrets and can help improve the torsional rigidity. Cars that are designed from the beginning to be open-top vehicles don’t suffer from this as much as convertibles that have been adapted from an existing vehicle.
