= Leonardo Fioravanti (engineer) =

Italian automobile designer (born 1938)

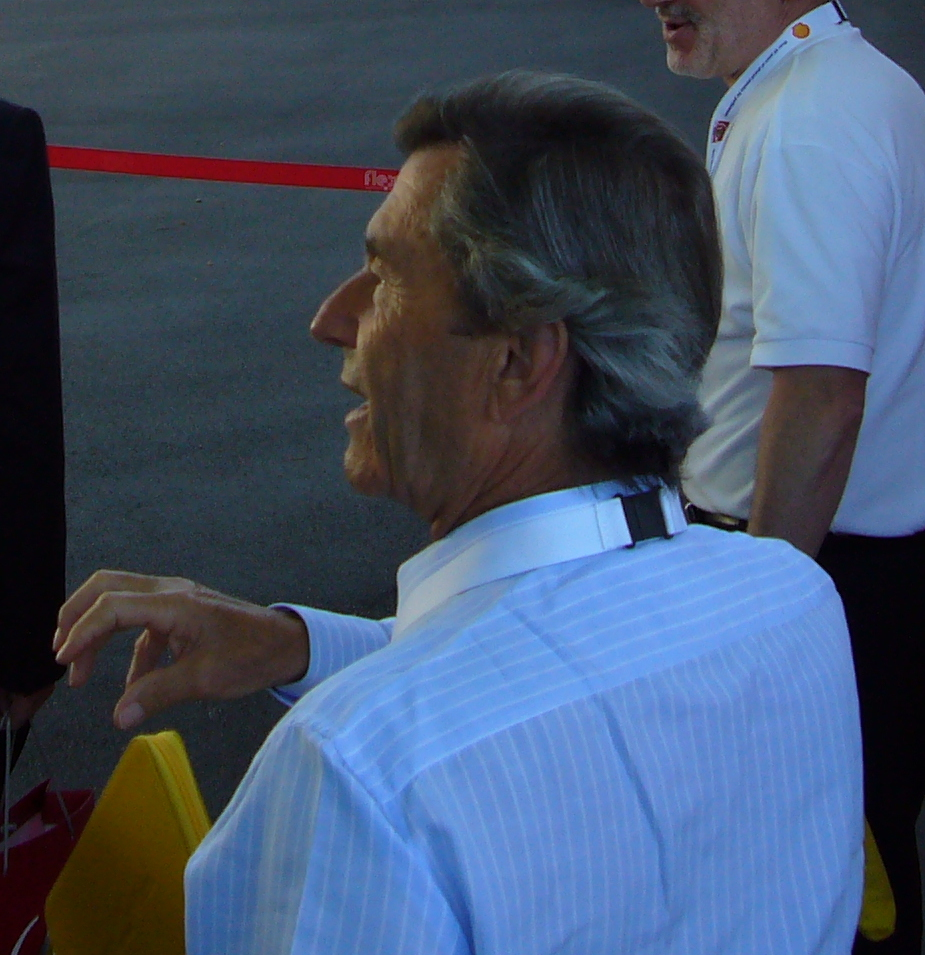
- Fioravanti in 2007
- Born: 31 January 1938 (age 88); Milan, Italy
- Education: Politecnico di Milano
- Occupation: Car designer
- Children: 2

Leonardo Fioravanti (born 31 January 1938) is an Italian automobile designer and CEO of Fioravanti Srl.

== Career ==
Born on 31 January 1938 in Milan, Fioravanti studied mechanical engineering at the Politecnico di Milano, specializing in aerodynamics and car body design. He worked twenty-four years with Pininfarina, joining as a stylist in 1964, aged 26, and eventually becoming Managing Director and General Manager of Pininfarina's research arm, Pininfarina Studi & Ricerche for 18 years.

He then joined Ferrari as a Deputy General Manager, and in 1989 moved to Fiat's Centro Stile as Director of Design.

In 1991, he left Fiat to focus on his company, Fioravanti Srl, which evolved from an architecture studio to a design studio. His two sons, Matteo, an architect, and Luca, an attorney, have also worked with him at his company. Fioravanti developed a number of prototype and concept cars, often displayed under his own name. In 2012, he was appointed by the Chinese automobile company BAIC Group as a design consultant.

In 2009, Leonardo Fioravanti was elected Chairman of ANFIA Car Coachbuilders Group for a 3-year mandate from 2009 to 2011.

Octane magazine awarded Fioravanti the International Historic Motor Award Lifetime Achievement Award in 2017.

== Cars designed by Fioravanti ==
During his time with Pininfarina, Fioravanti designed several Ferraris:

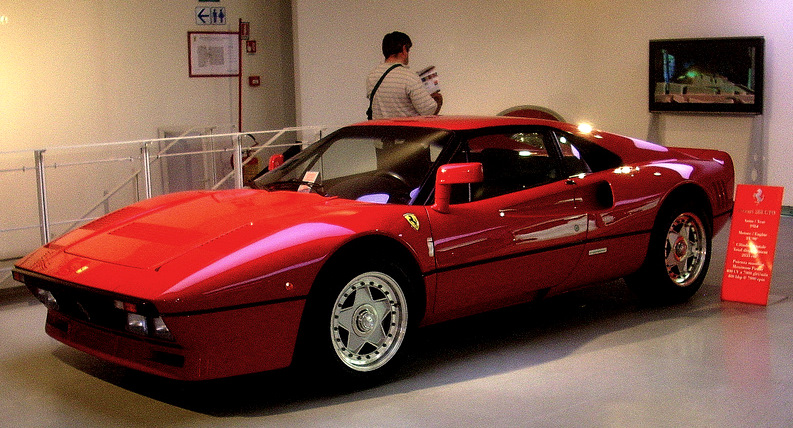
Ferrari 288 GTO

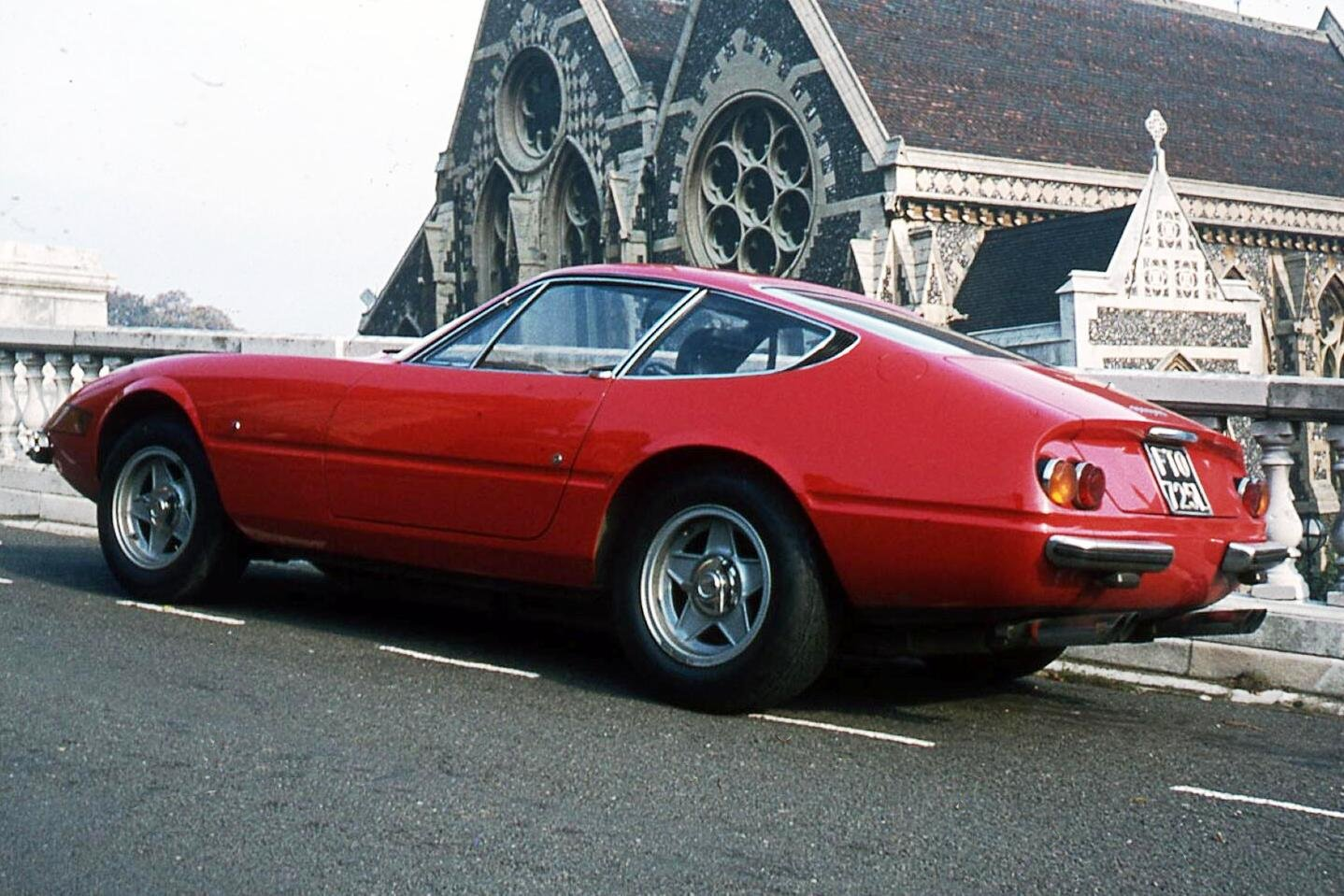
Ferrari 365GTB, popularly known as the Daytona

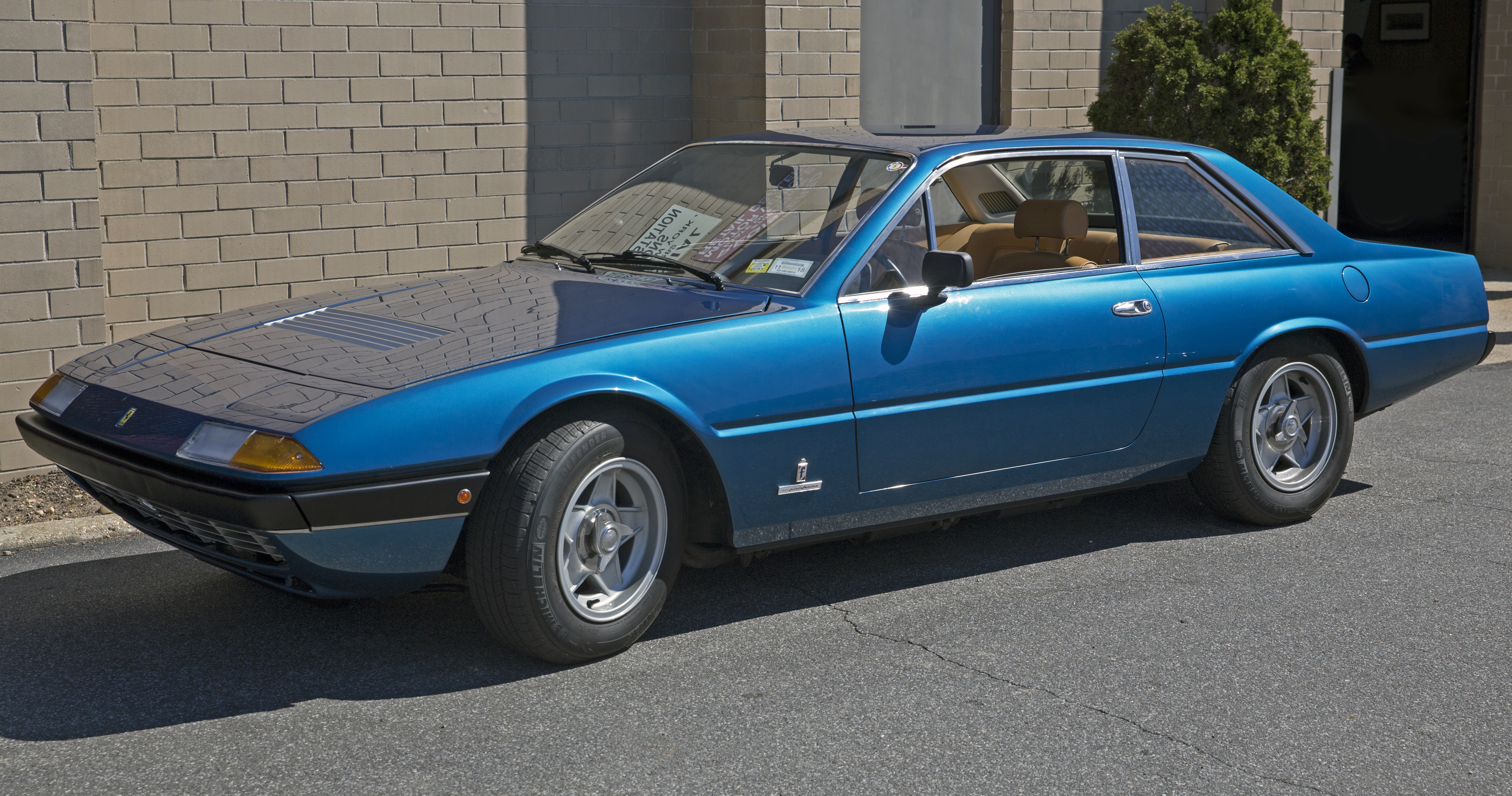
Ferrari 365 GT4 2+2

- Ferrari 365 GTB/4 Daytona
- Ferrari P6 Berlinetta Speciale (concept car presaging the Berlinetta Boxer)
- Ferrari 365 GT4 2+2 (the forerunner of the Ferrari 400 and Ferrari 412)
- Ferrari 308 GTB
- Ferrari 328
- Ferrari 512 Berlinetta Boxer
- Ferrari 288 GTO
- Ferrari Testarossa (with Diego Ottina)
- Ferrari Mondial
- Ferrari 348 (the forerunner of the Ferrari F355)
- Ferrari 250 P5 Berlinetta Speciale
- Alfa Romeo 33/2 Coupé Speciale
- Ferrari Pinin
- Lancia Gamma saloon

Ferraris designed under Fioravanti Srl:

- Ferrari Superamerica
- Ferrari SP1

Fioravanti has designed many concept cars including:

- Alfa Romeo Vola
- Lexus LFA 2005 Concept
- Fioravanti Hidra (2008)
- BAIC C80K (2012)
- BAIC C90L
- BAIC S900
