= Alfa Romeo Vola =

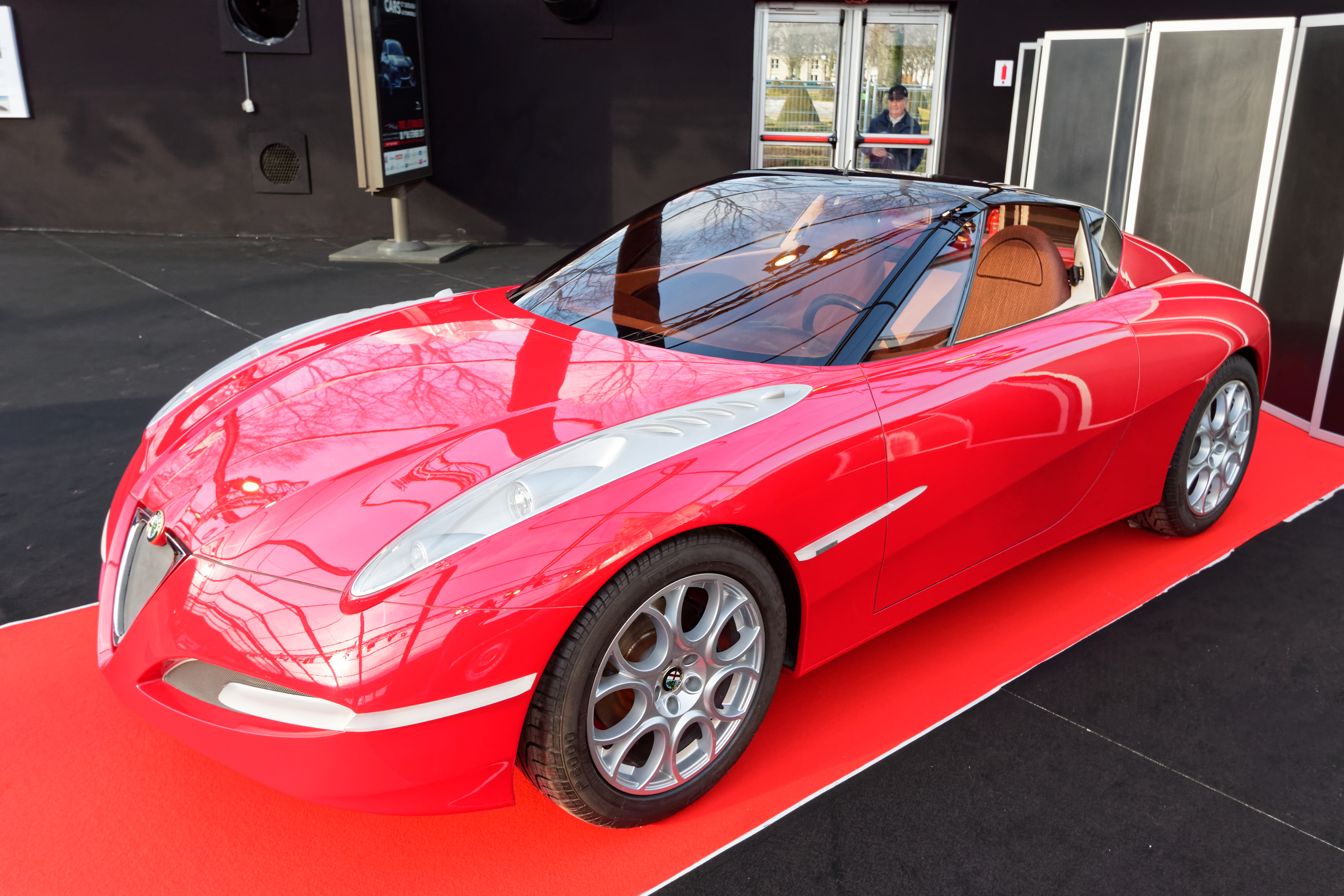

Overview
- Manufacturer: Fioravanti S.r.l. and Alfa Romeo
- Also called: Fioravanti Vola
- Production: 2000
- Designer: Leonardo Fioravanti

Body and chassis
- Class: Concept car
- Body style: 2-door roadster
- Layout: Front-engine, front-wheel-drive
- Related: Alfa Romeo Spider

Powertrain
- Engine: 3.0L Alfa Romeo 12V V6
- Transmission: 5-speed manual

Dimensions
- Wheelbase: 2,540 mm (100 in)
- Length: 4,160 mm (163.8 in)
- Width: 1,810 mm (71.3 in)
- Height: 1,280 mm (50.4 in)

The Alfa Romeo Vola is a concept car designed by Leonardo Fioravanti in 2000. The car was presented for the first time at the 2001 Geneva Motor Show. One of its most notable features is a rotating glass roof. The deck lid hinges are concentric with the top, so the trunk access is freely available, as the open roof sits on top of the trunk lid. Originally livered in black with red interior, the Vola was shown at the 2005 Geneva Motor Show with a red paint and brown upholstery. The same idea was later used in the Ferrari Superamerica from 2005, also designed by Fioravanti and patented as a Revocromico roof. In 2008 the rear buttresses of the Vola were remodelled similar to the Superamerica. Fioravanti also refers to the car as the "Alfa Romeo LF."

== Technical specifications ==
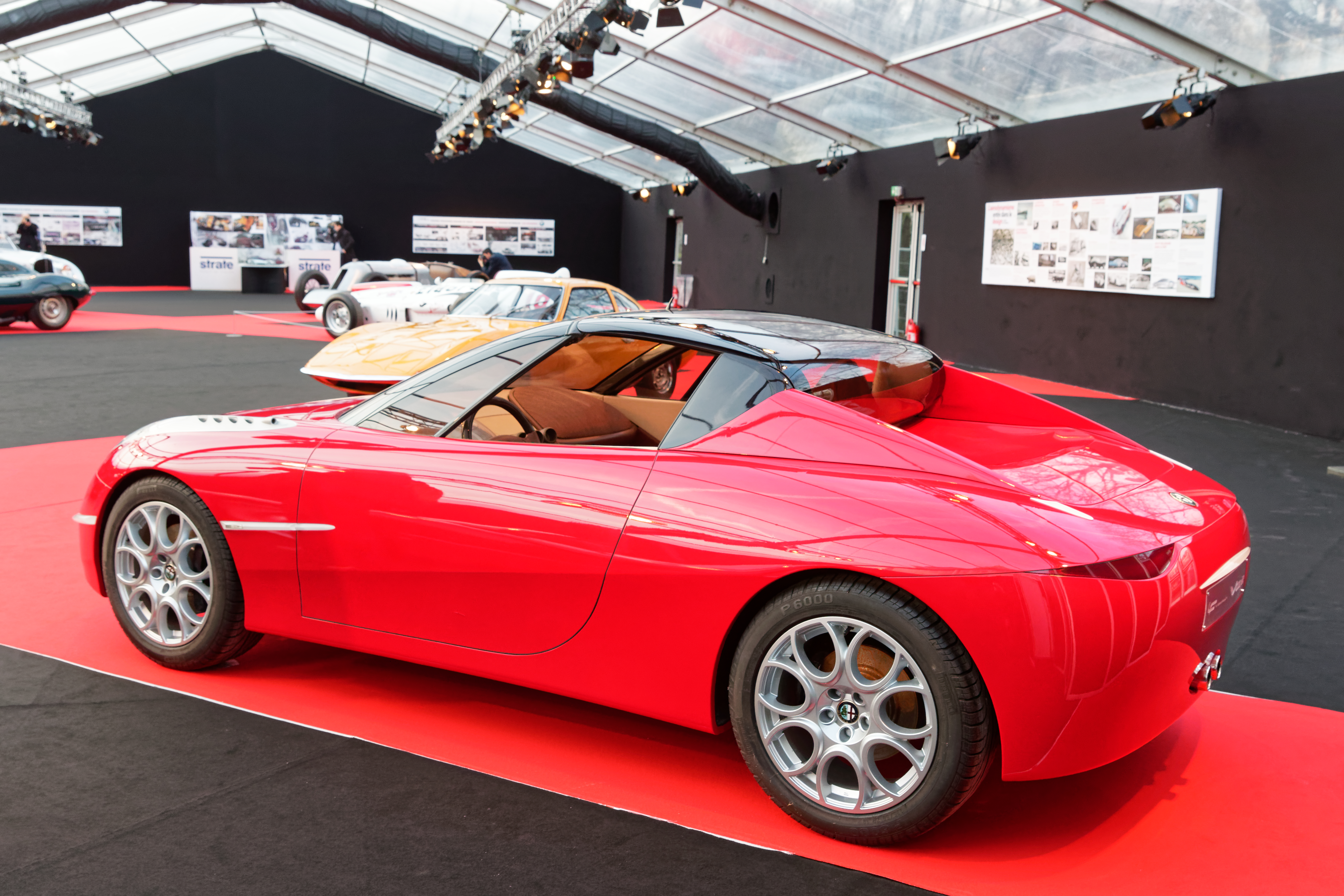
Side view in 2017 (with the redesigned buttresses)

The Vola is powered by a front mounted transverse 2,959 cc (180.6 cu in; 3.0 L) V6 with 2 valves per cylinder producing 192 PS (141 kW; 189 hp). The engine is paired to a 5-speed manual transmission sending power to the front wheels. Its chassis is derived from the 916 Spider.
