= Marco Tencone =

Italian automobile designer (born 1967)

Marco Tencone (born 1967) is an Italian automotive and industrial designer, known for his design of Lancia concept cars.

== Career ==
Tencone has previously been with the Pininfarina design company, developing designs for car makers such as Honda and Ferrari, as well as other industrial manufacturers such as the French maker of motoring boats, Beneteau. His superior at Pininfarina was Enrico Fumia (born 1948), and when he in 1992 became the director of the new Centro Stile Lancia design group, Tencone joined him there. Under Michael Vernon Robinson (born 1956) he did the Lancia Dialogos in 1996, which became the Lancia Thesis production car, and he subsequently became the exterior chief designer of Lancias. The 2002 Fulvia concept was his, under the direction of Flavio Manzoni (born 1965) who in 2010 went to Ferrari as design director. In 2004 Tencone succeeded Michael Vernon Robinson as chief designer, Robinson since then moving to Gruppo Bertone. Around 2009, Tencone was added responsibility for the Maserati and Alfa Romeo designs as well, and was in 2014 holding the position as head of design of Maserati, Alfa Romeo and Lancia automobiles. It was in late 2015 reported that he was replaced at Alfa Romeo by Scott Kruger, remaining only at Lancia and Fiat.

=== Cars he was responsible for ===
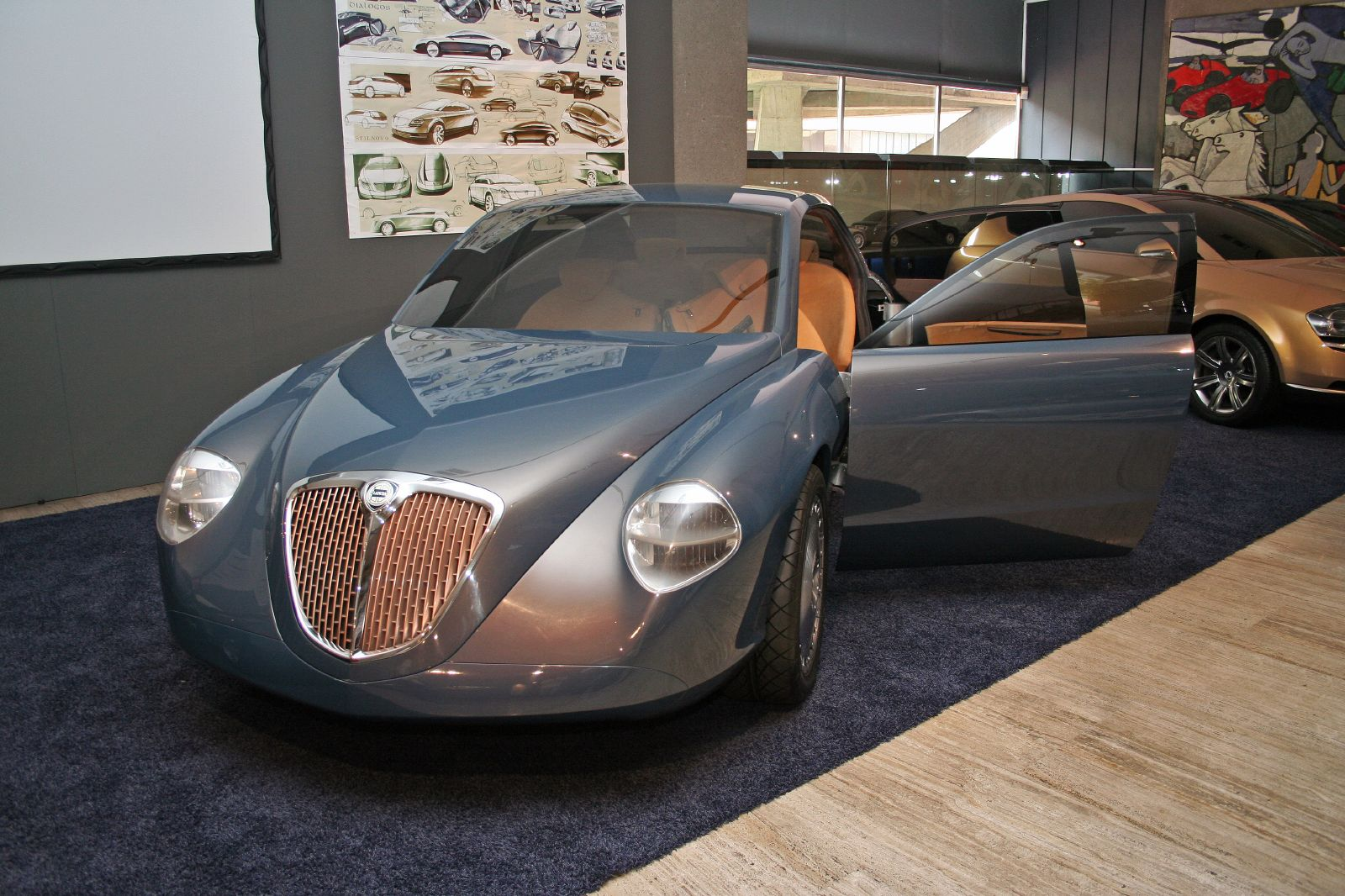
Lancia Dialogos concept (1998)

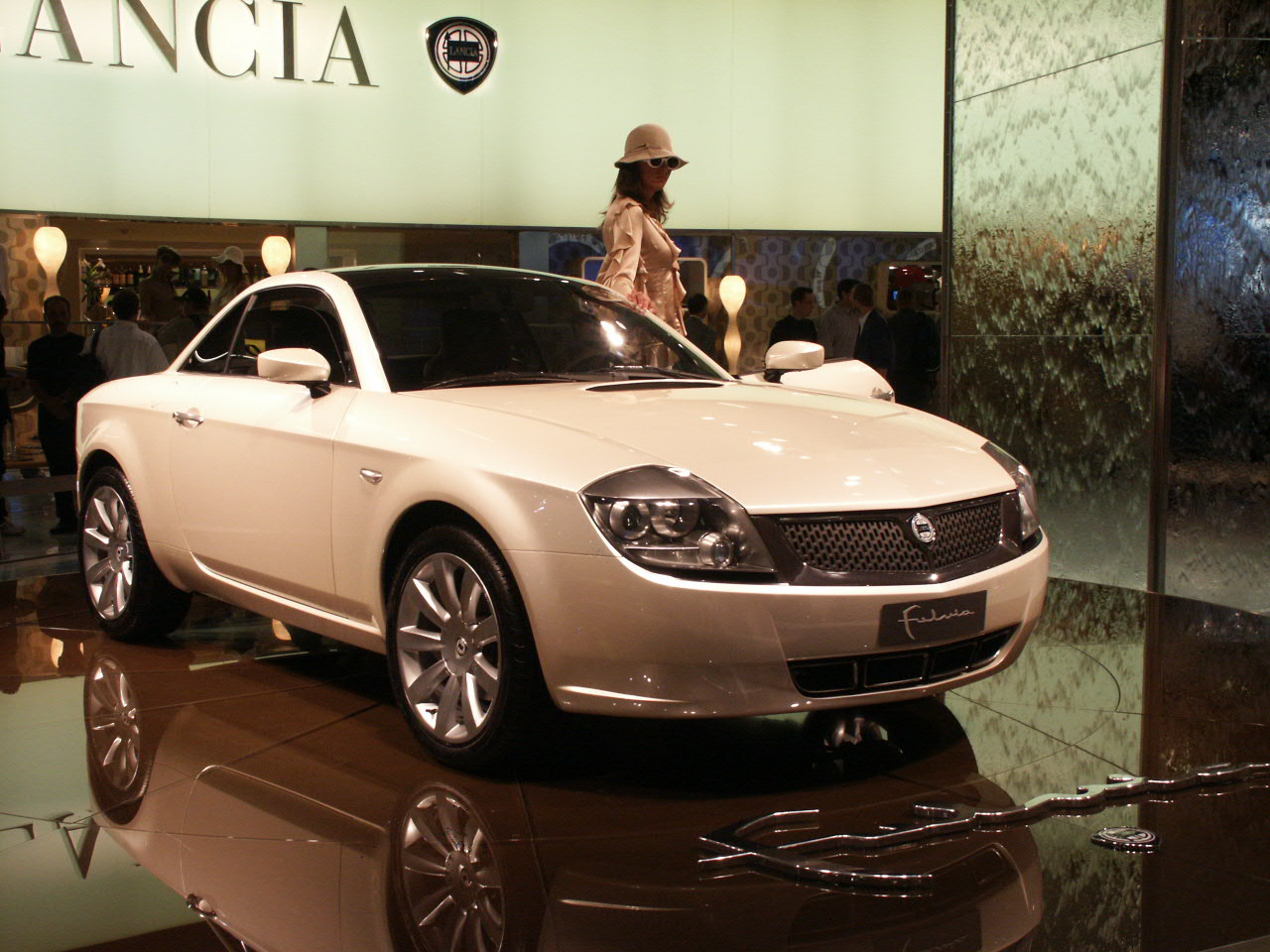
Lancia Fulvia concept (2003)

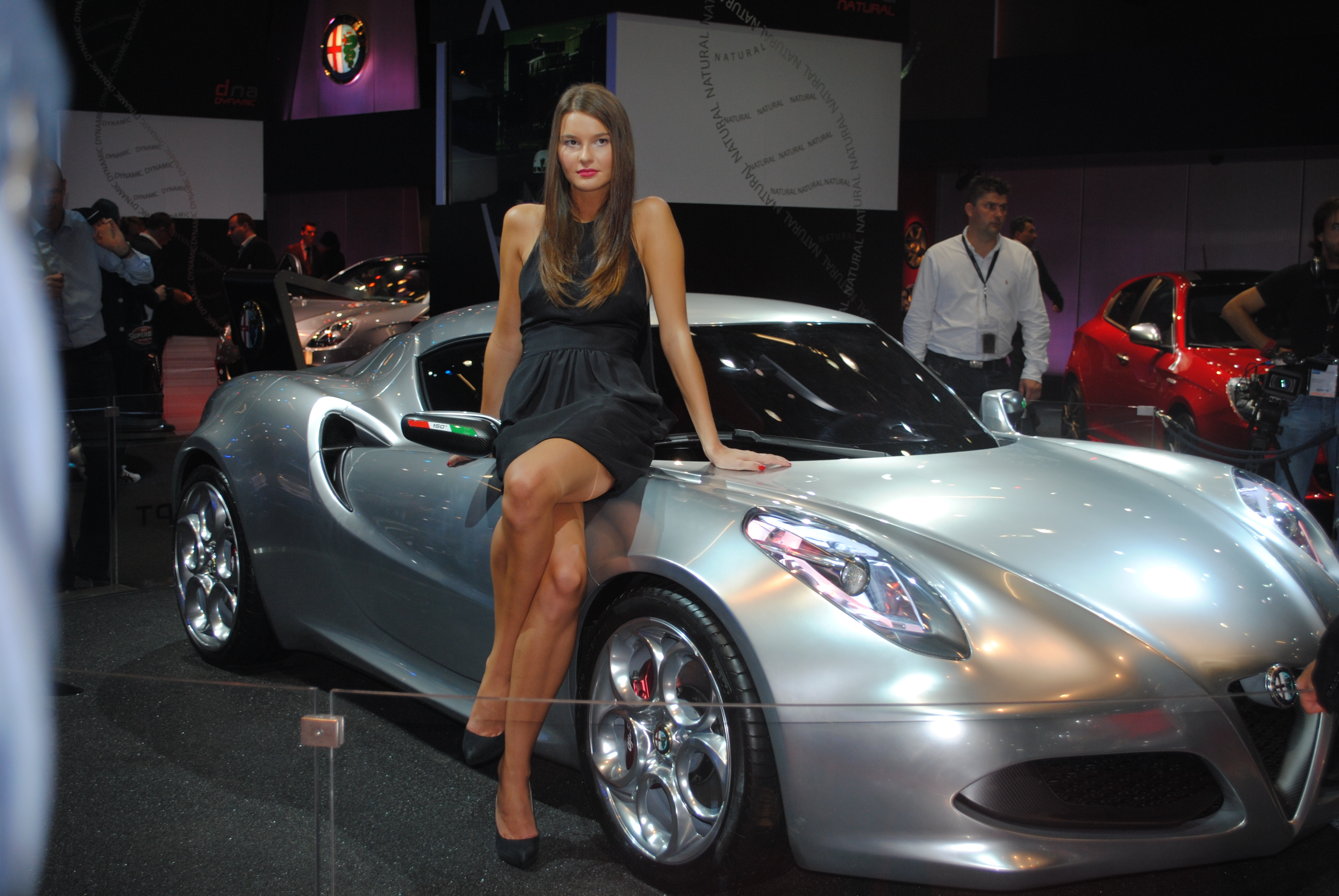
Alfa Romeo 4C concept (2011)

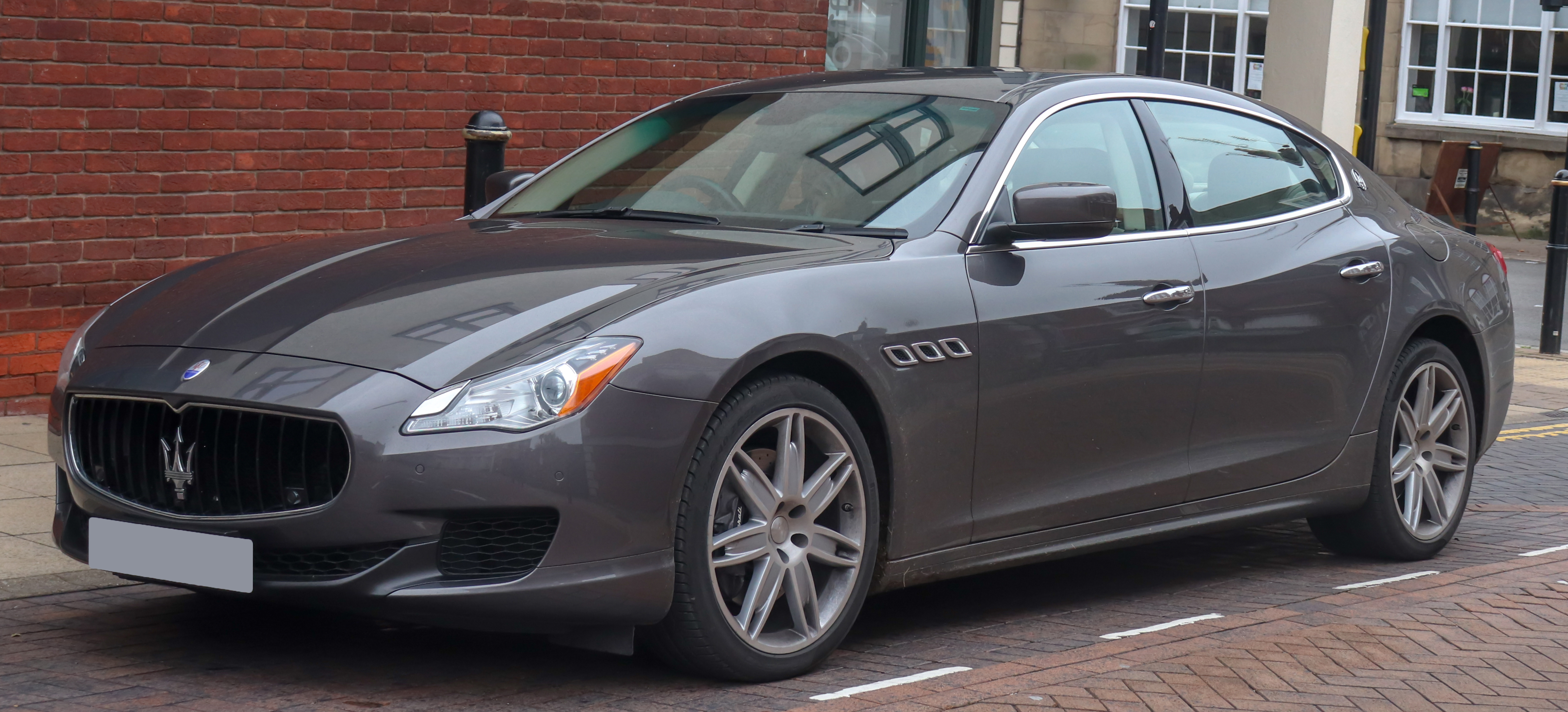
Maserati Quattroporte (2012)

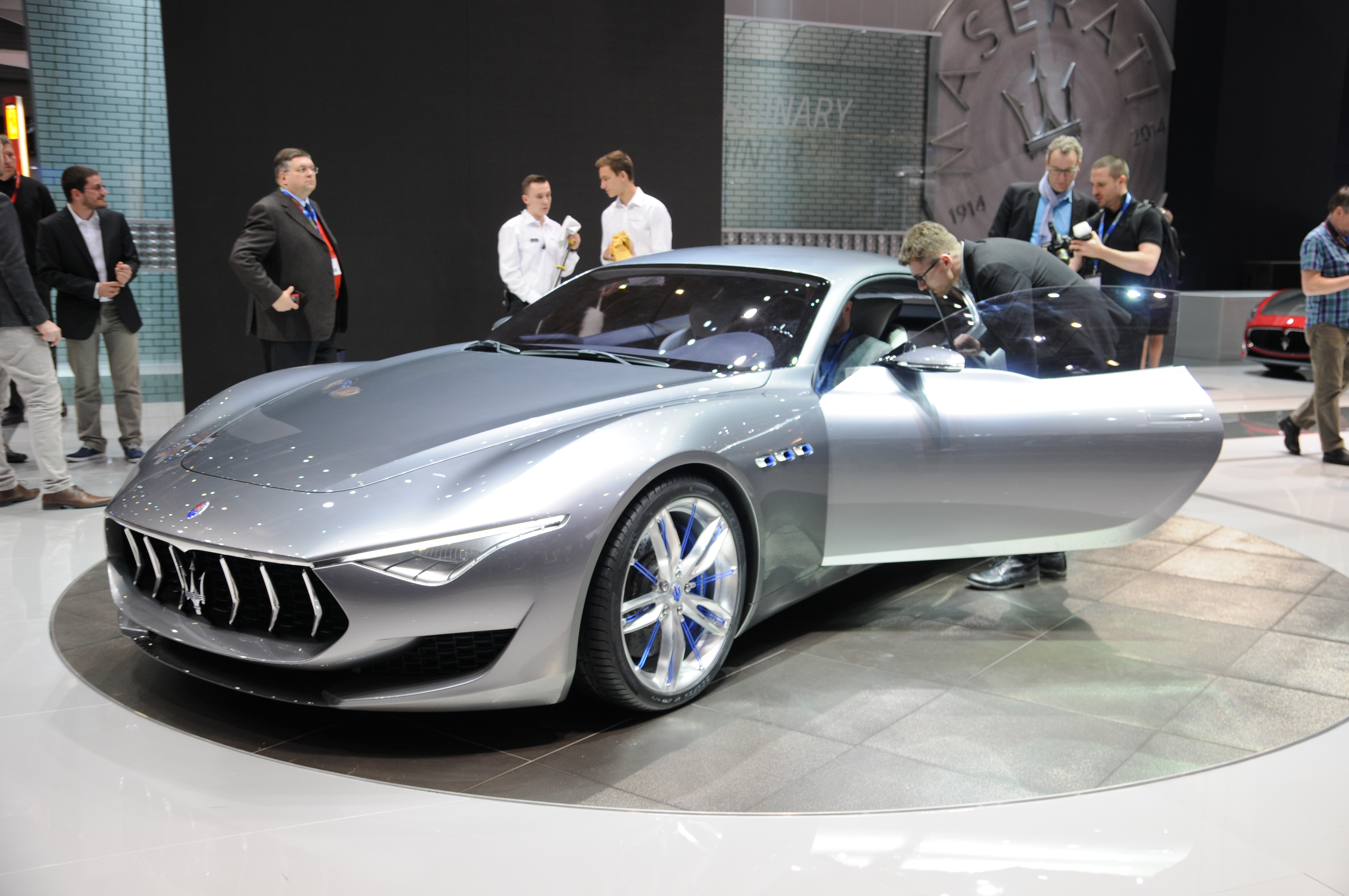
Maserati Alfieri concept (2014)

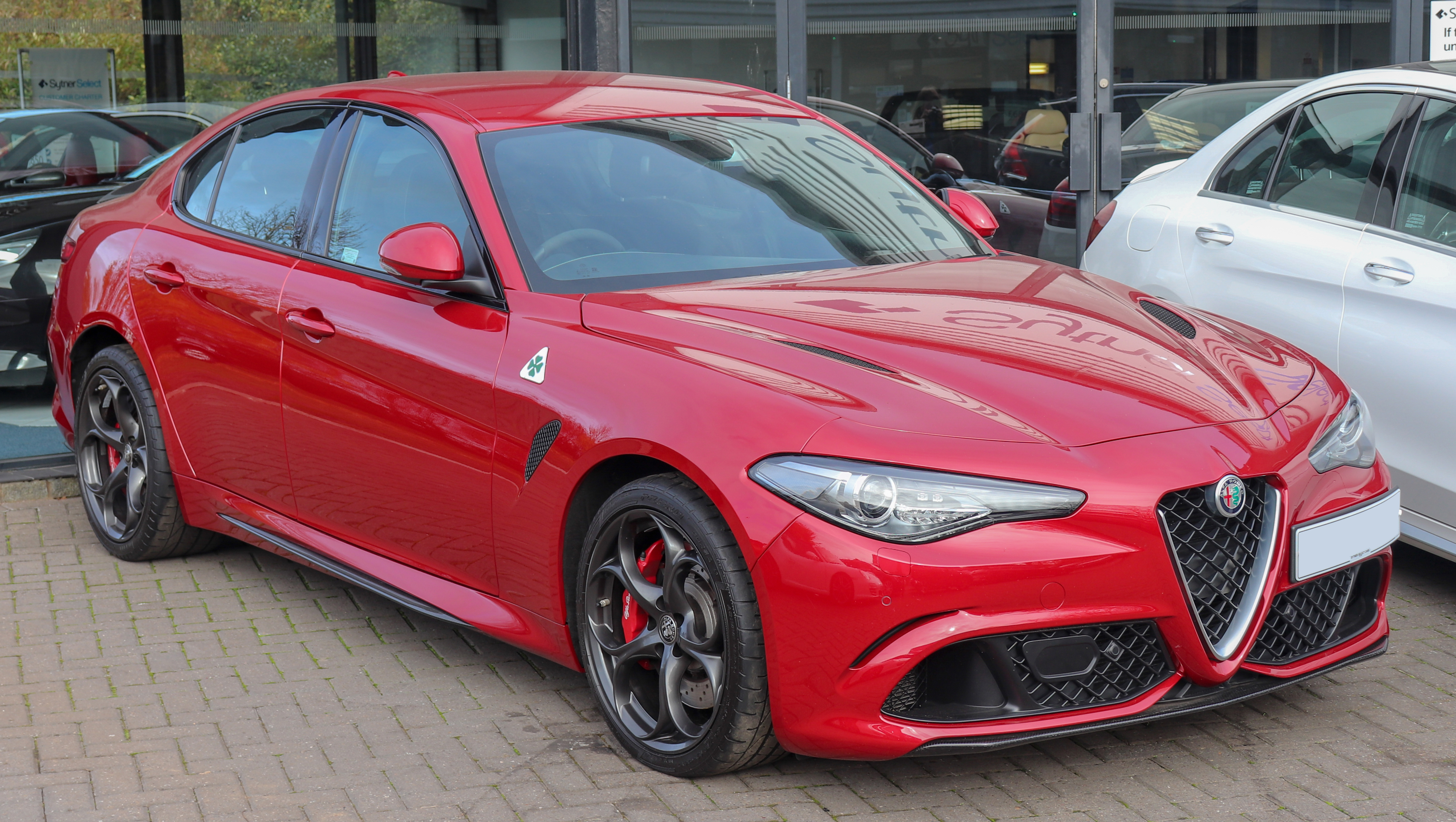
Alfa Romeo Giulia (2016)
