= Maserati Alfieri =

Maserati Alfieri Concept
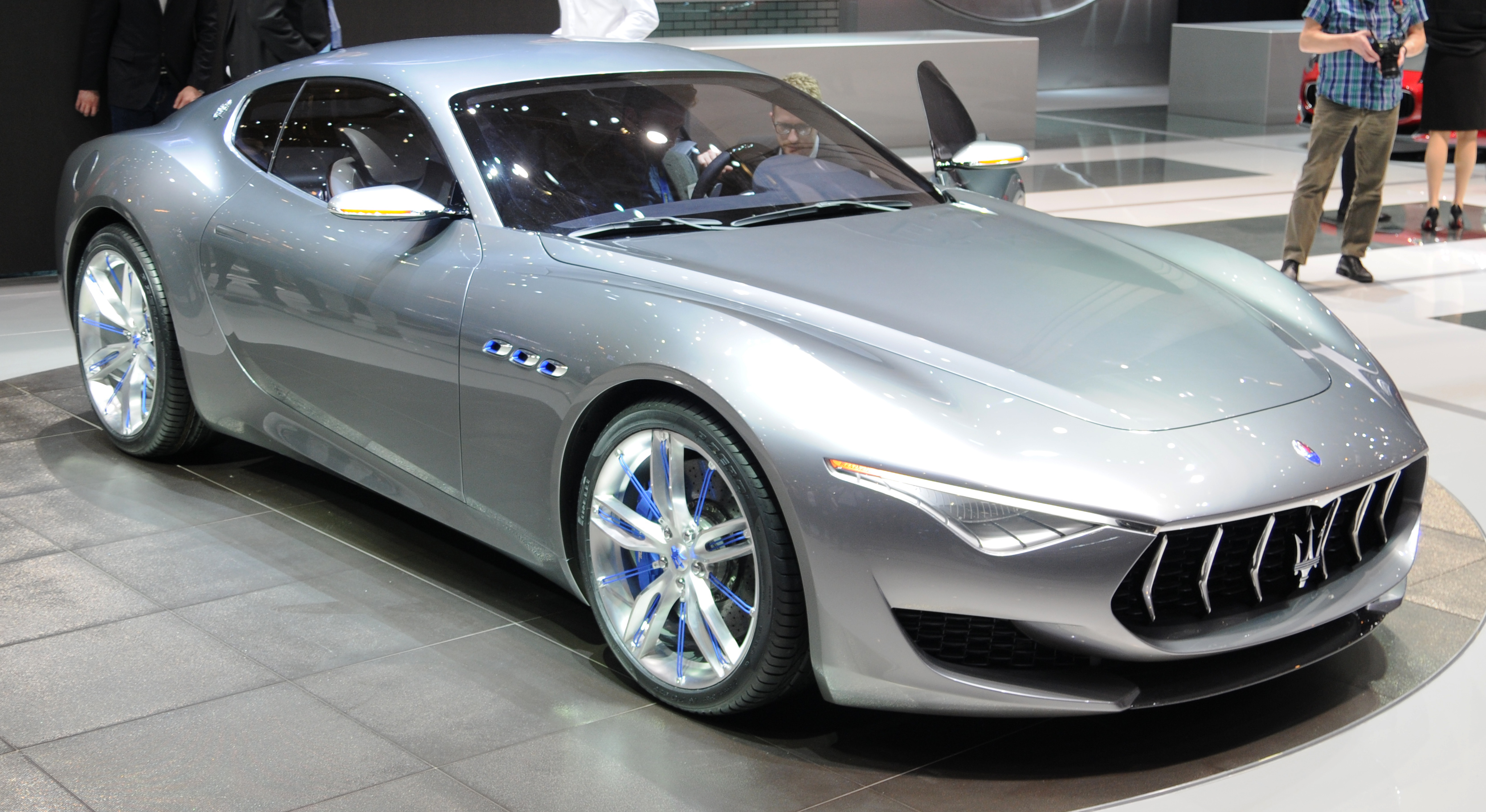

Overview
- Manufacturer: Maserati
- Production: 2014 (concept)
- Assembly: Italy: Modena
- Designer: Giovanni Ribotta under Marco Tencone at Centro Stile Maserati

Body and chassis
- Class: Concept car (S)
- Body style: 2-door coupé
- Layout: Front-engine, rear-wheel-drive / all-wheel-drive

Powertrain
- Engine: 4.7 L Ferrari-Maserati F136 YS V8
- Transmission: 6-speed MC-Shift automated manual

The Maserati Alfieri is a concept car from the Italian car manufacturer Maserati. It was shown at the 2014 Geneva Motor Show.

== Concept ==
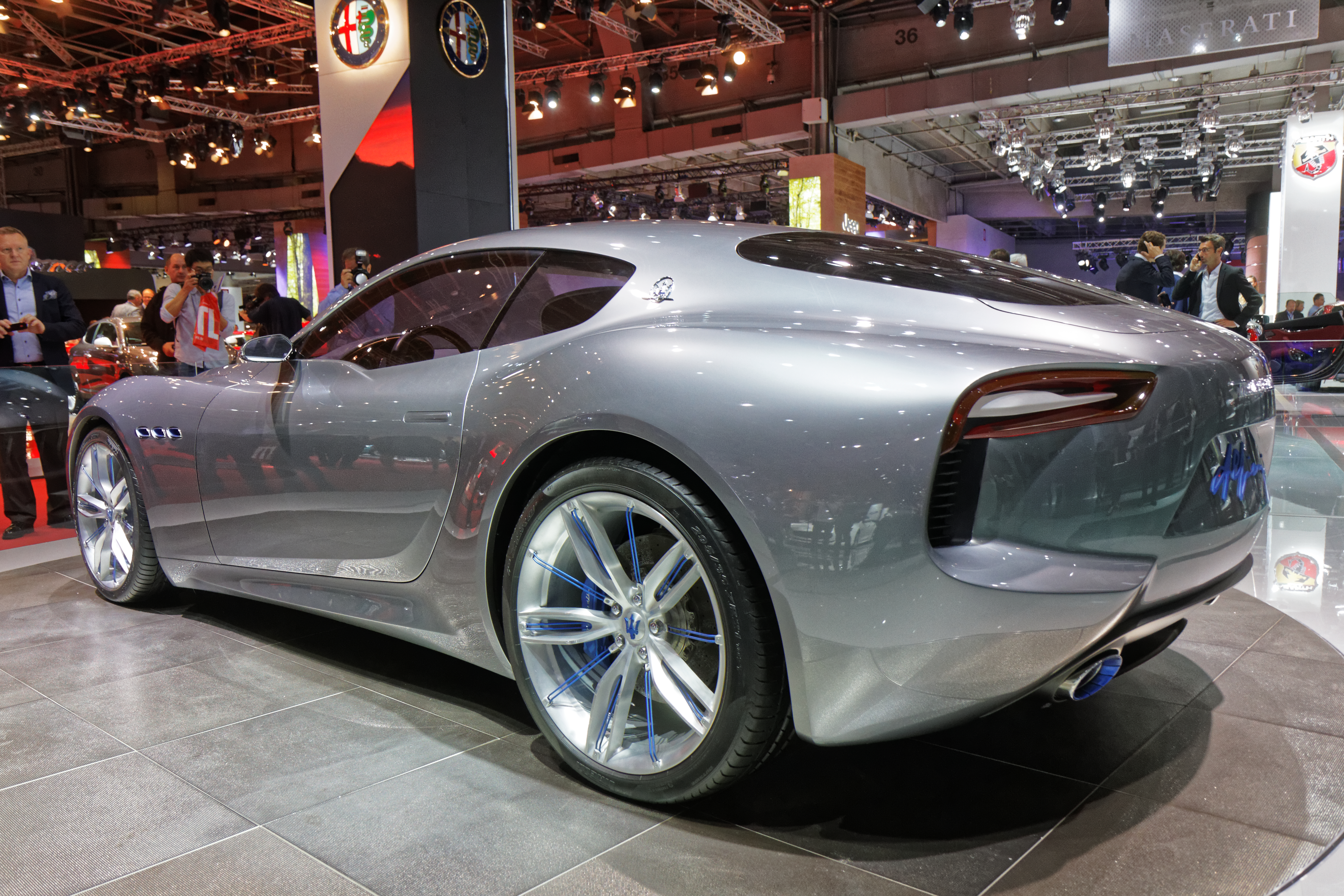
Rear view

The car is named after Alfieri Maserati (1887–1932), one of the five Maserati Brothers, and marks the 100 year anniversary of the carmaker, which was established in 1914 at Bologna. It was developed at the Centro Stile Maserati in Turin. The chief designer was Marco Tencone, while the exterior chief designer was Giovanni Ribotta. The project was managed by Lorenzo Ramaciotti, who has been the director of Centro Stile since 2007 and in 2014 was the head of Fiat-Chrysler Global Design.

The Alfieri uses design elements of the Maserati A6 GCS/54 designed by Pininfarina in 1954. It is based on the chassis of the Maserati GranTurismo MC Stradale with a shorter wheelbase of 24 cm, equipped with a locking transaxle and Ferrari-derived 4.7-litre V8 engine rated at 460 hp (343 kW) and 520 N⋅m (384 lbf⋅ft) at 4750 rpm.

== Production version ==
The Alfieri was confirmed for production in 2016 at a Fiat Chrysler event on 6 May 2014 but was delayed to 2020 at the earliest. According to reports, the Alfieri was to be offered with three V6 engine choices, rated at 410 hp (306 kW; 416 PS), 450 hp (336 kW; 456 PS) and 520 hp (388 kW; 527 PS). The 450-horsepower and 520-horsepower versions were said to only have an all-wheel-drive system.

The Alfieri was reported to be joined by a convertible variant in 2021 after the coupe's introduction. An electric version was planned for 2021 at the earliest.

In June 2018, Maserati announced that the Alfieri would be offered as a plug-in hybrid from 2021 and as an electric vehicle from 2020 with three electric motors and all-wheel-drive. Further, the Alfieri coupe and convertible would replace the Maserati GranTurismo and GranCabrio.

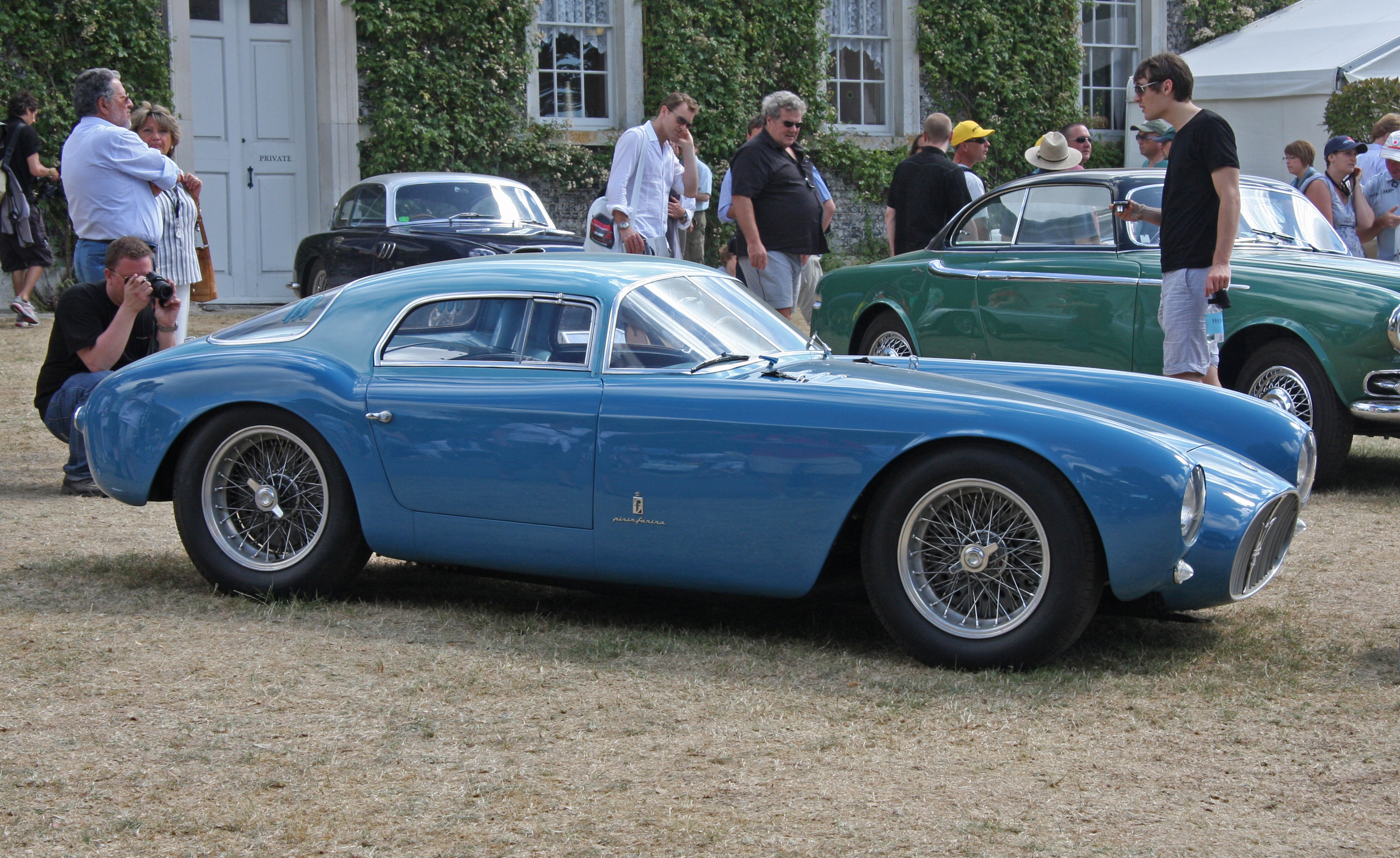
1954 Maserati A6 GCS/54 was an inspiration for the new Alfieri design in 2014.

In 2019, it was announced by Maserati's then-executive chairman Harald Wester that the Alfieri would enter mass production in 2021 or 2022. However, as of the Stellantis merger that incorporated FCA in 2021, production is yet to commence. In mid-2021, it was confirmed that a new GranTurismo prototype using styling cues from the Alfieri was being test-driven, with options for an electric drivetrain as well as V6 and V8 engines.
