= Bertone Nuccio =

Concept car designed by Bertone

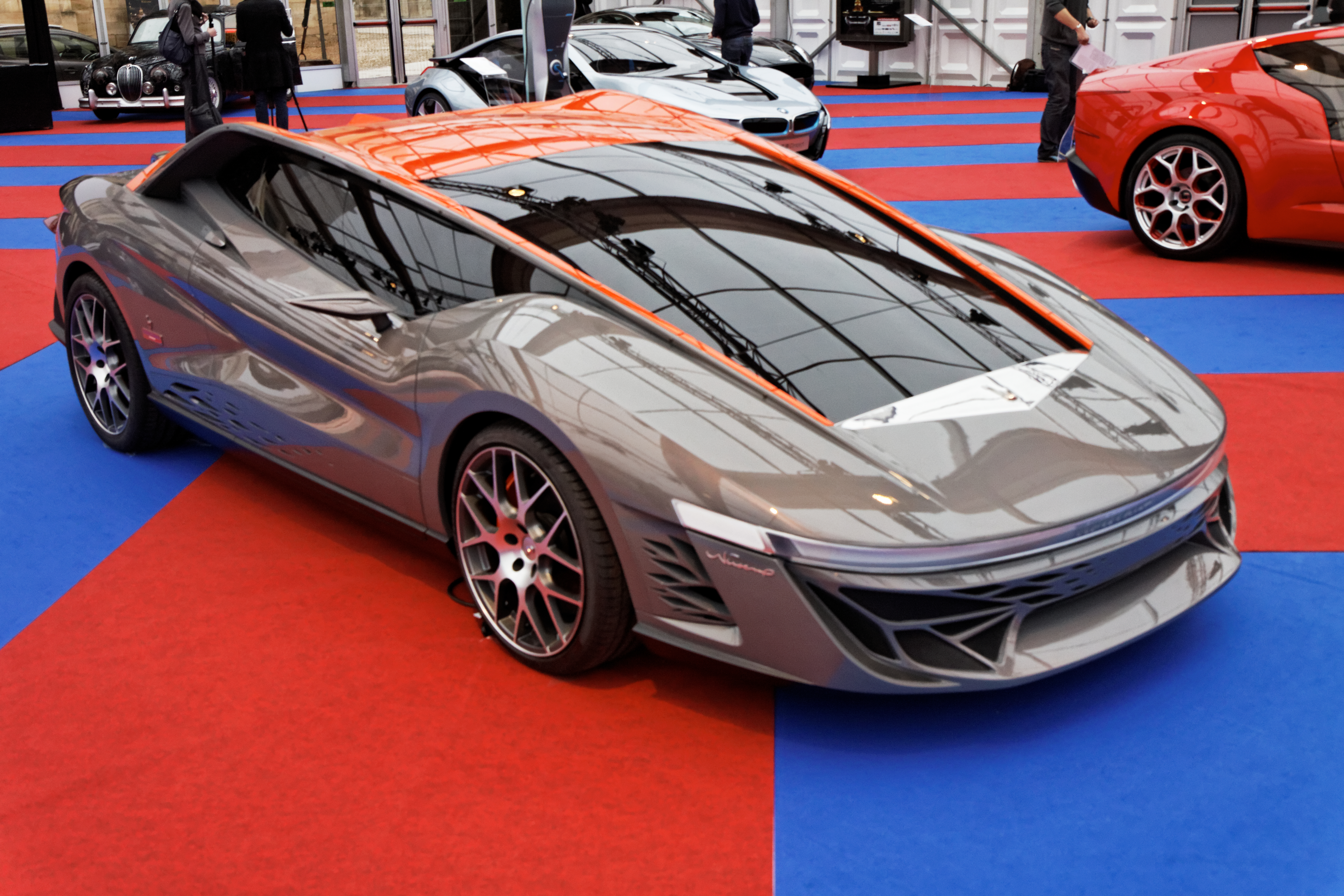

Overview
- Manufacturer: Bertone
- Designer: Mike Robinson at Bertone

Body and chassis
- Class: Concept car
- Body style: 2-door coupé
- Doors: Swan doors

Powertrain
- Engine: 4.3 L Ferrari F136E V8
- Power output: 430 bhp (321 kW; 436 PS)

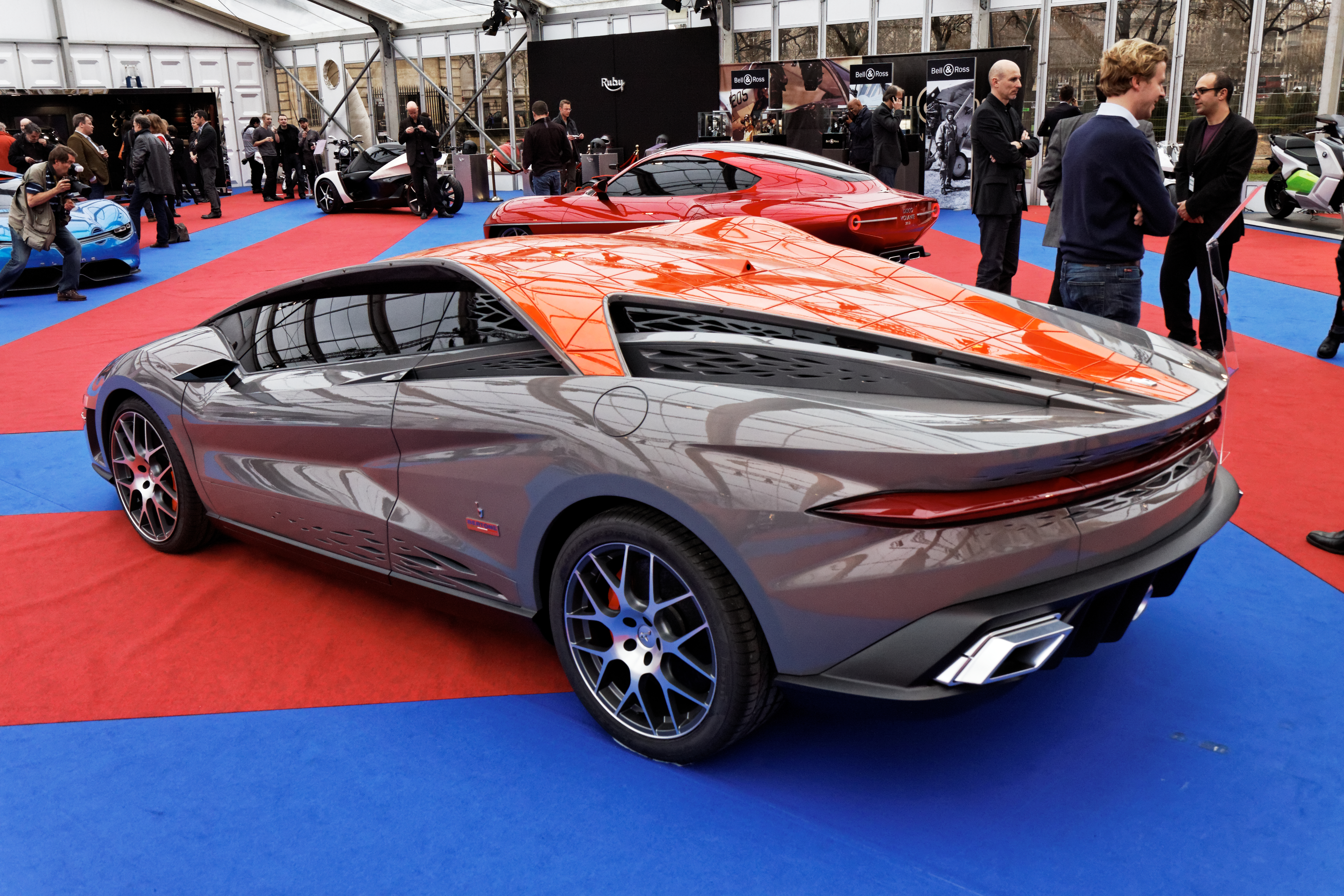
Rear view

The Bertone Nuccio is a concept car designed and developed by the Italian design house Bertone to celebrate the company's 100th anniversary. It was first shown to the public at the 2012 Geneva Motor Show and was the last car designed by Bertone to have the Bertone name, and was the second-last car designed by Bertone before its bankruptcy in 2014.

The two-door Nuccio was designed by Bertone Design Director Michael Robinson and is powered by a mid-mounted 430 bhp (321 kW; 436 PS) V8 engine.

It is named after Nuccio Bertone, the son of the founder of the Bertone, Giovanni Bertone.
