= Alfa Romeo Pandion =

Concept car designed by Bertone to celebrate Alfa Romeo's 100 year anniversary

Alfa Romeo Pandion Concept
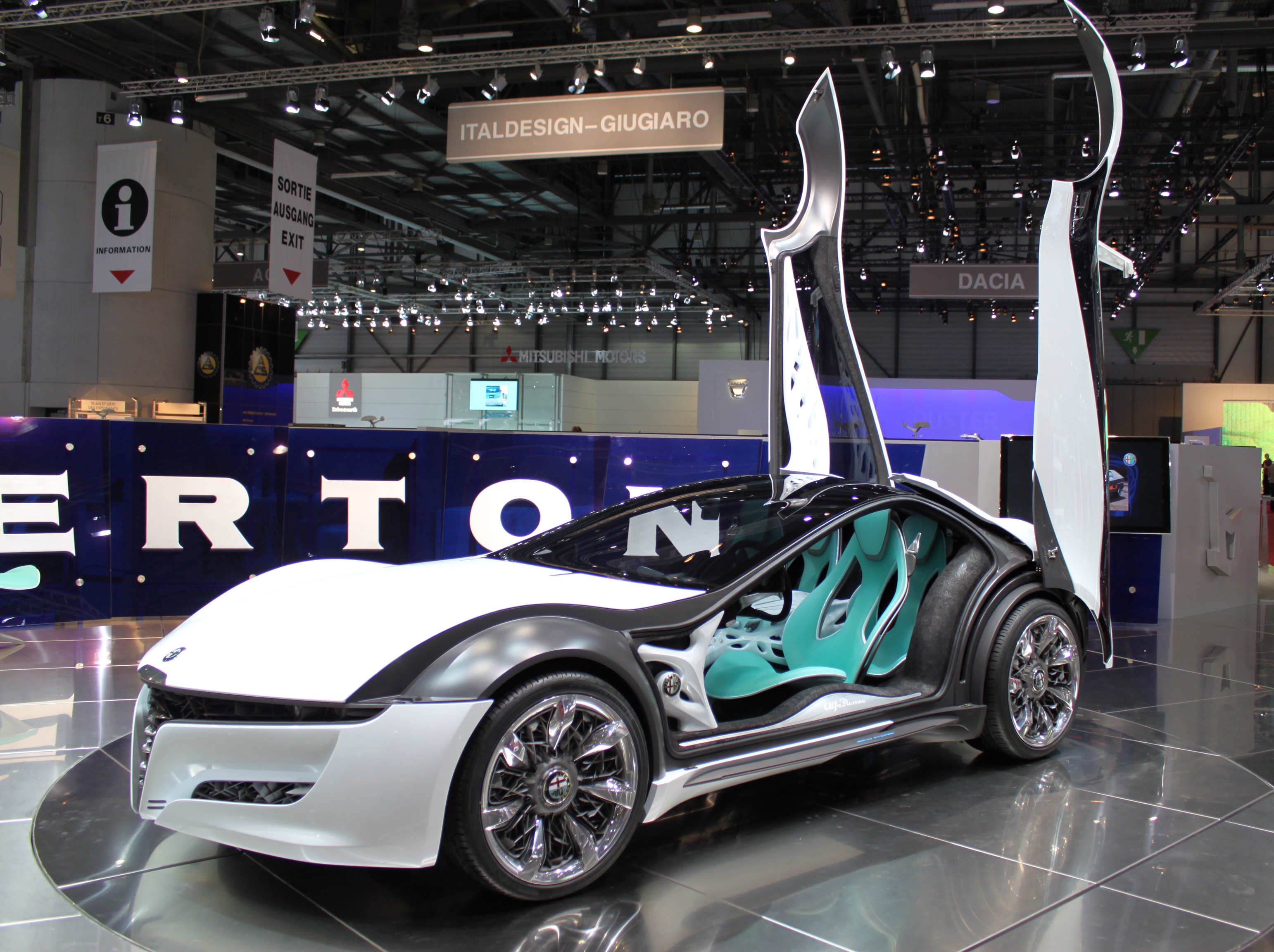

Overview
- Manufacturer: Bertone
- Designer: Mike Robinson at Bertone

Body and chassis
- Class: Concept car
- Body style: 2-door coupe
- Layout: Front-engine, rear-wheel-drive
- Doors: Suicide scissor doors
- Related: Alfa Romeo 8C Competizione

Powertrain
- Engine: 4.7 L (4,691 cc) 90° Ferrari/Maserati F136 Y V8

Dimensions
- Wheelbase: 2,650 mm (104.3 in)
- Length: 4,620 mm (181.9 in)
- Width: 1,942 mm (76.5 in)
- Height: 1,284 mm (50.6 in)
- Curb weight: 1,258 kg (2,773 lb)

The Alfa Romeo Pandion is a concept car which premiered at the 2010 Geneva Motor Show. It was designed by Stile Bertone and the main responsibility was given to Mike Robinson. The Pandion coupé was designed as a tribute to Alfa Romeo's centennial anniversary. The Pandion is based on the Alfa Romeo 8C Competizione sports car and shares its all-aluminium 4.7-litre (4691 cc) (286.8 cu in) DOHC 90 degree V8 engine, rated at 450 PS (331 kW; 444 hp). The kerb weight is 1,258 kg (2,773 lb).

The Pandion can attain a theoretical top speed of 320 km/h (199 mph) and can accelerate from 0 to 100 km/h (62 mph) in 3.9 seconds.

The most eye catching feature of the car is its doors, they open by rotating backwards, opening full 90 degree upward, the whole side of the car is one door from the front fender to the rear fender. Earlier Bertone has made other similar door designs, like in the 1968 Alfa Romeo Carabo and the 1970 Lancia Stratos 0.

Other notable design feature can be found on the rear of the car, which has a striking array of crystal-like blades.

Its very thin seats are the first to contain integrated illumination due to a new fabric lightbulb.

== Gallery ==
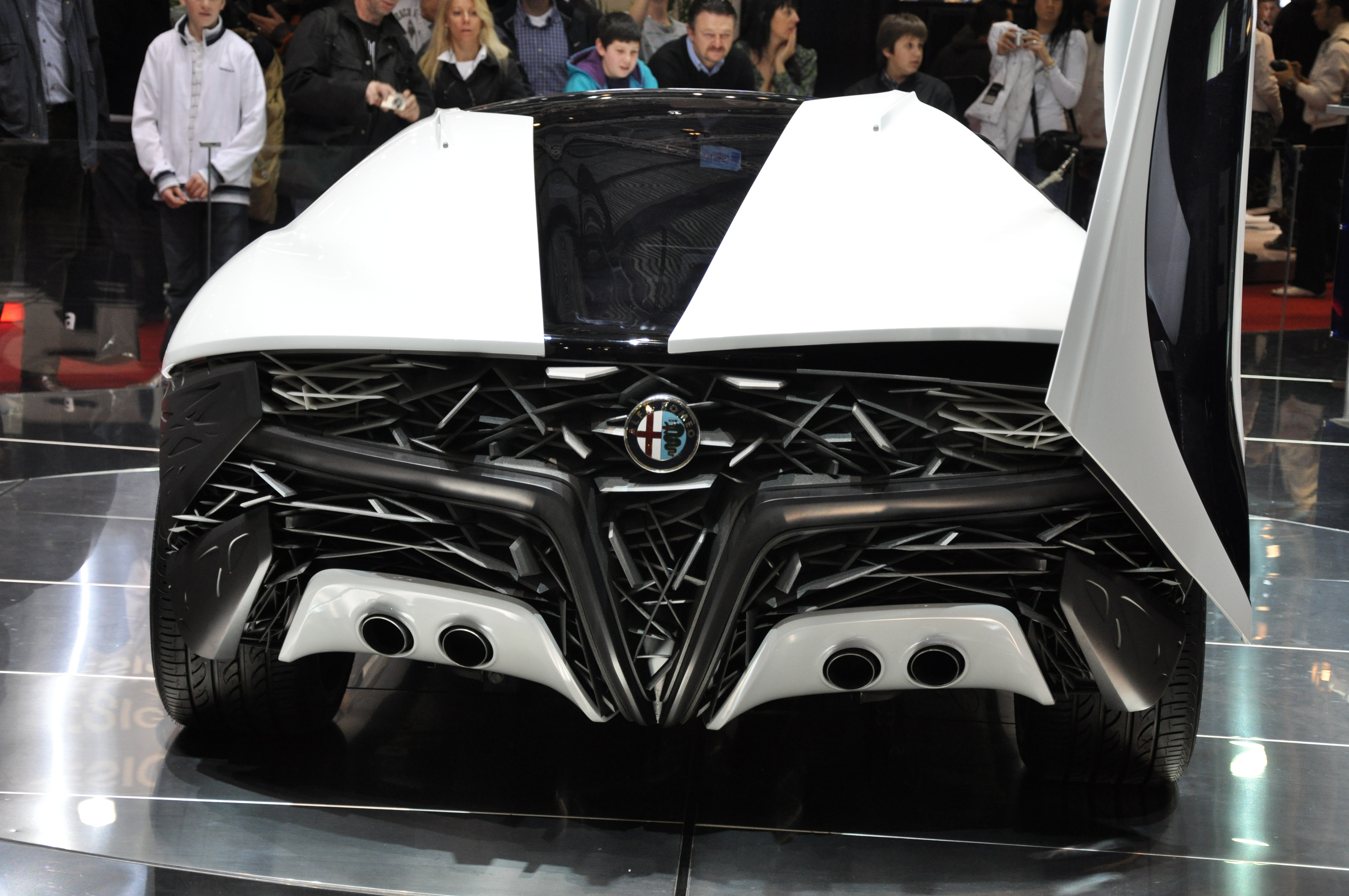
Rear view

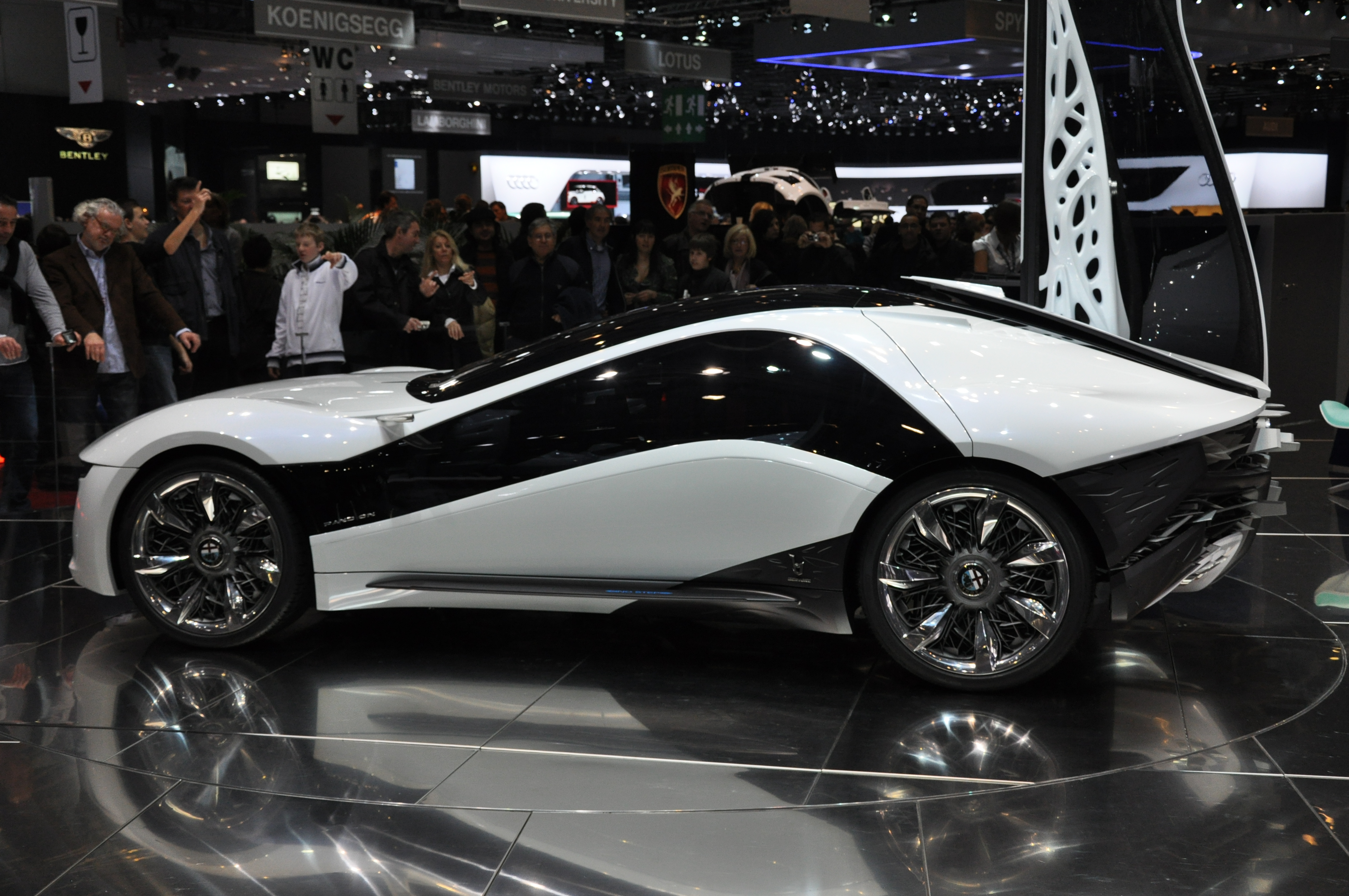
Side view
