= Lancia Dialogos =

Concept car developed by Lancia

Lancia Diàlogos
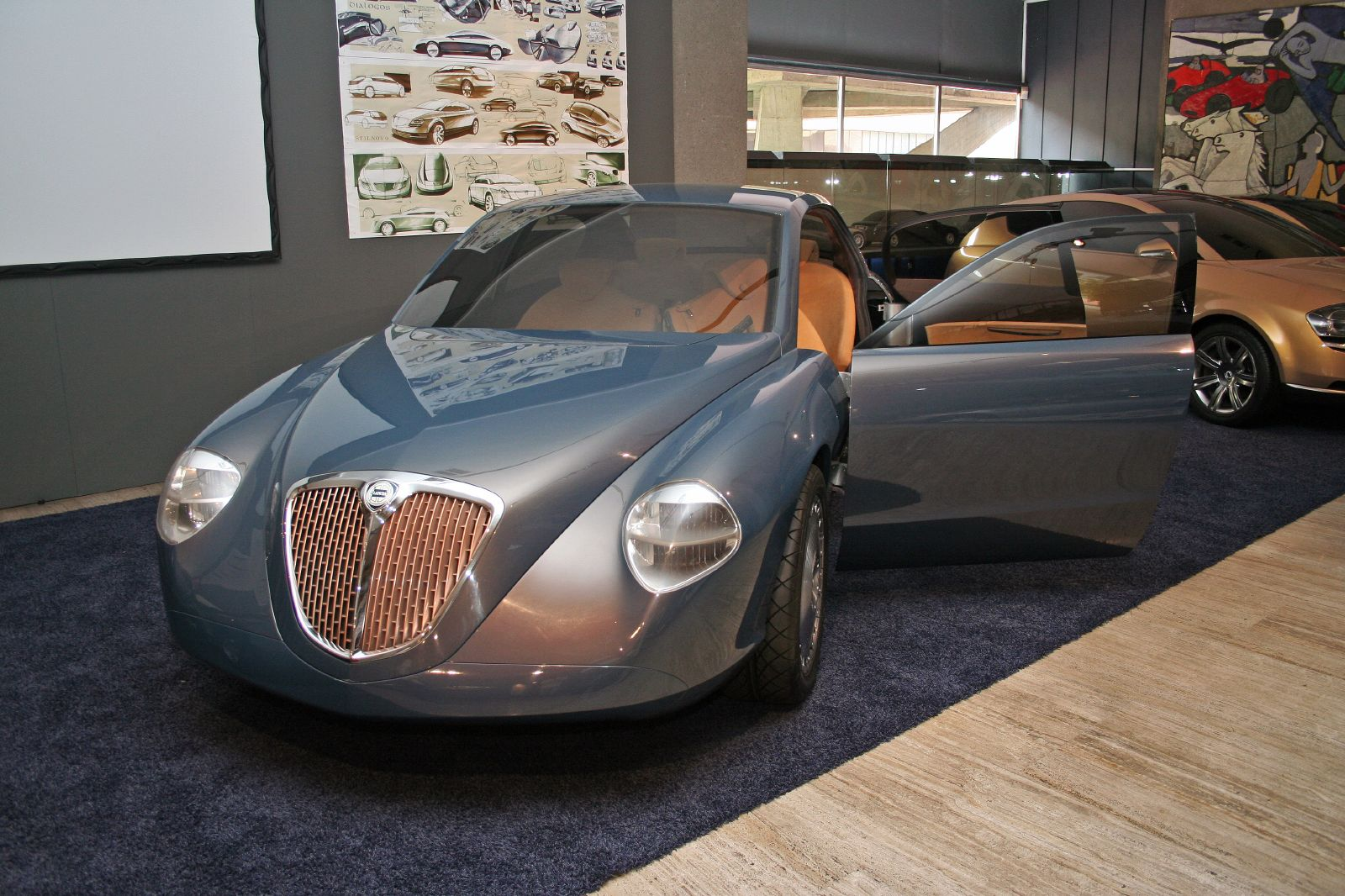

Overview
- Manufacturer: Lancia
- Production: 1998 (concept)
- Designer: Centro Stile Lancia: Pietro Camardella; Marco Tencone; Mike Robinson; Flavio Manzoni (interior)

Body and chassis
- Body style: 4-door sedan
- Related: Lancia Thesis

Dimensions
- Wheelbase: 3.05 m (120.1 in)
- Length: 4.99 m (196.5 in)
- Width: 1.95 m (76.8 in)
- Height: 1.49 m (58.7 in)

The Lancia Diàlogos is an Italian luxury concept car that was presented in saloon form at the 1998 Turin Motor Show.

By European standards, the Diàlogos is a significantly large car with a 1.95 m (76.8 in) width, 1.49 m (58.7 in) height and standard wheelbase of 3.05 m (120.1 in), as a result of its interior designed to combine the concepts of a perfect atmosphere, a living room, and stress-free driving.

Under development since August 1996, the Diàlogos was designed by the company's in-house Centro Stile Lancia under chief designer, Mike Robinson, who described the concept as "a futuristic design, a next-generation car, with a flavor of the past". Distinctive body features include front styling dominated by a large grille, and the absence of side central pillars with the rear doors opening backwards, to evoke the design of the Lancia Aurelia saloon of the 1950s.

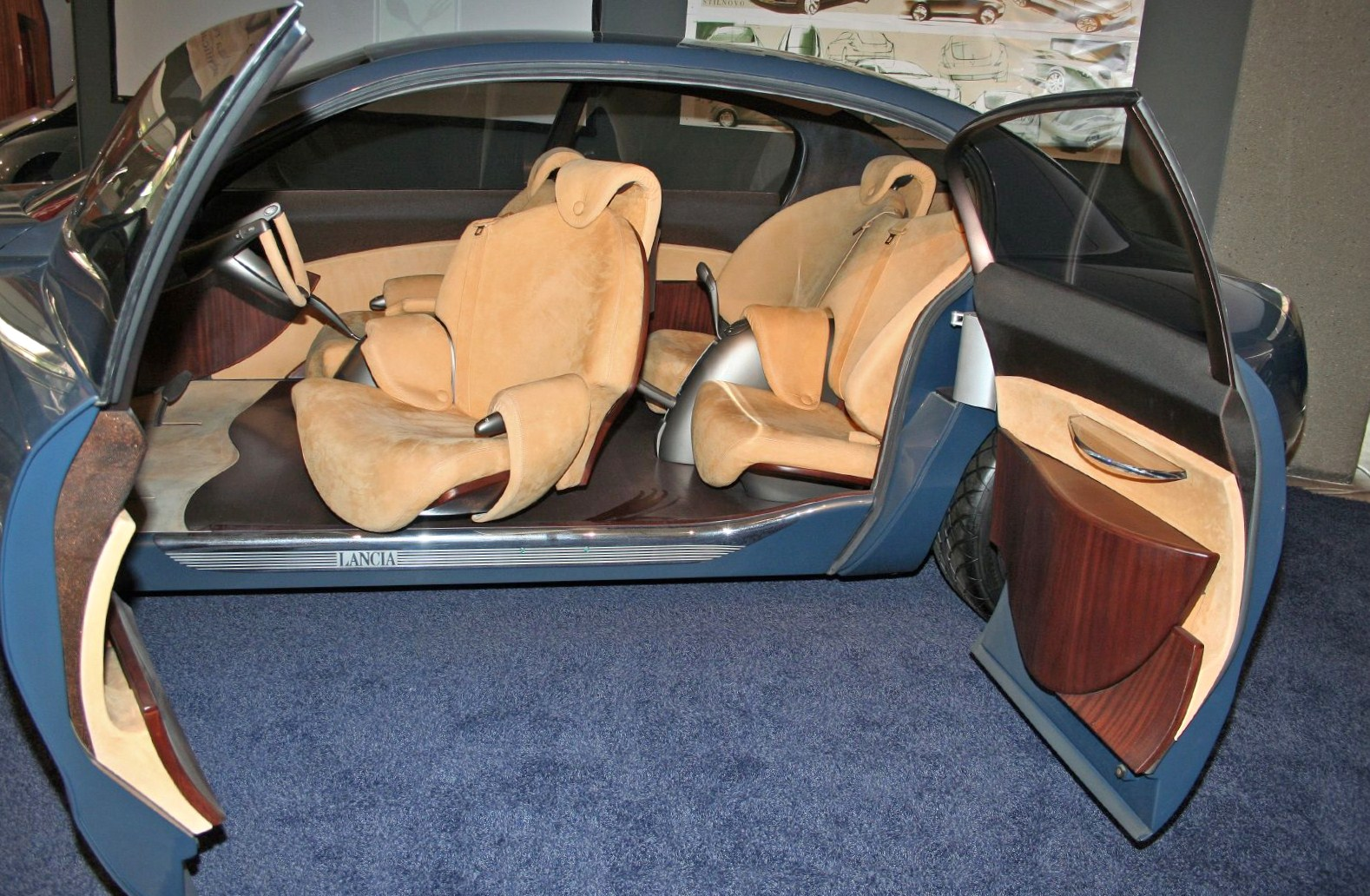
Diàlogos interior

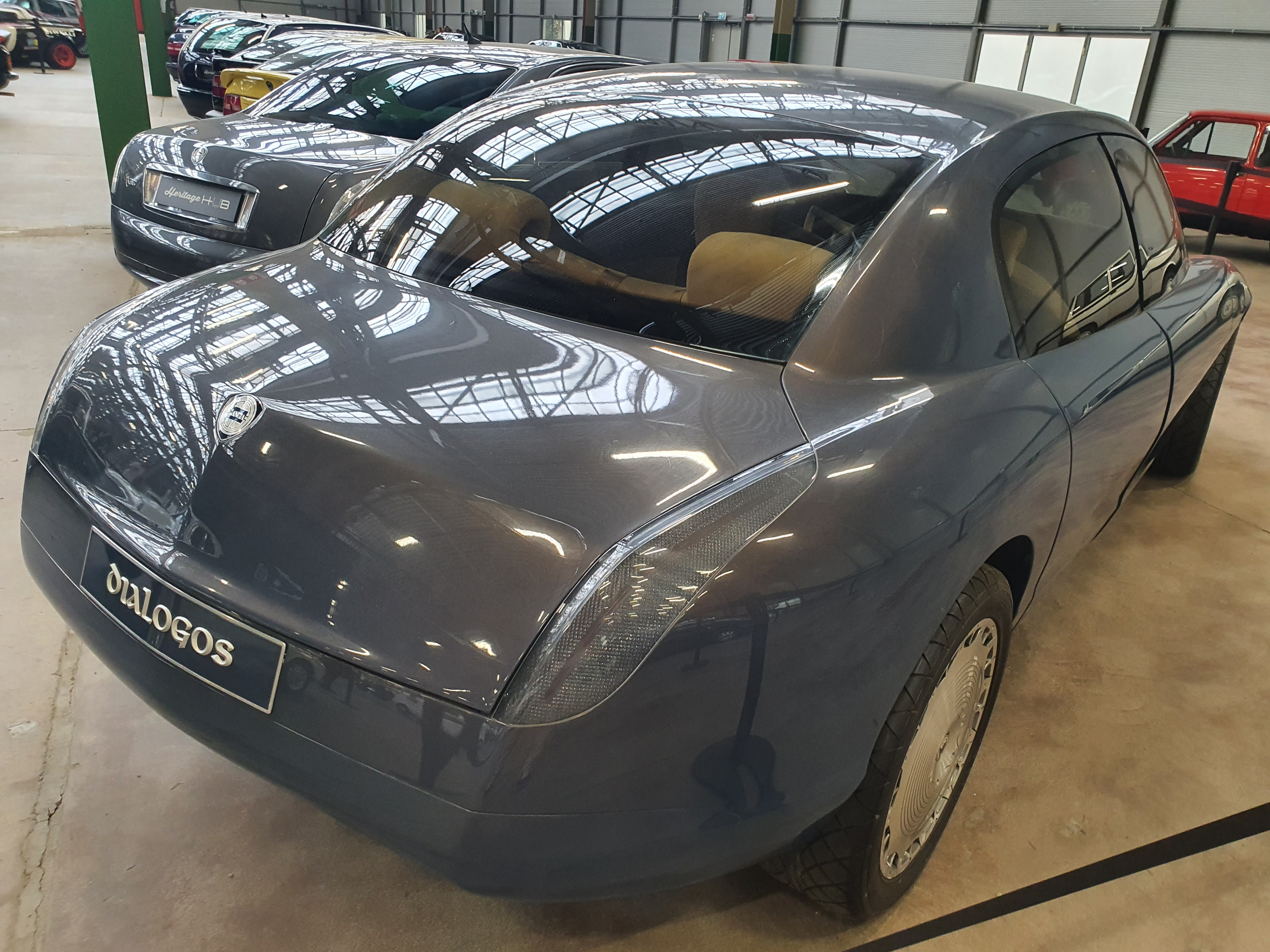
Diàlogos rear

The interior is sumptuously appointed with body-moulding seats trimmed in "nabuk", said to be similar to chamois leather. In addition, the front seats of the Diàlogos swivel through 90° to help access into the cabin, and by 180° to form a sofa facing the rear seats. Other interior features include: a steering wheel and instrument panel located at the centre for ease of access but that can slide on either side depending on the prevailing driving direction; 2 screens fitted in the back of the front seats; a tactile thin film of softwood bonded to a layer of resin and foam for the dashboard and some other areas; a personal electronic key, known as the "Ego Card", which allows the car to adapt to an individual's needs associated with seat position, multi-zone climate control settings, steering-wheel and pedal position; automatically opening driver's door upon approaching the car.

Mechanically, although not equipped with an engine, the Diàlogos is said to feature an active differential and adjustable drive-torque distribution to both axles as well as multilink suspension. For example, the front suspension uses a virtual steering axis, with the said axis passing through the center of the front wheels thus claimed to result in potholes or uneven surfaces not causing the wheel to vibrate or turn. The rear suspension too uses a virtual pitch center such that, when riding over an obstacle, the wheel moves back to reduce interference transmitted to the body.

In terms of driving technologies the Diàlogos has: fully adaptive headlights that respond to driving conditions; adaptive cruise control; adaptive semi-automatic transmission; anti-collision and lane departure systems; voice control for many systems; exterior cameras.

Lancia later adapted and introduced many of the above technologies for mass production on its Lancia Thesis saloon, which was launched in 2001 and whose exterior styling was based on that of the Diàlogos.

Although a wagon concept was also designed, it was never produced to full scale.

== Lancia Giubileo ==
In 2000, a one-off version named Giubileo was built and gifted to Pope John Paul II as part of the Catholic church's Great Jubilee celebrations. It was powered by a 3.0L Alfa Romeo V6 engine and was valued at US$1.5 million.
