= Jaguar B99 =

Concept car designed by Bertone

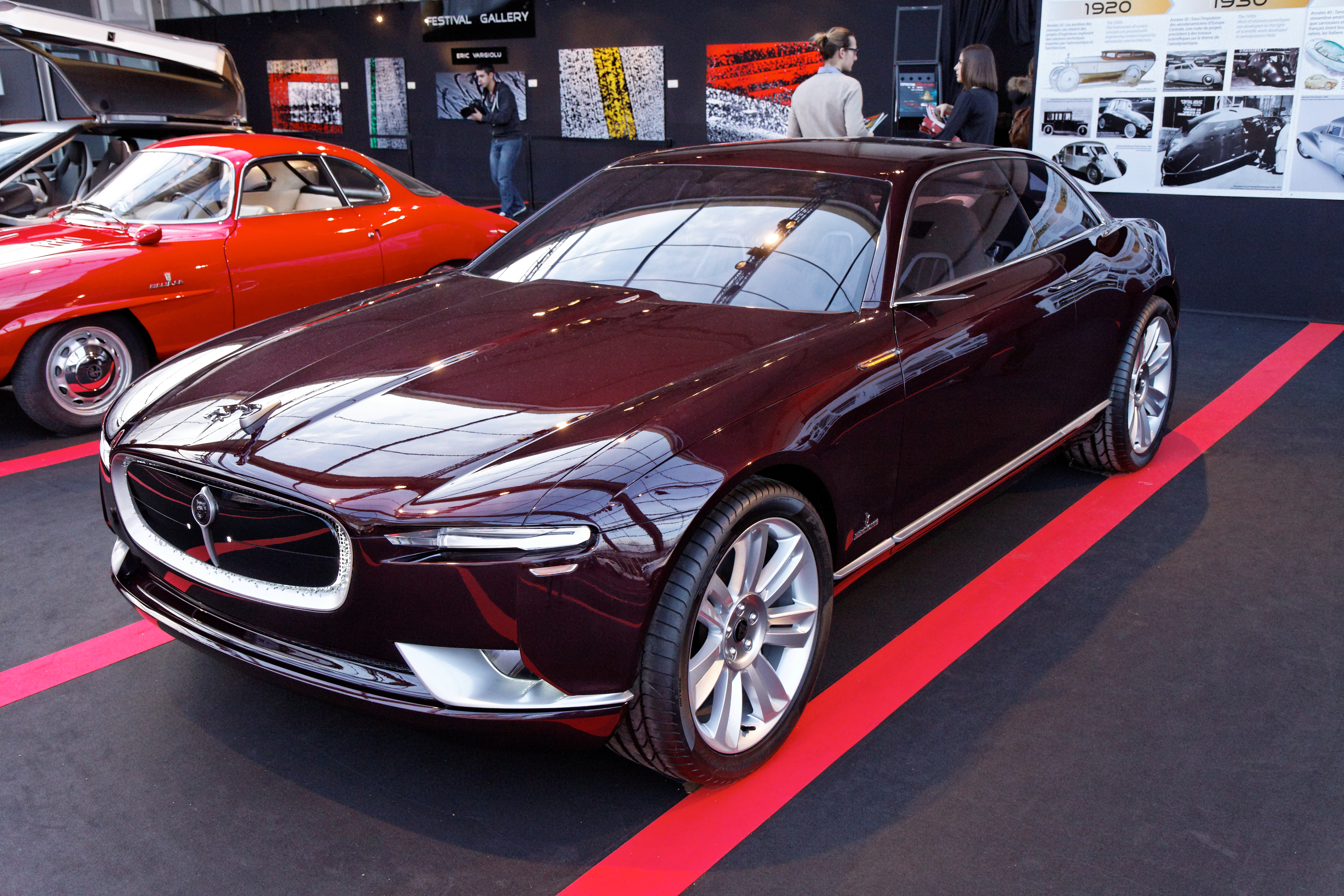
- The Jaguar B99 at the Festival Automobile International 2012

Overview
- Manufacturer: Gruppo Bertone
- Also called: Jaguar B99 GT
- Production: 2011 (Concept car)
- Designer: Mike Robinson, Adrian Griffiths at Bertone

Body and chassis
- Class: Compact executive car (D) (B99); Grand tourer (S) (B99 GT)
- Body style: 4-door saloon
- Layout: Front-engine, rear-wheel-drive (B99); Front-engine, all-wheel-drive (B99 GT)
- Doors: Conventional doors (front); Coach Doors (rear)

Powertrain
- Engine: 1.4 L FCA MultiAir Turbo I4
- Electric motor: 2x AC induction/asynchronous, Permanent magnet motor (B99); 4x AC induction/asynchronous, Permanent magnet motor (B99 GT)
- Hybrid drivetrain: Series Hybrid

Dimensions
- Wheelbase: 2,800 mm (110.2 in)
- Length: 4,500 mm (177.2 in)
- Width: 1,950 mm (76.8 in)
- Height: 1,350 mm (53.1 in)

The Jaguar B99 is a concept car designed and developed by the Italian design house Bertone. It was first shown to the public on the Bertone stand at the 2011 Geneva Motor Show. The 4-door saloon was shown in two versions: compact executive (B99) and grand tourer (B99 GT). It was designed by Bertone's Michael Robinson and Adrian Griffiths and was based more on traditional Jaguars of the Geoff Lawson era compared to more recent Jaguars designed by Ian Callum.

== B99 ==
The B99 was a 4,500 mm (177.2 in) long 4-door saloon with 4 seats constructed of aluminium panels and featured suicide doors. It was only 1,350 mm (53.1 in) high and 1,950 mm (76.8 in) wide and stood on a 2,800 mm (110.2 in) wheelbase.

The power train was also developed by Bertone as a hybrid; featuring a 1.4 L engine for range extension purposes with two electric motors of 201 bhp (150 kW; 204 PS) each driving the rear wheels. The car's maximum output of engine and electric motors is 570 bhp (425 kW; 578 PS). Average CO_{2} emissions were estimated at 30g/km with a claimed 60 mile range electric-only mode.

The B99 name stands for B for Bertone and 99 for Bertone's 99th year in operation.

== B99 GT ==
The GT2 racing version was called the Jaguar B99 GT and is 500 mm (19.7 in) wider than the standard car and is 100 mm (3.9 in) lower, while the interior is stripped out and fitted with a roll cage. The GT added an additional two electric motors giving it a four-wheel drive and a total power output of 972 bhp (725 kW; 985 PS).

== Reception ==
The B99 was reported to be well received at the Geneva Motor Show unveiling and that the B99 might form the basis of a replacement for the previous Jaguar X-Type but Jaguar confirmed that they would not be asking Bertone to develop the concept. Jaguar's Global Brand Director Adrian Hallmark was quoted as saying ‘we appreciate the fact that Jaguar is interesting enough for people to do a concept around. It's not that we are offended by it, or against it - it is just not for us.’

== Gallery ==
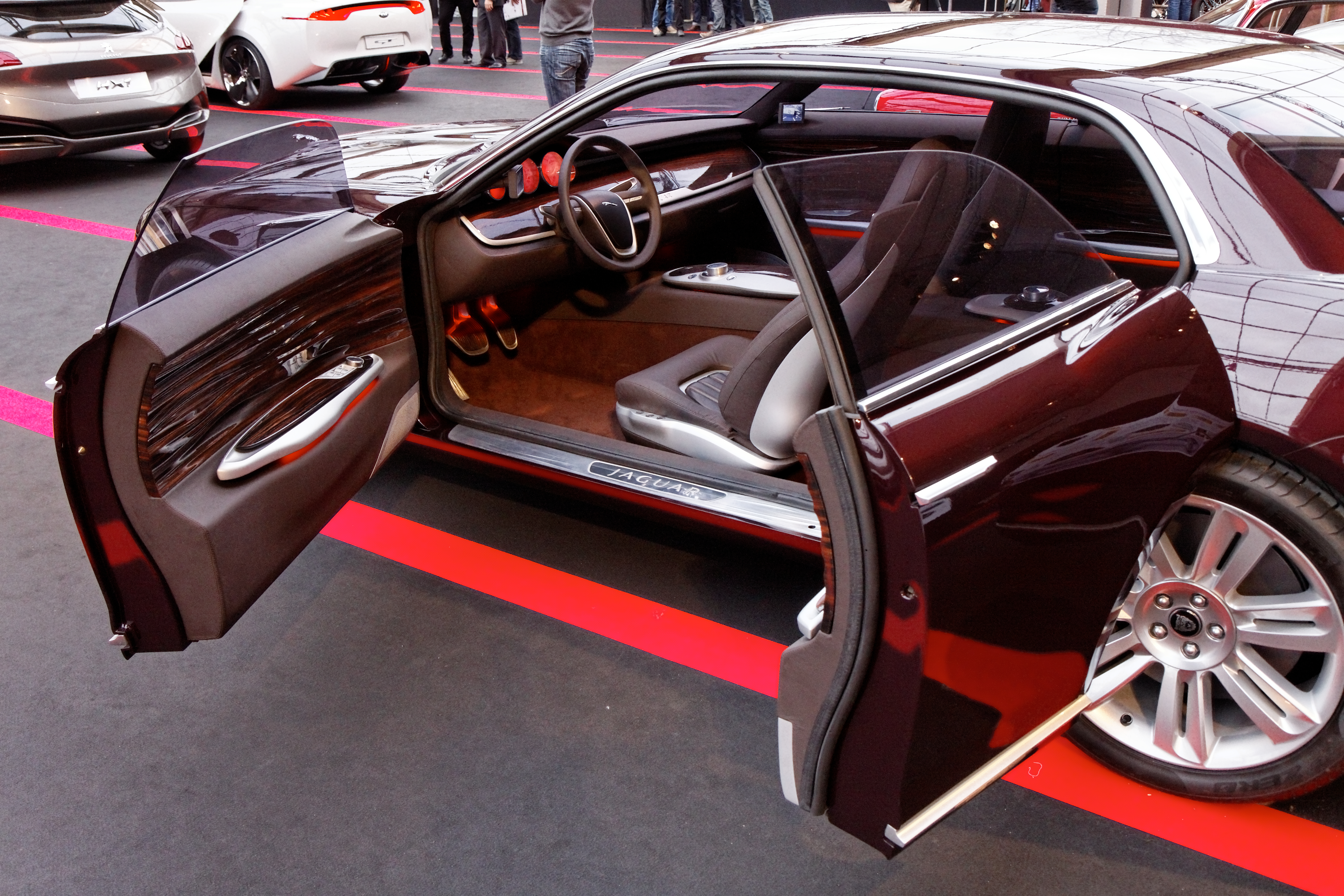
B99 doors

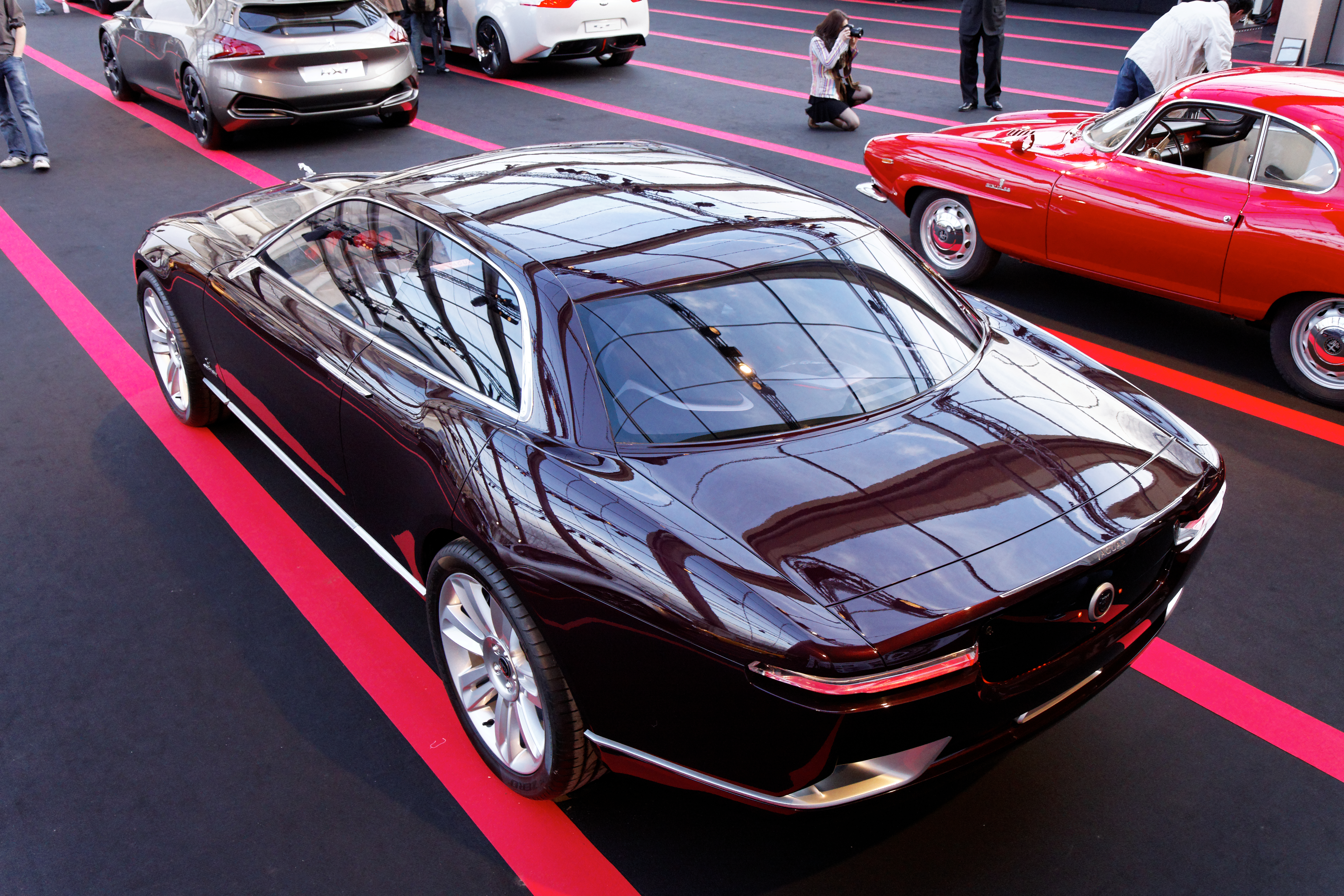
B99 rear

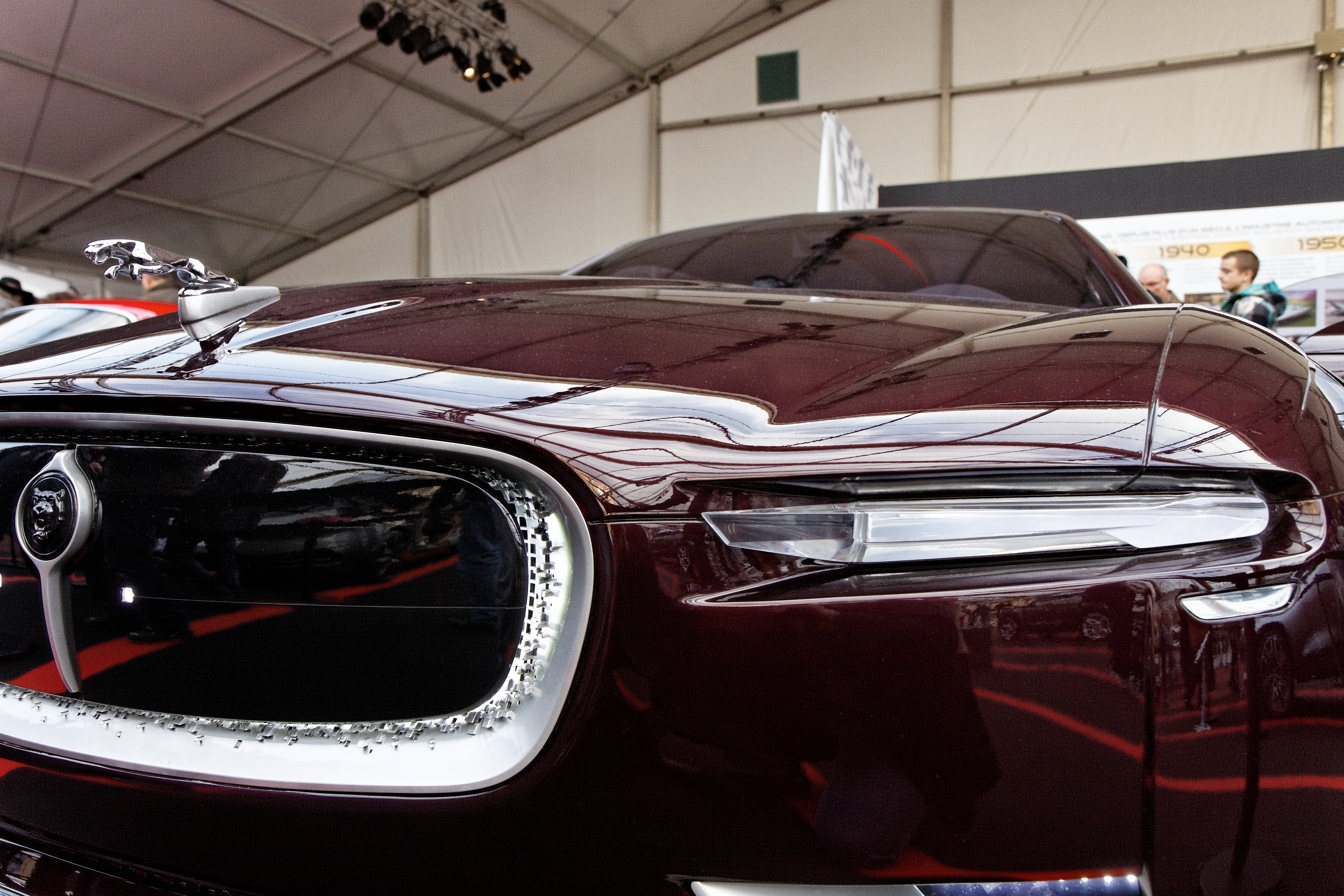
B99 front detail

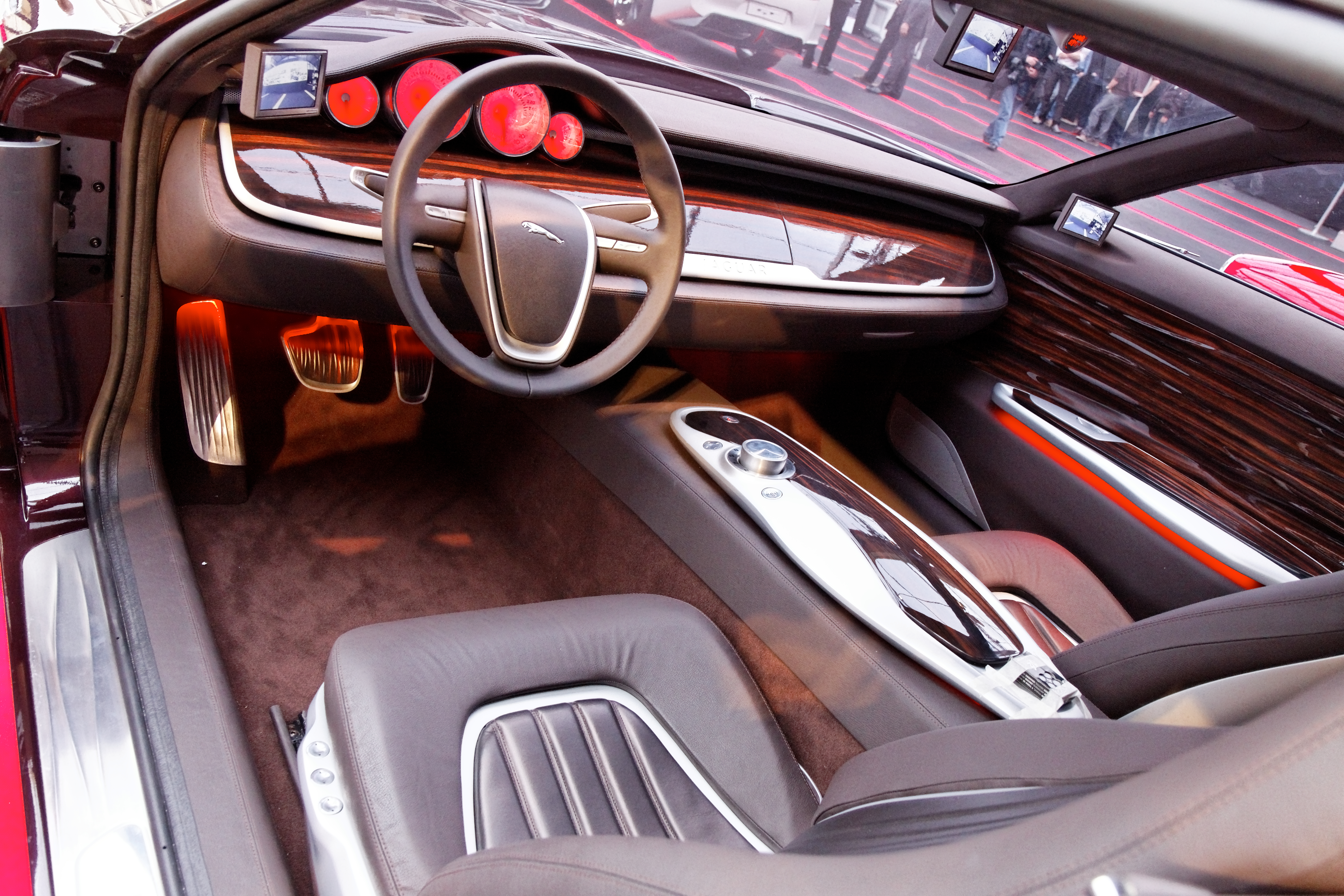
B99 interior

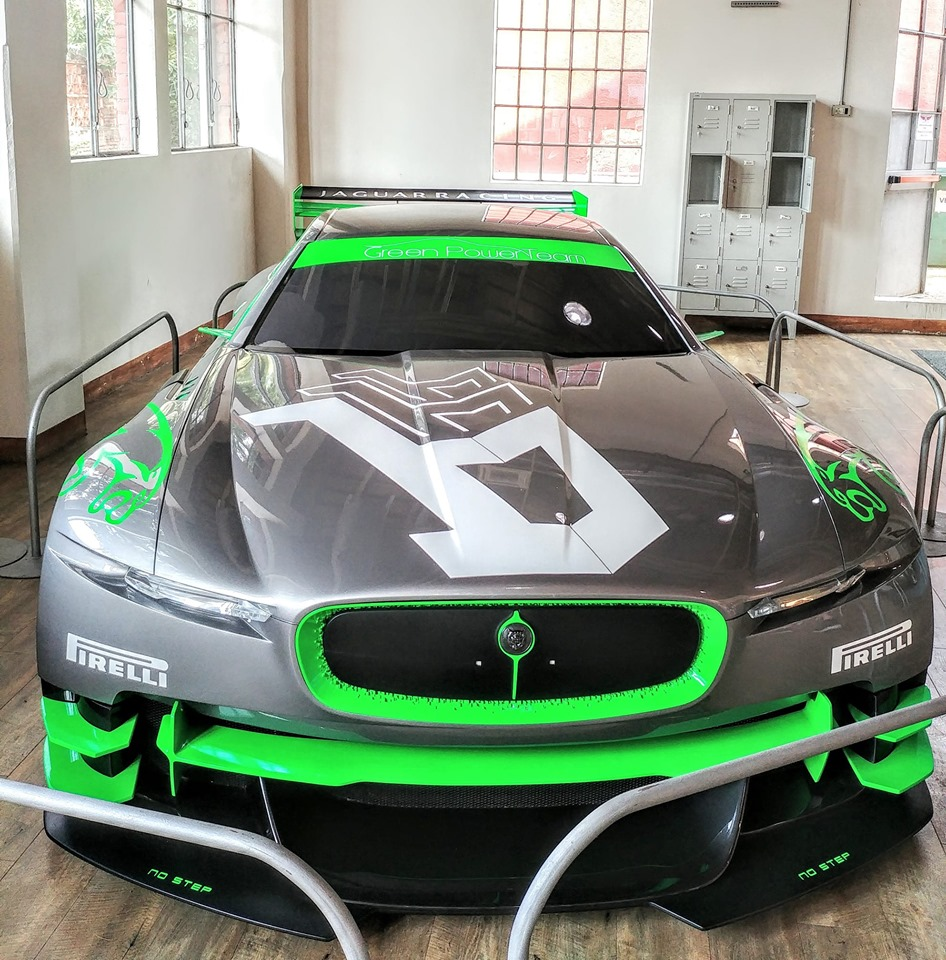
B99 GT
