= Lancia Thesis =

Full-size car (2001–2009)

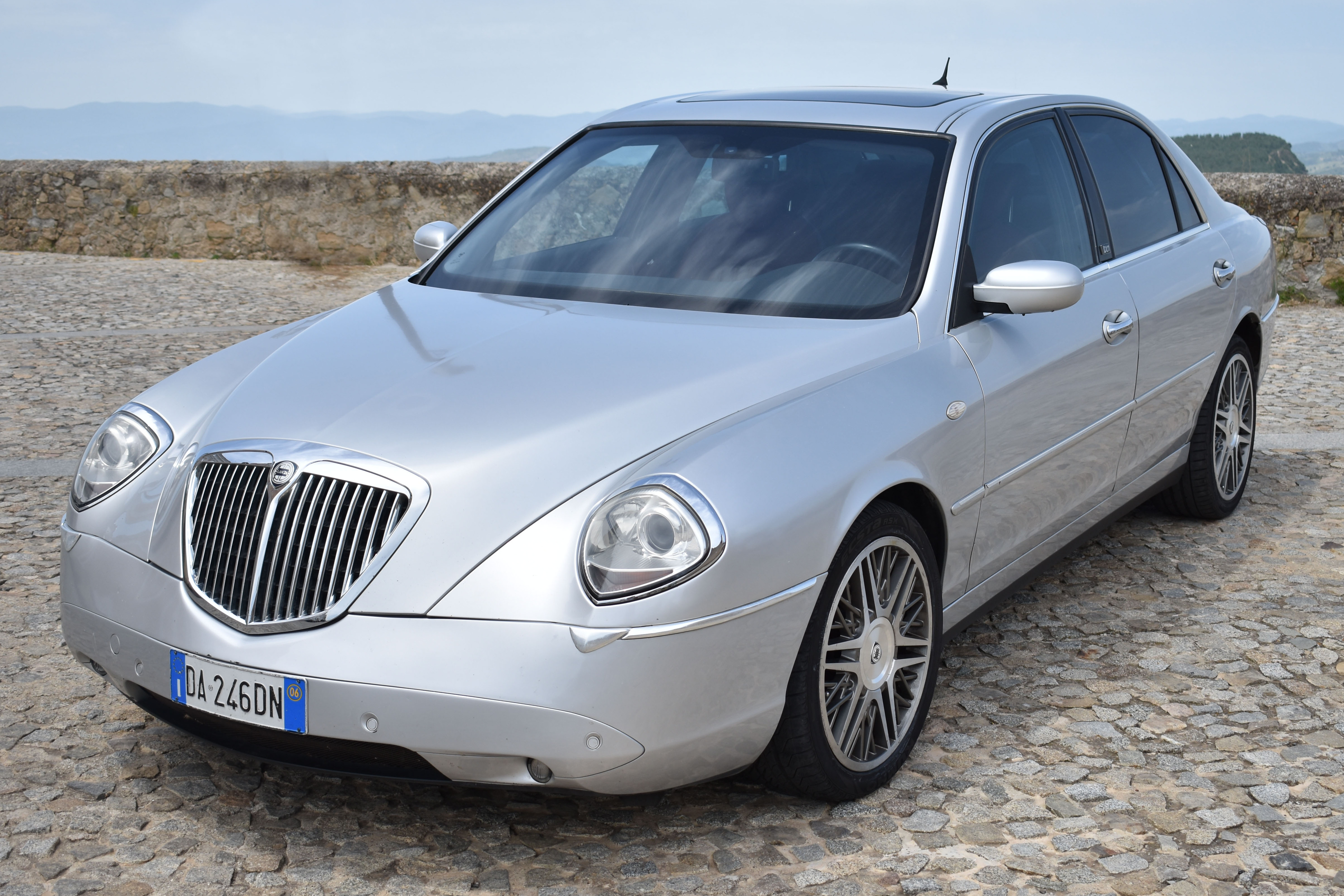
- Lancia Thesis Centenario

Overview
- Manufacturer: Fiat Auto (2001–2007); Fiat Group Automobiles (2007–2009)
- Production: 2001–2009
- Assembly: Italy: Turin: Rivalta plant (2001–2002); Mirafiori plant
- Designer: Centro Stile Lancia: Mike Robinson; Flavio Manzoni (interior)

Body and chassis
- Class: Full-size car (F)
- Body style: 4-door saloon
- Layout: Front-engine, front-wheel-drive

Powertrain
- Engine: Petrol: 2.0 L Fiat family C 20V turbo I5; 2.4 L Fiat family C 20V I5; 3.0 L Alfa Romeo 24V V6; 3.2 L Alfa Romeo 24V V6; Diesel: 2.4 L JTD 20V I5
- Transmission: 5-speed automatic; 6-speed manual

Dimensions
- Wheelbase: 2,800 mm (110.2 in)
- Length: 4,890 mm (192.5 in)
- Width: 1,830 mm (72.0 in)
- Height: 1,470 mm (57.9 in)
- Curb weight: 1680–1895 kg (3703–4177 lb)

Chronology
- Predecessor: Lancia Kappa
- Successor: Lancia Thema II

The Lancia Thesis (Type 841) is a full-size car produced by Italian automaker Lancia between 2001 and 2009. It was available with naturally aspirated and turbocharged engines ranging between 2.0 and 3.2 litres in both straight-5 or V6 configurations. The design was based on the Lancia Diàlogos concept car unveiled in 1998. The production car premiered at the 2001 Geneva Motor Show and its interior was displayed for the first time at the Frankfurt Motor Show that same year. Sales started in June 2002 in Italy, with export markets following shortly after.

== History ==
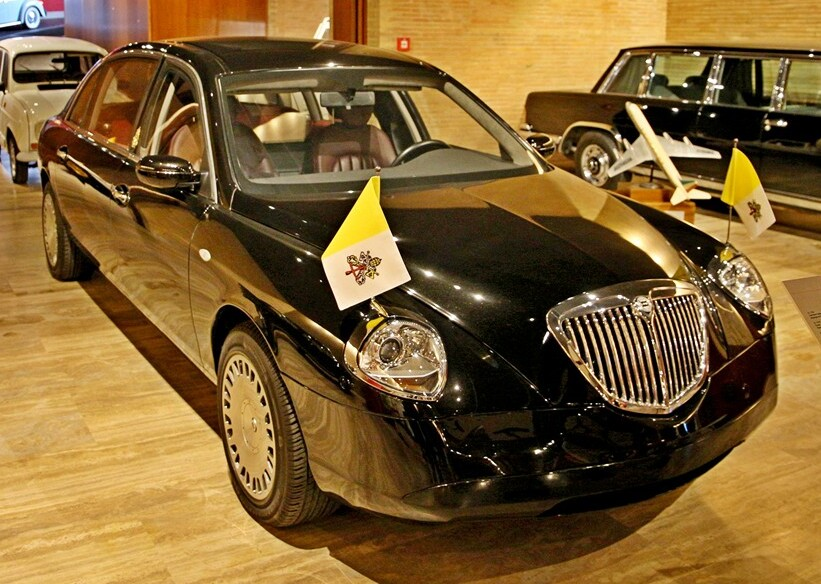
Lancia Giubileo

The earliest prototype of the Thesis, called Giubileo, was used in the Great Jubilee, presented to Pope John Paul II, bearing the production version's design yet modified as a landaulet. Lancia's chief designer's remarks on the design were: "People will be looking for excuses not to buy this car. So, we wanted to be damn sure we didn't give them anything to hook onto." To that end, the car was intended to compete with the Audi A6 and Mercedes-Benz E-Class. Due to this reason, it had more luxurious features and technological advancements.

In order to attract buyers, the Thesis was priced to be 15% cheaper than the competition. In the view of motoring writer Paul Horrell of the United Kingdom's magazine Car, the shape was "controversial, but certainly regenerates an authentic Italian alternative to the po-faced approach" of the competition. He added: "Look at that extravagant front end, like a row of chrome-decorated sand dunes. The whole form is plump and carries telling details of bi-xenon headlights and multi-LED blades of tail-lamp – a comfortably fed and well-jewelled car like the folk who'll drive it."

Regarding the interior, Horrell went on to say: "The effect is redoubled within. The cabin is truly rich and walks the right side of that line in Italian style dividing the perfectly proportioned minimalism from their bling-bling rap-star Versace vulgarity." A notable feature of the interior was the use of high-quality, lightly varnished wood trim and cast magnesium for the centre console. Horrell wrote: "I can't tell you how much more satisfying it is to use a cupholder or ashtray that glides out of solid metal than some clacky plastic lid." After describing the engraved glassware of the instruments, which were notable for what he called their needles "floating at depth", Horrell concluded that "it felt expensive".

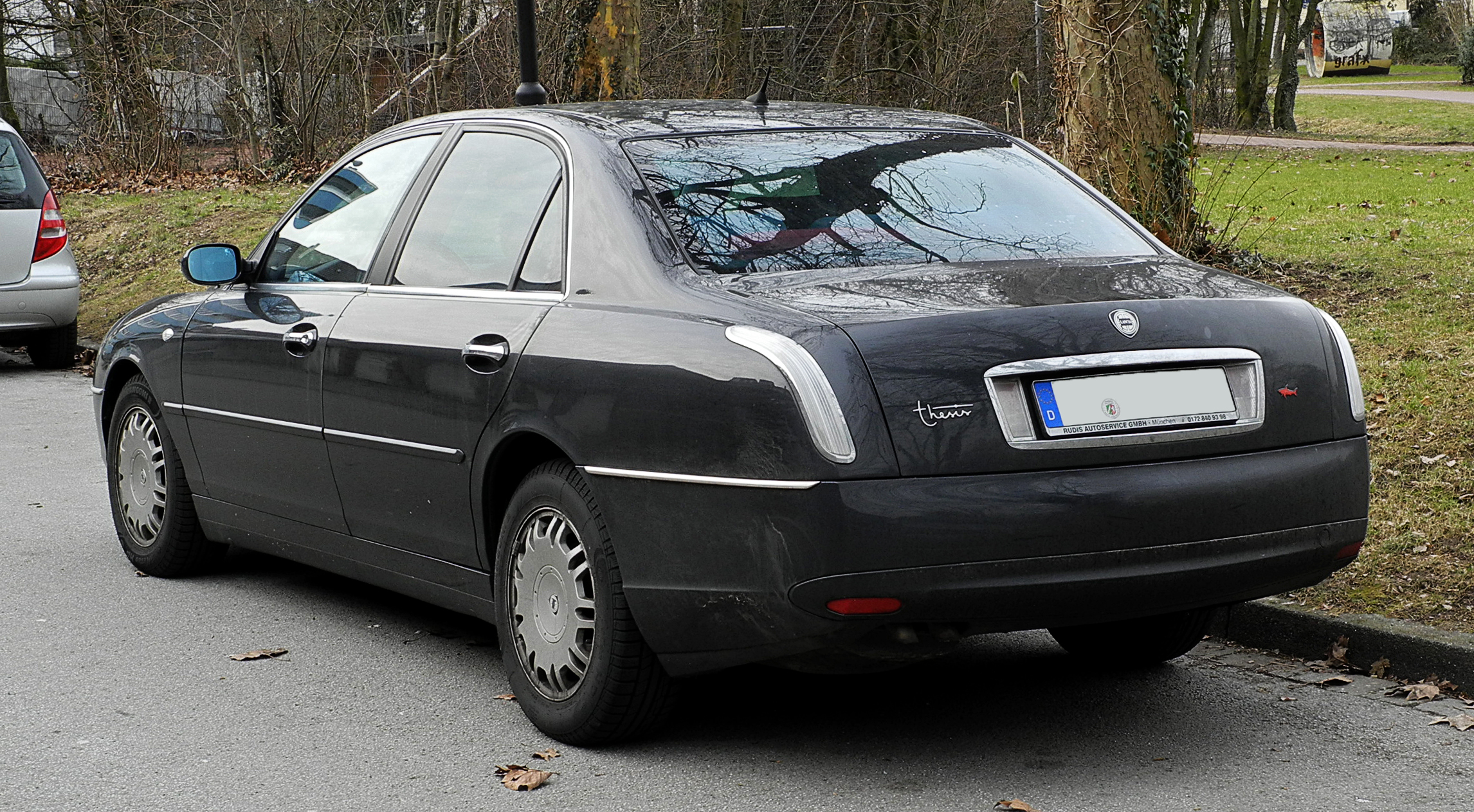
Rear view of the Thesis

Lancia invested heavily in the Thesis. Unlike its predecessor, the Kappa, which shared its platform with the Alfa Romeo 166, the Thesis was designed with its own chassis. In the words of Horrell, the car was fitted with a "complicated multi-arm aluminium-intensive suspension at both ends, augmented by Mannesmann Sachs 'Skyhook' adaptive dampers", which were used on the Maserati Spyder. It is the first Lancia automobile with radar adaptive cruise control, which was made by Bosch. The Thesis was also the first production car to introduce an electric parking brake, although the new BMW 7 Series, introduced the same year with an electric parking brake, technically beat the Thesis to production.

Describing the driving quality, Horrell wrote: "You can tell it's a heavy car, but there's no distress in letting this [test car with the V6 engine] build up a gentle sweat. Its autobox is attentive and smooth. The engine, though quieter than in any Alfa, is all you hear because road and wind noise have been quashed. Ditto rattles. This is a tight ship." He added: "The Thesis' ride is just terrific. It swallows big lumps, whatever your speed. Yet there's no heaving in distress; the adjustable dampers keep body motion in check. They're even better when the stress is lateral; considering the pillowy straight-line character, cornering roll is amazingly well-controlled."

The main criticism was the steering, which was considered by Horrell to be too light, and the slight tendency to understeer leading to intrusion of the ESP system. In conclusion, Horrell summed up the Thesis as being "far more accurate and even agile than it has any right to be." Period reviewers suggested that the car was a good product in the wrong market segment. In this view, it would have been better to offer a vehicle in the Ford Mondeo price range rather than the more conservative sector contested by the BMW 5 Series and Mercedes E-Class.

The Thesis is equipped with 6-speed manual or 5-speed automatic Comfortronic, which is available for all but 2.0 models. The interior was trimmed with leather or the suede-like Alcantara material long favoured by Lancia. The verdict of Car stated: "If Lancia can be turned around this is the car for the job." Despite its very comprehensive equipment level and the improved fit and finish, sales remained well behind its predecessor, quite far behind the competition due to reasons such as its odd looks and front-wheel drive layout. When the model was discontinued at the beginning of 2009, only 16,000 units were built. The Thesis was replaced in 2011 by a new flagship sedan, based on the Chrysler 300, rebranded in continental Europe as the Lancia Thema.

== Models ==
Model	Power	Torque	Displacement	Engine	Top speed	0–100 km/h (0–62 mph) (seconds)	Years
2.0 Turbo 20V manual	185 PS (136 kW; 182 hp) at 5,500 rpm	308 N⋅m (227 lb⋅ft) at 2,200 rpm	1,998 cc	straight-5	224 km/h (139 mph)	8.9	until 2007
2.4 20V manual	170 PS (125 kW; 168 hp) at 6,000 rpm	226 N⋅m (167 lb⋅ft) at 3,500 rpm	2,446 cc	straight-5	217 km/h (135 mph)	9.5	until 2007
2.4 20V automatic	170 PS (125 kW; 168 hp) at 6,000 rpm	226 N⋅m (167 lb⋅ft) at 3,500 rpm	2,446 cc	straight-5	215 km/h (134 mph)	10.9	until 2007
3.0 V6 24V automatic	215 PS (158 kW; 212 hp) at 6,300 rpm	263 N⋅m (194 lb⋅ft) at 5,000 rpm	2,959 cc	V6	234 km/h (145 mph)	9.2	until 2003
3.2 V6 24V automatic	230 PS (169 kW; 227 hp) at 6,200 rpm	289 N⋅m (213 lb⋅ft) at 4,800 rpm	3,179 cc	V6	240 km/h (150 mph)	8.8	until 2007
2.4 10V JTD	150 PS (110 kW; 148 hp) at 4,000 rpm	305 N⋅m (225 lb⋅ft) at 1,800 rpm	2,387 cc	straight-5	206 km/h (128 mph)	10.1	until 2005
2.4 Multijet automatic	175 PS (129 kW; 173 hp) at 4,000 rpm	330 N⋅m (243 lbf⋅ft) @2000 rpm	2,387 cc	straight-5	220 km/h (140 mph)	9.8	2003–2006
2.4 Multijet manual	175 PS (129 kW; 173 hp) at 4,000 rpm	380 N⋅m (280 lbf⋅ft) at 2,000 rpm	2,387 cc	straight-5	225 km/h (140 mph)	10.2	2003–2006
2.4 Multijet Comfortronic automatic	185 PS (136 kW; 182 hp) at 4,000 rpm	330 N⋅m (243 lbf⋅ft) at 1,750 rpm	2,387 cc	straight-5	222 km/h (138 mph)	9.7	from 2006

Fuel consumption
l/100 km	2.0 TB	2.4	2.4 Auto	3.2 V6 Auto	2.4 20v JTD Auto
Urban; Extra-urban; Combined	15.5; 8.5; 11.1	15.2; 8.4; 10.9	17.4; 8.8; 12.0	22.7; 10.3; 14.9	12.1; 6.9; 8.8
CO_{2} emissions g/km	264	260	286	355	234

== One-offs and special editions ==
=== Thesis Stola S85 ===
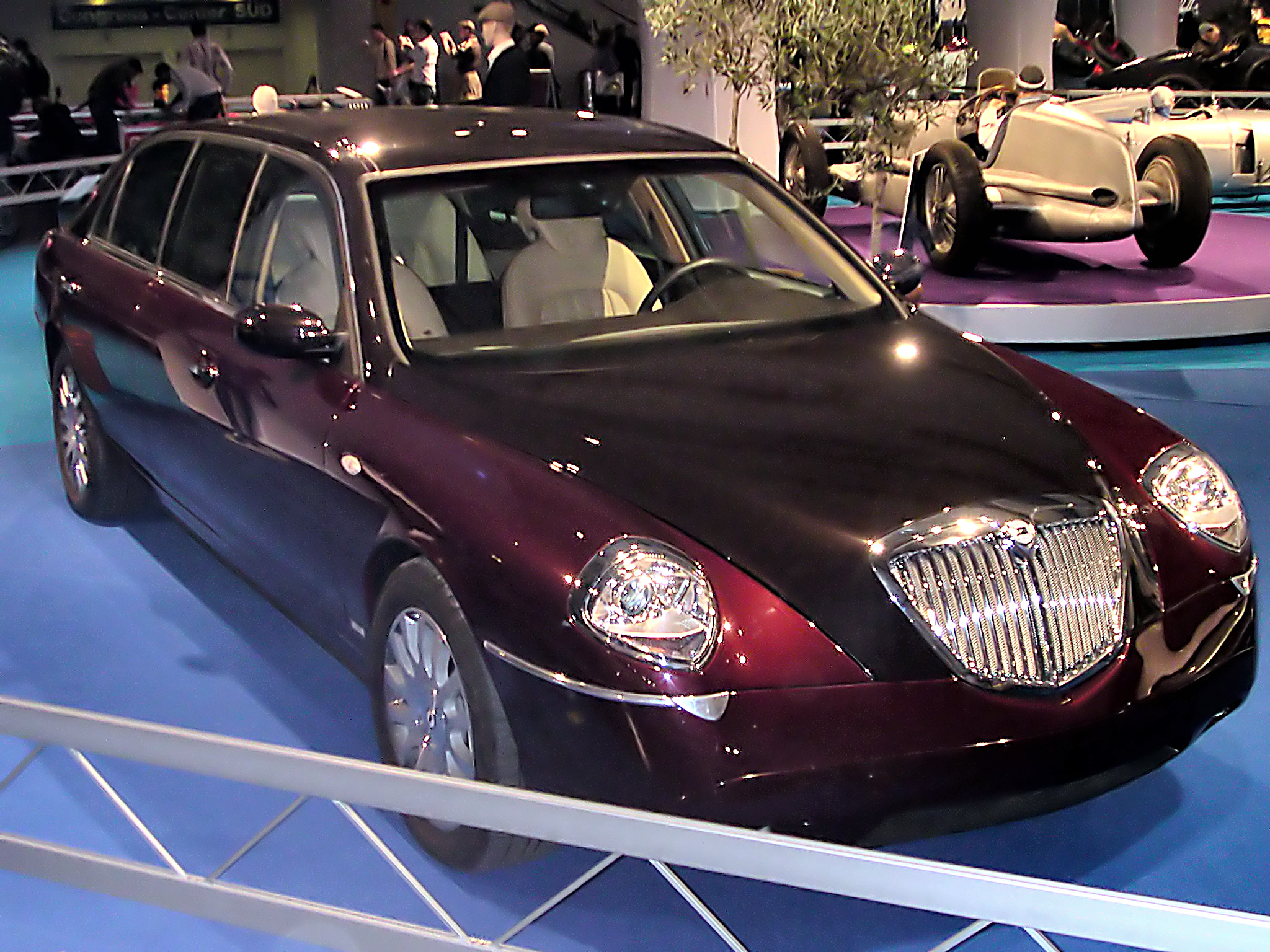
Stola S85

A 60 centimetres (24 in) stretched limousine version prototype was shown at the 2004 Geneva Motor Show having a length 5.49 m (216 in). Made by Stola, it was named as the Stola S85 to celebrate the Stola company's 85th anniversary. The car is equipped with a beige leather interior and electrically adjustable rear seats. The car also has a minibar with a refrigerator, a multimedia system with GPS navigation, internet access, fax machine, and a DVD player. With a 230 PS (169 kW; 227 hp) V6 engine and all these extra features, the converted car weighs 2,030 kg (4,475 lb), and can accelerate from 0 to 100 km/h (62 mph) in 9.2 seconds, with a top speed of 230 km/h (143 mph).
