= Mike Robinson (designer) =

American automobile designer (born 1956)

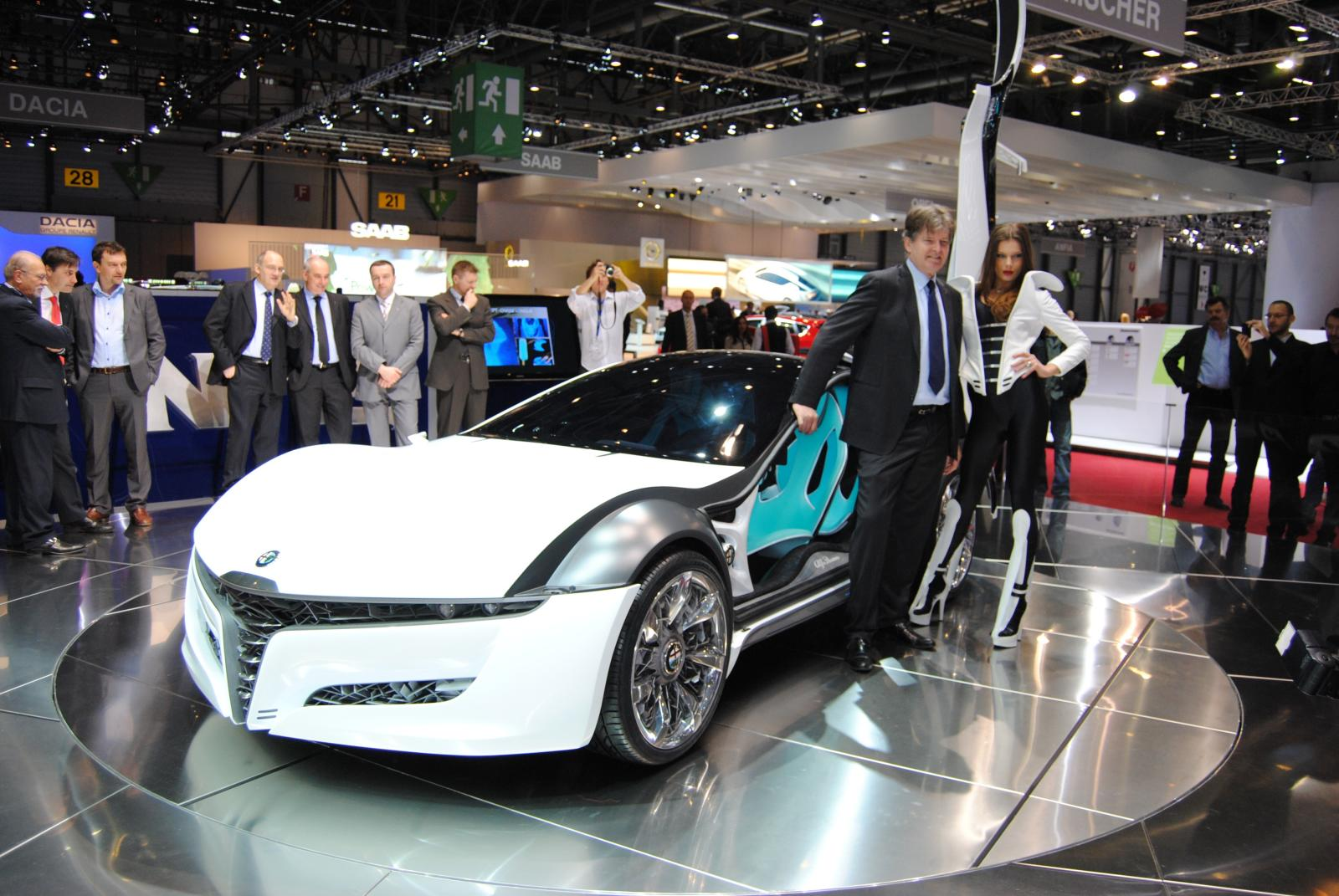
Mike Robinson at the 2010 Geneva International Motor Show near his Bertone-Alfa Romeo Pandion

Michael Vernon Robinson (born 2 May 1956) is an American automobile designer. In January 2014 he left the position of Brand and Design Director of Bertone after its financial crises, to become design director of ED Design, and then Head of Design at BLUE Engineering s.r.l. in Turin, Italy.

Previously, Robinson held the position of Design Director at Fiat and Lancia, and worked as a designer with Ford in Dearborn, Volvo in Gothenborg, Sweden, Open Design, Ghia, and Fiat in Turin, Italy. Several of his more prominent styling contributions have been the Ghia TSX-4 concept, the Fiat Bravo/Brava, Lancia Dialogos concept, Lancia Giubileo (Pope's personal limousine based on a stretch Thesis), Lancia Thesis, Lancia Nea concept, Lancia Ypsilon, Fiat Ducato, Bertone-Alfa Romeo Pandion concept, Bertone Jaguar B99 and B99 GT concepts, Bertone Nuccio concept, BAIC C51X concept, Aston Martin Jet 2 +2 one-off prototype, FAW Besturn X80 SUV, BAIC Senova D50 sedan, and BAIC Senova D60 Aero concept. In addition, Robinson designed the Project Zero for AgustaWestland. Robinson's creative team in Bertone also designed the exterior and interior of the Frecciarossa 1000, the high-speed train for Trenitalia, built by Ansaldo Breda and Bombardier.

== Background ==
Michael Vernon Robinson was born in Whittier, California, on 2 May 1956, to Don and Berta Robinson; his older brother is Douglas Robinson. At age 16, while studying architecture in high school in Kent, Washington, he discovered a poster of the Lancia Stratos Prototipo Zero by Bertone. He was so heavily influenced by the concept car that he decided to not only become a car designer but to emigrate to Turin, Italy where he felt the best car design in the world was taking place. He received bachelor's degrees in both fine arts (1978) and industrial design (1979) from the University of Washington.

When I saw that 1970 Bertone concept car a light bulb lit up in my head because it was not only the most beautiful car I had ever seen, it was also the most innovative car I had ever seen. At just 83cm tall with a cab-forward, monovolume architecture, it used the front windshield as the entry door, opening up crocodile-style, erasing all the terrible taboos tied to what was considered modern car design in America at that time. The Italians, I discovered, were light years ahead of the rest of the world in car design. So I fixed my sights on that and made it my personal mission in life. I wanted to go where the very best designers were.

== Career ==
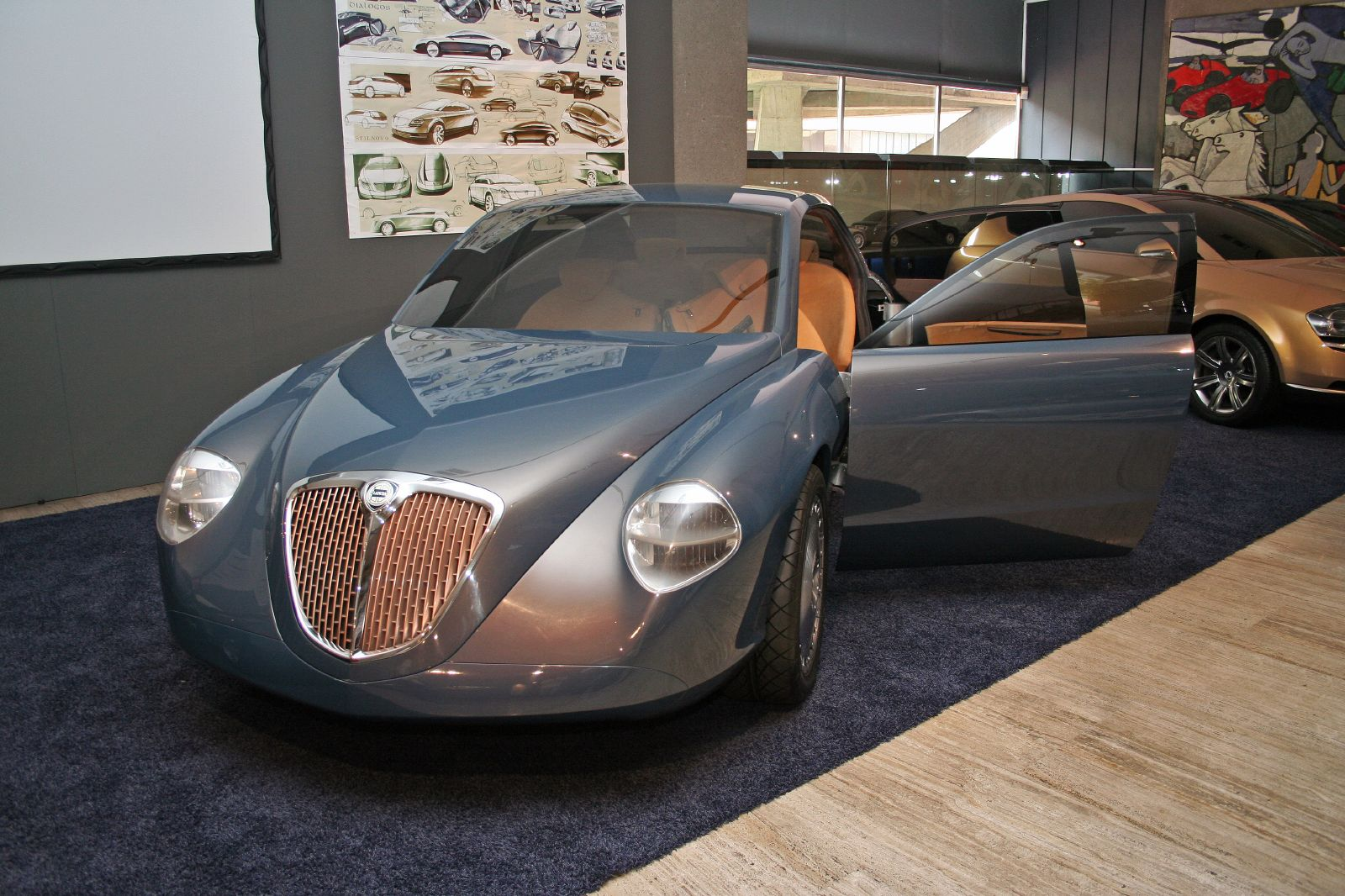
Lancia Dialogos

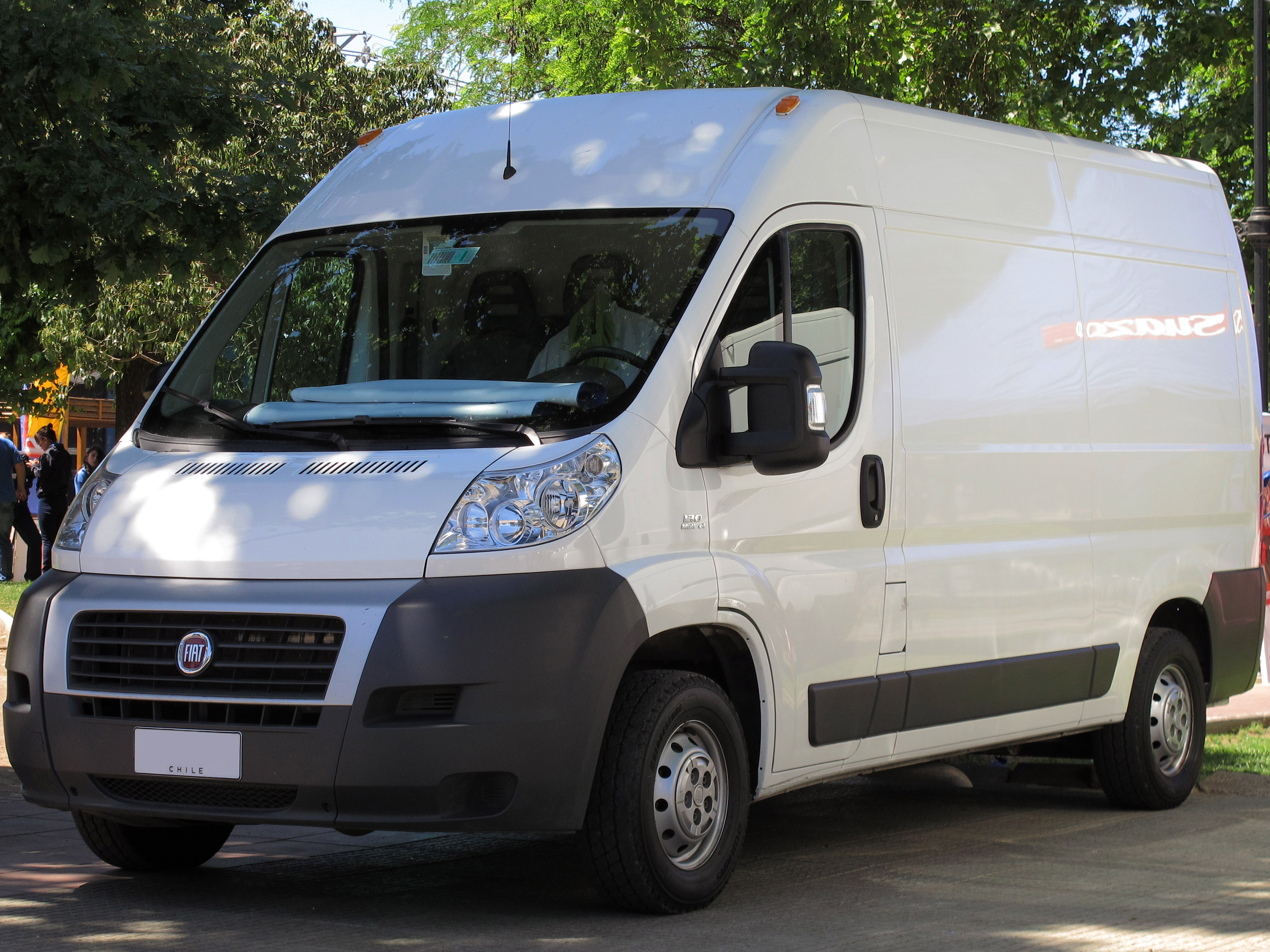
Fiat Ducato III

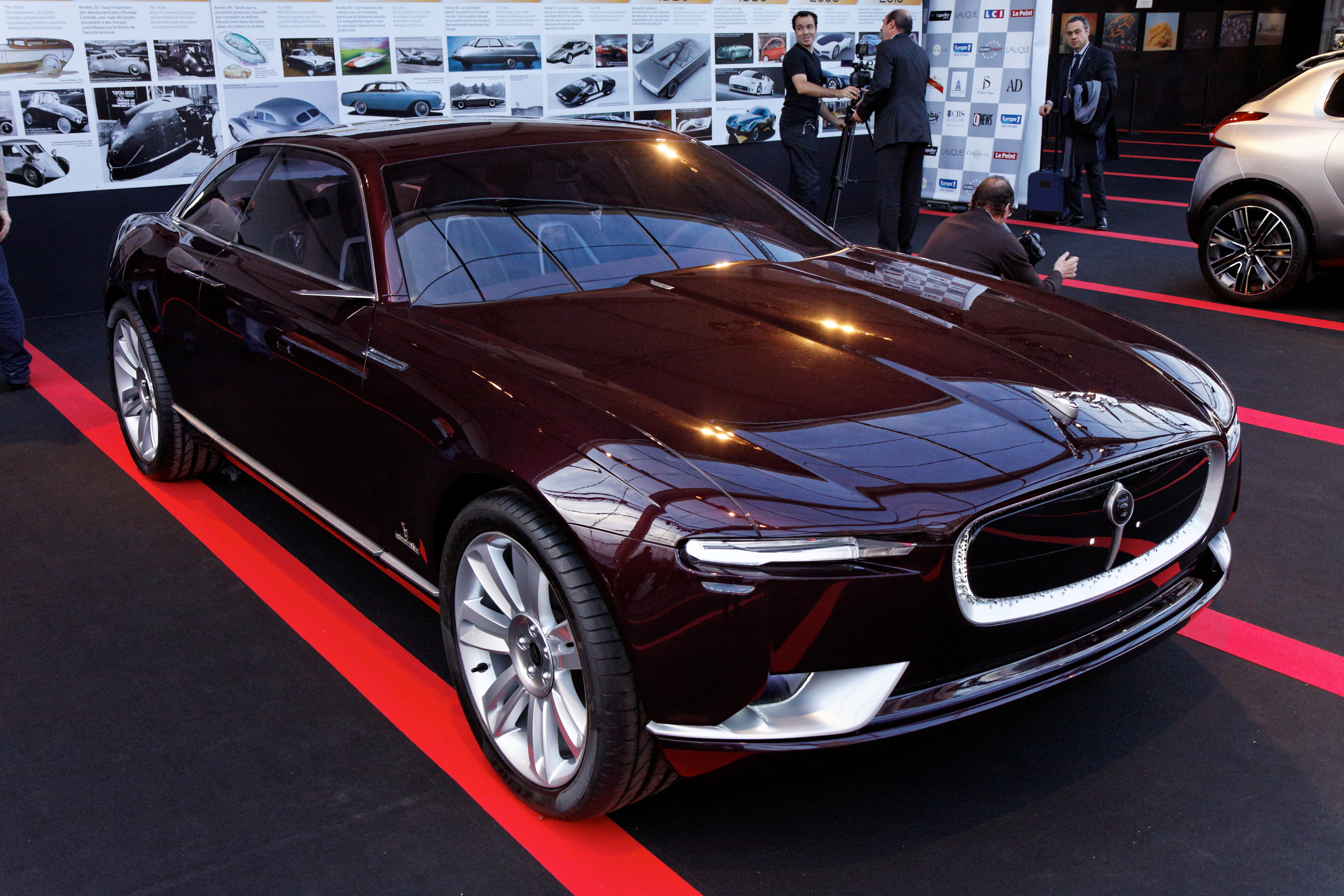
Bertone-Jaguar B99

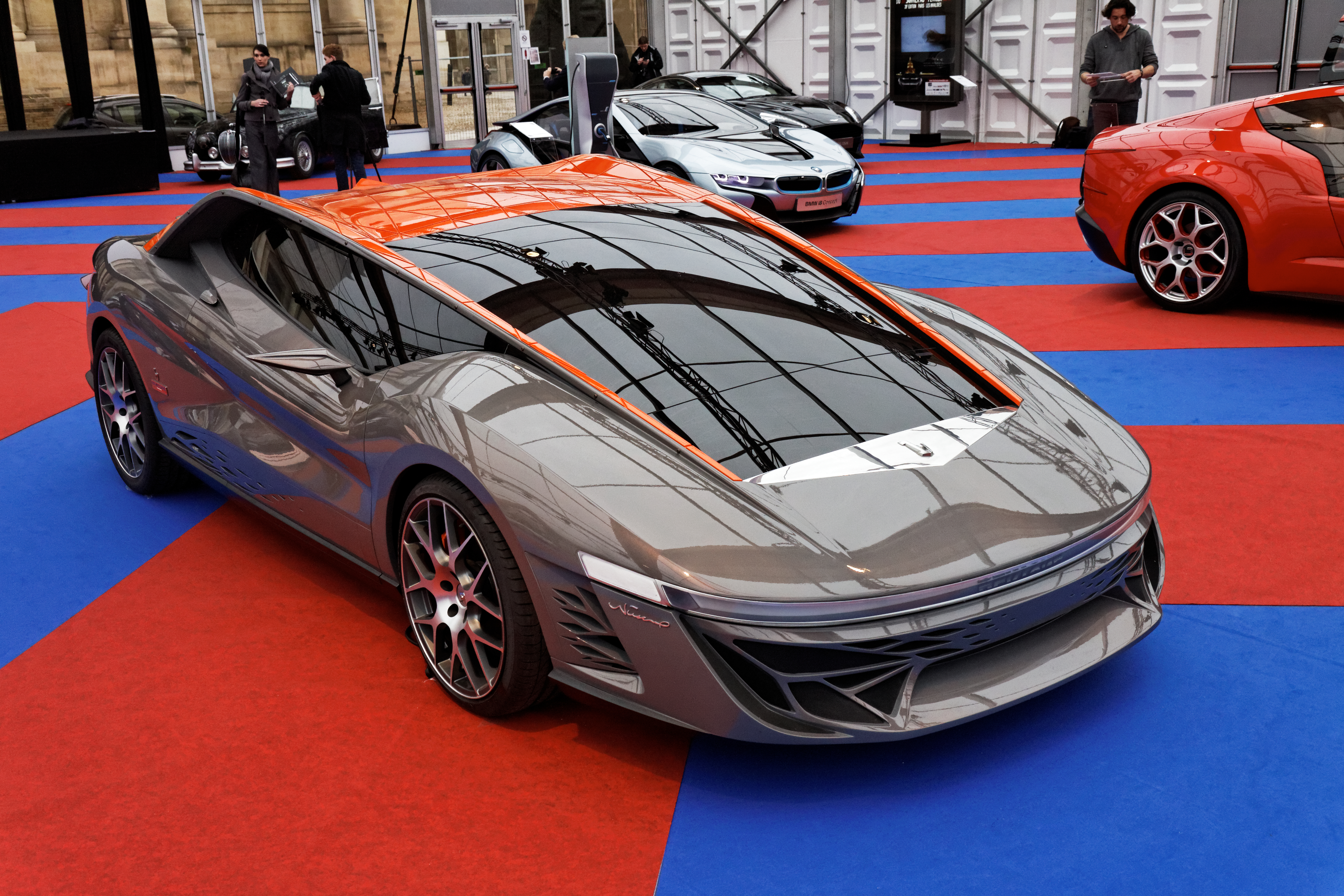
Bertone Nuccio

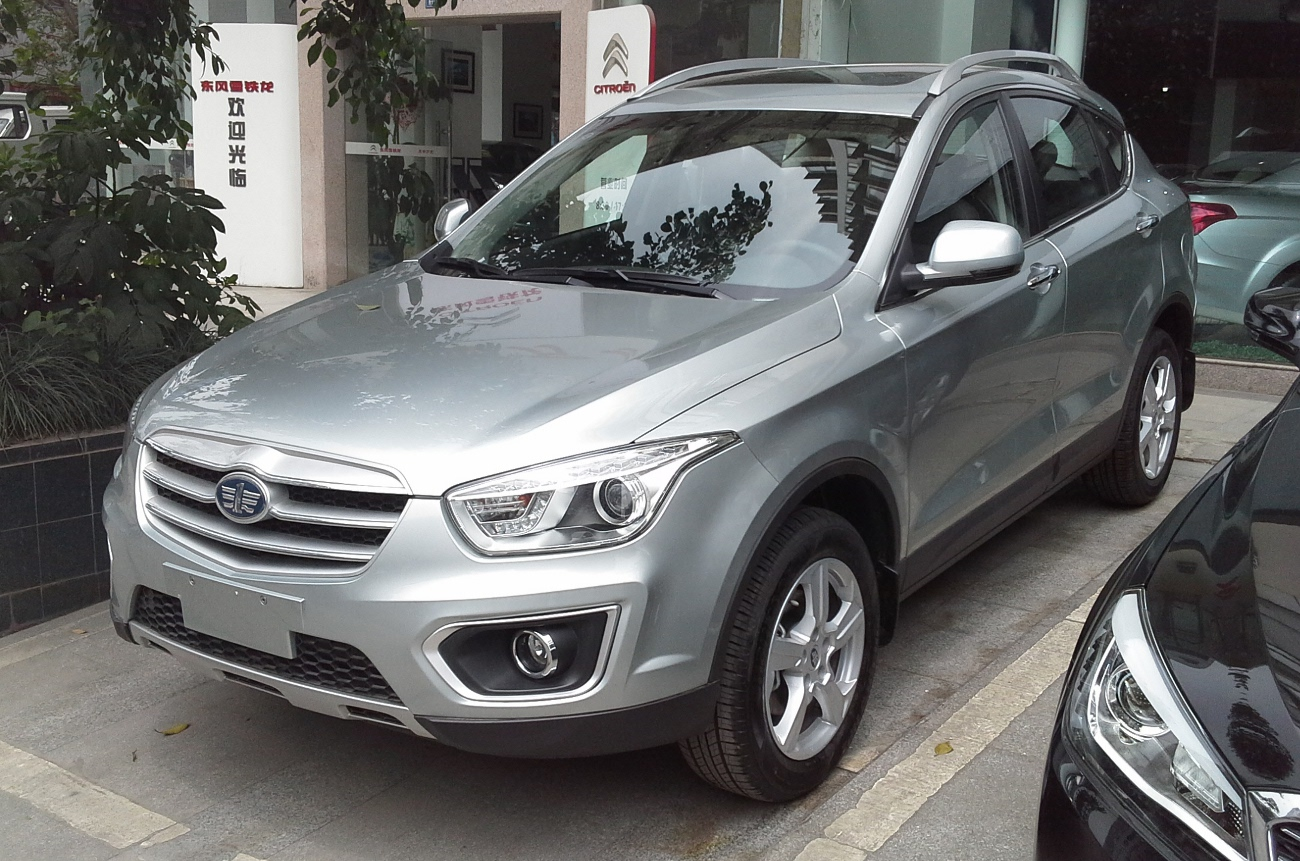
FAW Besturn X80

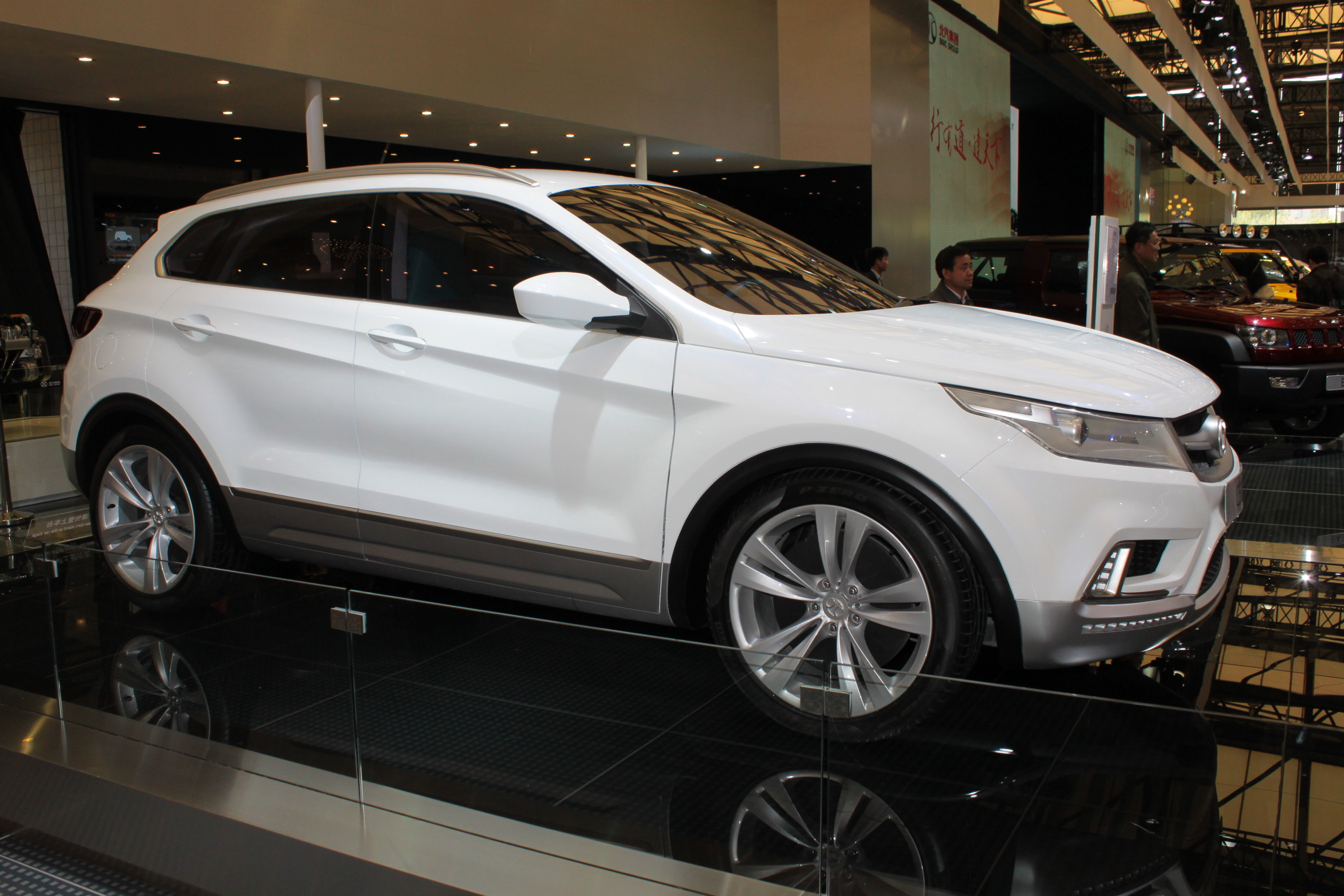
BAIC C51X

In 1978, Robinson spent the summer before his final year in college at the Ford Design Center in Dearborn, Michigan, doing a student internship.

After arriving in Italy, he accepted a job as a designer at a tiny design studio called Open Design run by Aldo Sessano, designing cars, trucks, buses, and industrial design projects. A year later he decided to open his own freelance studio, working primarily for Renault. In 1983 he moved to Ghia, Ford's Italian design center, where he created his first concept car, the Ford Ghia Vignale TSX-4, a forerunner for the Ford Taurus station wagon design.

American designer Chris Bangle, who was Exterior Design Chief at Fiat at the time, called Robinson to come to Fiat to help him reorganize the Fiat design process. Robinson began his career at Fiat working in Advanced Design, where he created the first Virtual Reality room in Europe in 1988. He was nominated Interior Design Chief in 1992 and designed the interior of the Fiat Bravo/Brava which won the European Car of the Year award in 1995. Chris Bangle became the Design Director at Fiat, Walter De Silva was the Design Director at Alfa Romeo, and in 1996, Robinson became the Design Director at Lancia at age 40. His first concept car at Lancia was the 1998 Dialogos, a research vehicle for new luxury sedans exploring new concepts such as flush sedan bumpers.

The Lancia Dialogos concept car was transformed into the 2002 Lancia Thesis production sedan. He was then nominated the Design Director at Fiat in 2001, where he designed Europe's best selling delivery van, the Fiat Ducato/Peugeot Boxer/Citroen Jumper. After his time at Fiat, Robinson was called upon by Lilli Bertone to become the new Brand and Design Director at Bertone in 2009. His first concept car in Bertone was the 2010 Alfa Romeo Pandion which was designed to celebrate Alfa Romeo's 100 year anniversary at the Geneva Auto Show. The Pandion (which is the scientific name for Osprey) is a 2+2 sports car with reverse-opening scissors doors which are 3.4 meters tall when fully opened. The car utilizes a "Skin and Frame" concept stemming from the two-part Alfa Romeo logo, which underlines the new, dynamic mix between the organic frame and the skin that covers it. Many of the components in the car were realized using Algorithm Design technology, a random form generator which allows forms to become much more complex compared to those designed by humans.

The second concept car from Robinson and Bertone was the 2011 Jaguar B99 (Bertone turned 99 years old on this year) and demonstrated the exact opposite in design directions compared to the flamboyant Pandion. The B99 was a compact luxury sedan that lead Jaguar into the BMW 3 Series and Mercedes C-Class market.

In 2012, Bertone presented their centennial concept car called the Bertone Nuccio, to honor Nuccio Bertone. The Nuccio is a two seater, mid-engine sports car with a 500 hp 8-cylinder Ferrari engine. The lines are a mix between the icons of the past such as the Stratos Zero and a decidedly futuristic look. The roof without a rear window denotes the arrival of the digital era, replacing the backlight with external cameras and internal screens. The orange color on the roof is Nuccio Bertone's favorite color, widely used throughout the Bertone Design Center. Another concept car developed simultaneously that year was the Chinese concept SUV called the BAIC C51X, the sister of the BAIC Senova D50 sedan designed by Bertone and launched into production at the 2014 Beijing Auto Show. The success that the C51X had at the 2012 Beijing Auto Show convinced BAIC management to put it into production.

In 2013, Robinson designed the Aston Martin Jet 2+2, a "one-off" prototype, ordered directly by a private British client. The car started as an Aston Martin Rapide, then was transformed into a Shooting brake. The interior was modified according to the requests of the private client, adding a mobile platform to make better use of the rear compartment.

In China the FAW Besturn X80 SUV was launched officially, being the first car designed by Robinson in China.

At the end of 2013, Bertone closed after 101 years of contributions to the world of car design. The 160 employees were sent home overnight, and all client projects were cancelled. "They took the floor out from under our feet," says Robinson, "the people responsible for this should be hung from a tree."

Following the closure of Bertone, Robinson entered into partnership with David Pizzorno, founder of ED, a company with twenty years of experience in automotive engineering. A small group of former Bertone employees followed Robinson into the new company, which now has nearly 400 full-time employees. The very first concept car produced by ED Design was exhibited at the 2014 Beijing Auto Show, in less than 4 months after the opening of the new ED Design department. The prototype is called BAIC Senova D60 Aero, a "GT" version of a standard sedan, which will be launched later this year. Given the extremely short timeframe, the prototype was built in China, followed directly by Robinson himself. Robinson was invited by BAIC to present the world premiere of Senova D50, a car he designed months ago while he was the Director of Design at Bertone, finally unveiled to the public for the first time.

In 2011, Robinson was inducted into the Hall of Fame of car design at the National Automobile Museum of Turin, Italy.
