= Abarth 1500 Biposto =

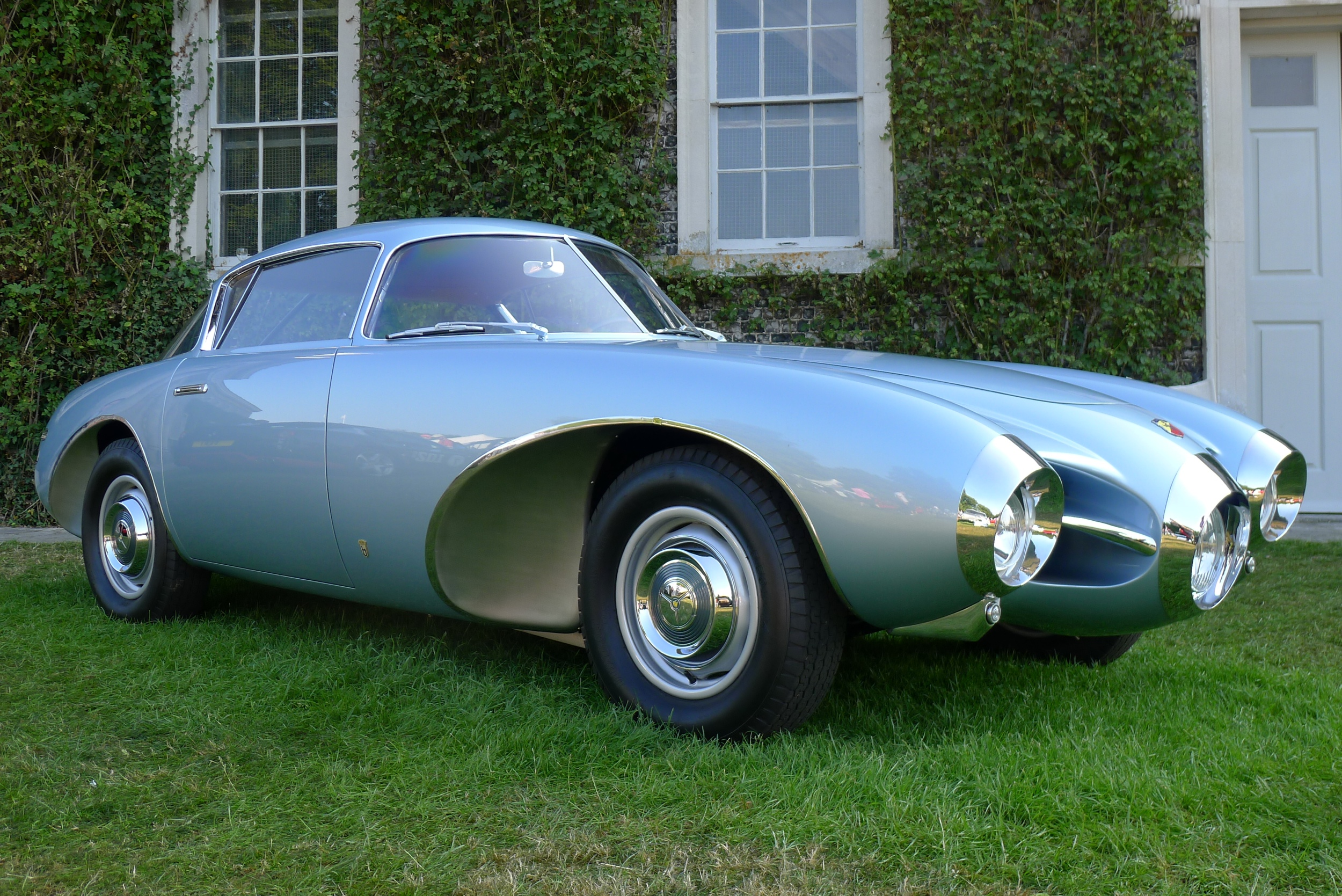
- Abarth 1500 Biposto

Overview
- Manufacturer: Abarth
- Production: 1952
- Designer: Franco Scaglione for Bertone

Body and chassis
- Body style: 2-door coupé
- Layout: Front-engine, rear-wheel-drive
- Related: Fiat 1400

Powertrain
- Engine: 1.5-litre inline 4
- Transmission: 4-speed manual

Dimensions
- Wheelbase: 2,650 mm (104.3 in)
- Length: 4,520 mm (178.0 in)
- Width: 1,650 mm (65.0 in)
- Height: 1,380 mm (54.3 in)
- Kerb weight: 870 kg (1,918 lb)

The Abarth 1500 Biposto is an experimental coupé designed by Franco Scaglione, who worked for Bertone at the time. It was displayed at the 1952 Turin Motor Show. Following the Turin Show, it was purchased by Packard and brought to Detroit, where it was used for design inspiration.

The car is one of the first, if not the first, Abarth cars based on a Fiat model. It features a futuristic design consisting of a central headlight, similar to the earlier Tucker Torpedo, and a vast, panoramic split window plus fins in the rear. The wheelarch design is to emphasize the sporty character. The overall design is believed to have paved the way for the Alfa Romeo BAT series of concept cars.

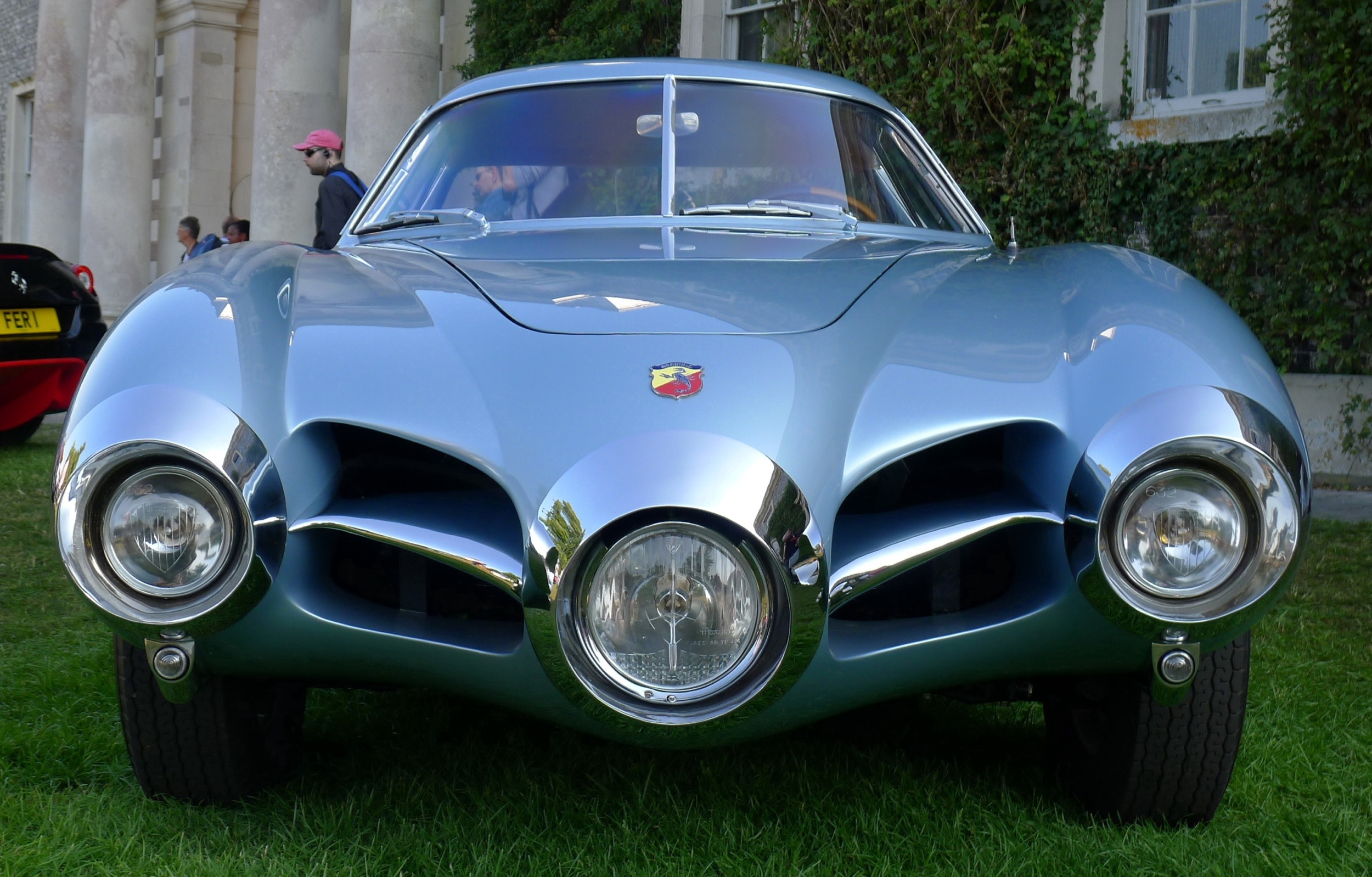
Abarth 1500 Biposto front end

The 1500 Biposto mechanics were mainly sourced from Fiat models. The Fiat 1400 engine has a 2 mm larger bore and measures bore 84 mm (3.3 in) × stroke 66 mm (2.6 in), which results in 1,480 cc and (also thanks to Abarth tuning) 75 bhp (75 hp; 56 kW) output instead of the original 50 hp (37 kW). The Biposto can reach 180 km/h (110 mph). The front suspension features double wishbones and coil springs, the rear suspension has a live axle and semi-elliptic leaf springs. The car has drum brakes on all four corners.

The Biposto was given to motoring journalist Dick Smith in mid-1953 as his prize for suggesting a new Packard advertising slogan. Smith sparingly drove the car for two decades, before putting it into storage. It did not reappear until put up for auction in 2003 where it was acquired by historic racer, car collector and restorer Chris M. Drake.

Unveiled after a 7-year restoration by Chris M. Drake, It won the prestigious Gran Turismo Trophy at the 2010 Pebble Beach Concours d'Elegance and is featured in Gran Turismo 6, Gran Turismo Sport and Gran Turismo 7. The car also won Best in Class at the prestigious Amelia Island Concours in March 2011 and also was shown at the Goodwood Cartier "Style Et Luxe" later that year.
