= LMX Sirex =

Overview
- Manufacturer: LMX
- Also called: Sirex LMS
- Production: 1968-1974
- Designer: Franco Scaglione

Body and chassis
- Class: Sports car
- Body style: 2-door coupe 2-door convertible
- Layout: front engine, rear-wheel drive

Powertrain
- Engine: 2.3 L V6

The LMX Sirex (also sold as Sirex LMS) was an Italian 2-door, 2-seater sports car. The car was the only model produced by LMX Automobile S.R.L. (Linea Moderna Executive), a company founded by Michel Liprandi and Giovanni Mandelli. The body of the LMX Sirex was designed by Franco Scaglione. The LMX Sirex was introduced during the 1968 Turin Auto Show. However, as Liprandi and Mandelli could not afford an official stand, the car was shown outside the exhibition hall.

The car used a 2.3 L V6 Ford Taunus engine, although customers could also choose a different engine if they wished. Convertible and coupé bodywork were available, and the car was built on a central backbone chassis. LMX produced just fifty cars between 1968 and 1973, and another company, SAMAS, built a further twenty after LMX ceased production.
