= Franco Scaglione =

Italian automobile designer

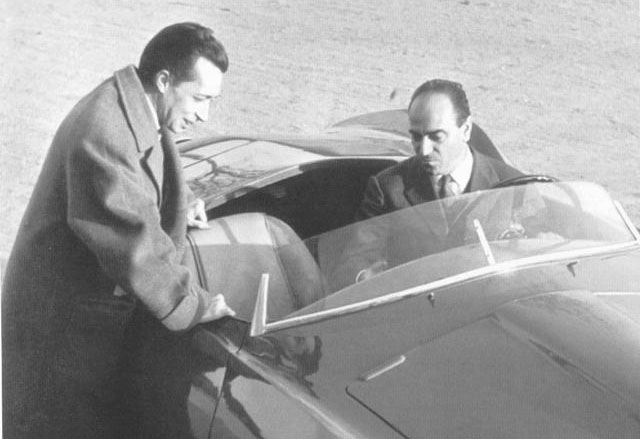
Scaglione on left, with Nuccio Bertone in an Arnolt-Aston Martin DB2/4 in 1953/54

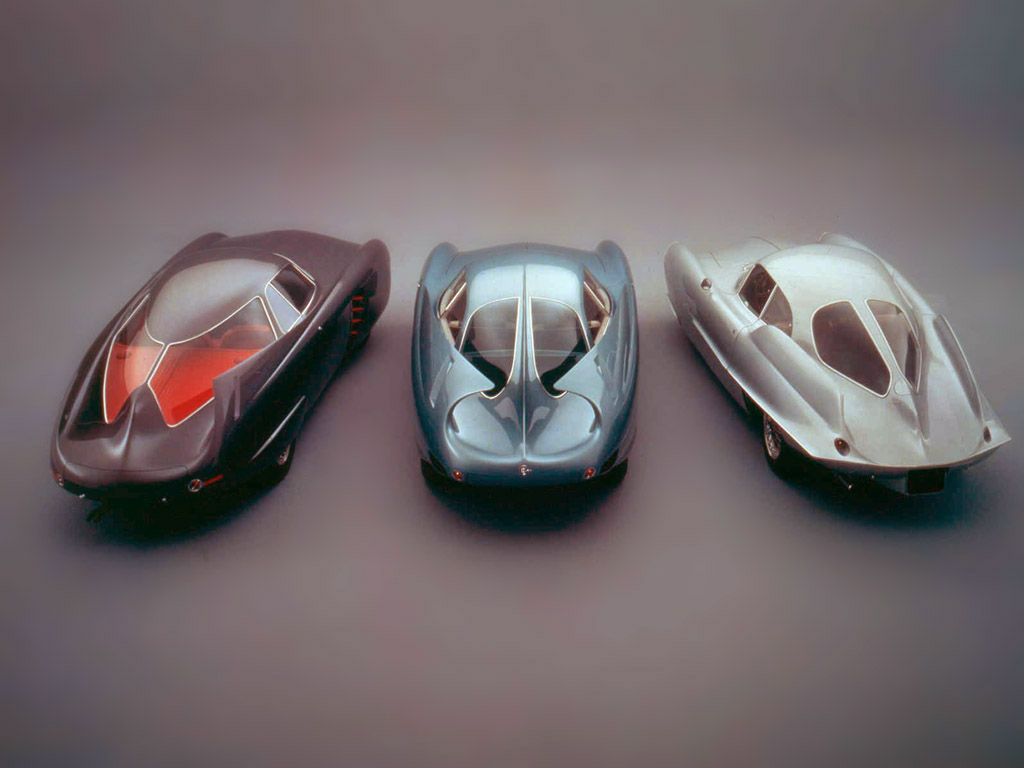
Scaglione's Alfa Romeo BAT concept cars

Franco Scaglione (26 September 1916 – 19 June 1993) was an Italian automobile coachwork designer. He is best known for his work as the chief designer at Carrozzeria Bertone from 1951 to 1959.

== Biography ==
Franco Scaglione was born in Florence to Vittorio Scaglione, a chief army doctor, and to Giovanna Fabbri, captain of the Italian Red Cross service. His was a well-to-do family of noble ancestry (count of Martirano San Nicola and of Mottafilocastro). At the age of 6, he and his younger brother became fatherless.
His studies were of humanistic leanings, but he entered the university of Aeronautical Engineering. His favourite hobbies were reading, tennis, riding and rowing. He went into military service with the rank of sub-lieutenant in the sappers, the Genio Pontieri. He continued his studies, but at the outbreak of the Second World War he volunteered to be assigned to a more destructive unit, the Genio Guastatori and was sent to the Libyan front. On Christmas Eve 1941, he was taken prisoner by the British at El Duda, a village to the south of Tobruk. He was to be interned at the Yol detention camp in India, where he remained until the end of 1946. He returned to Italy on Boxing Day that year with the last boat used for the carrying of prisoners. He rejoined his mother (his brother Eugenio was killed during the war) in Carolei, near Cosenza, and stayed with her for almost a year.
At the beginning of 1948 he went to Bologna in search of a job; he already had it in mind to work as a stylist in the automobile field, his real passion. Initially he devoted his time to sketching clothing for fashion houses, which was very profitable, but his vocation was automobile coachwork design. On 25 September 1948 he married Maria Luisa Benvenuti and two years later, on 10 September, his daughter Giovanna was born.
In April, 1951, he moved to Turin, where there were the major coachbuilding firms, and he contacted Battista Farina, who very much appreciated his renderings. However, this did not result in collaboration, as Farina did not allow his models to be linked to the designer's name. He met Nuccio Bertone and finally an association was born, which led him to create automobiles such as the Alfa Romeo B.A.T.s, the Giulietta Sprint and Sprint Speciale and many others. In 1959 he concluded the exclusive relationship with the Bertone coachworks and worked on his own. His first collaboration as a freelancer was with Carlo Abarth and Porsche, and he designed the Porsche 356 B Abarth Carrera GTL, the acclaimed design forerunner of the 911. Then Scaglione conceived the Lamborghini 350 GTV, the ATS 2500 GT, the 1900 Skyline Sprint for the Japanese Prince company (later to merge in 1966 with Nissan), the Titania Veltro GTT, and various models for Intermeccanica such as the Apollo, Torino, Italia GFX, Italia IMX, Indra. In 1967, he designed for Alfa Romeo's Autodelta the legendary Alfa Romeo 33 Stradale, said by many to be one of the most beautiful cars ever made. Alas, Intermeccanica became bankrupt and the entrepreneur owner, Frank Reisner, moved to Canada. Franco Scaglione, having put his own savings in the production of the Indra, was disillusioned and retired from work.
In 1981 he moved to Suvereto, a little village in the province of Livorno, where he lived a very secluded life. In July, 1991, he was diagnosed with lung cancer. He died two years later.

== Designs ==
=== 1952 ===
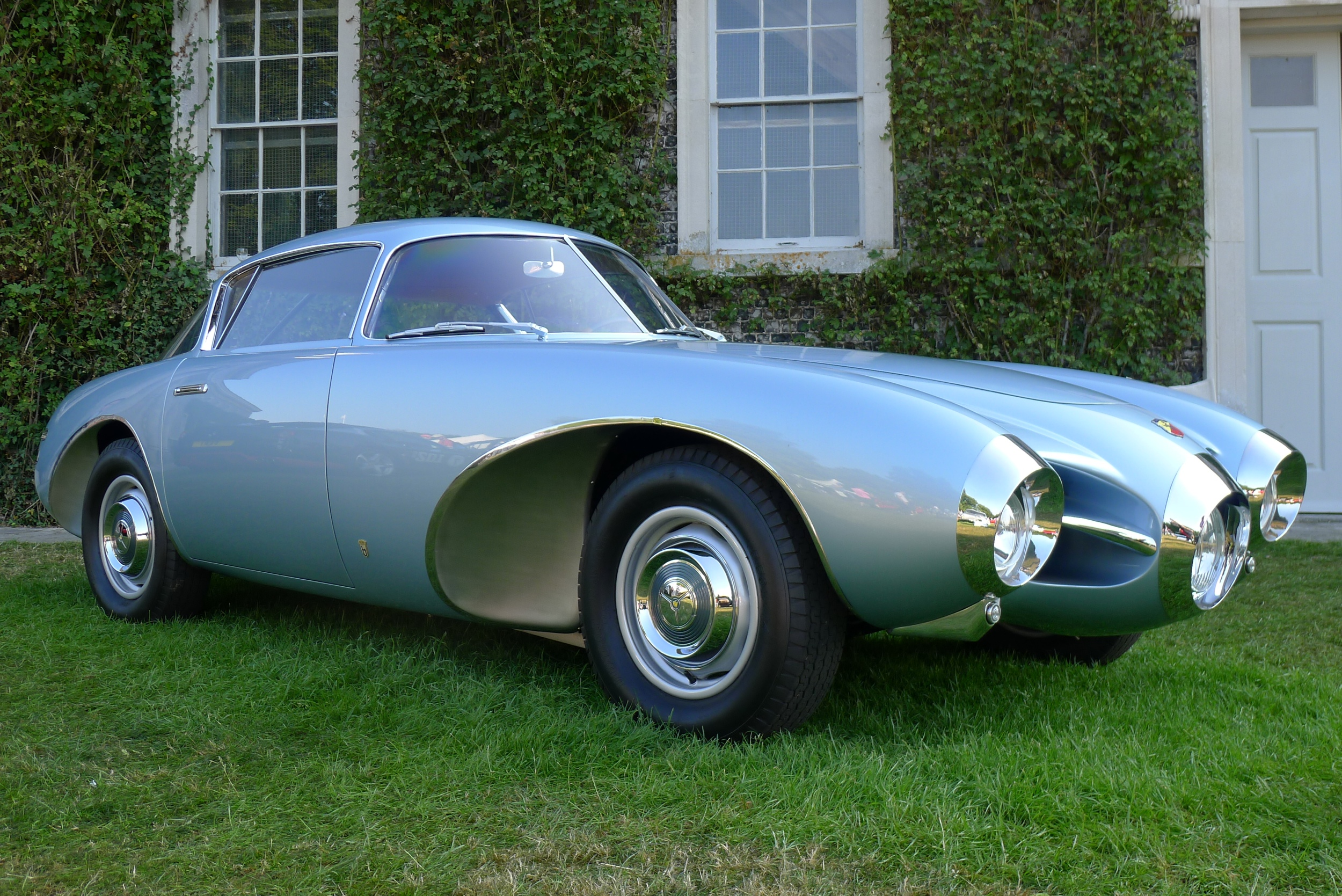
Abarth 1500 Biposto

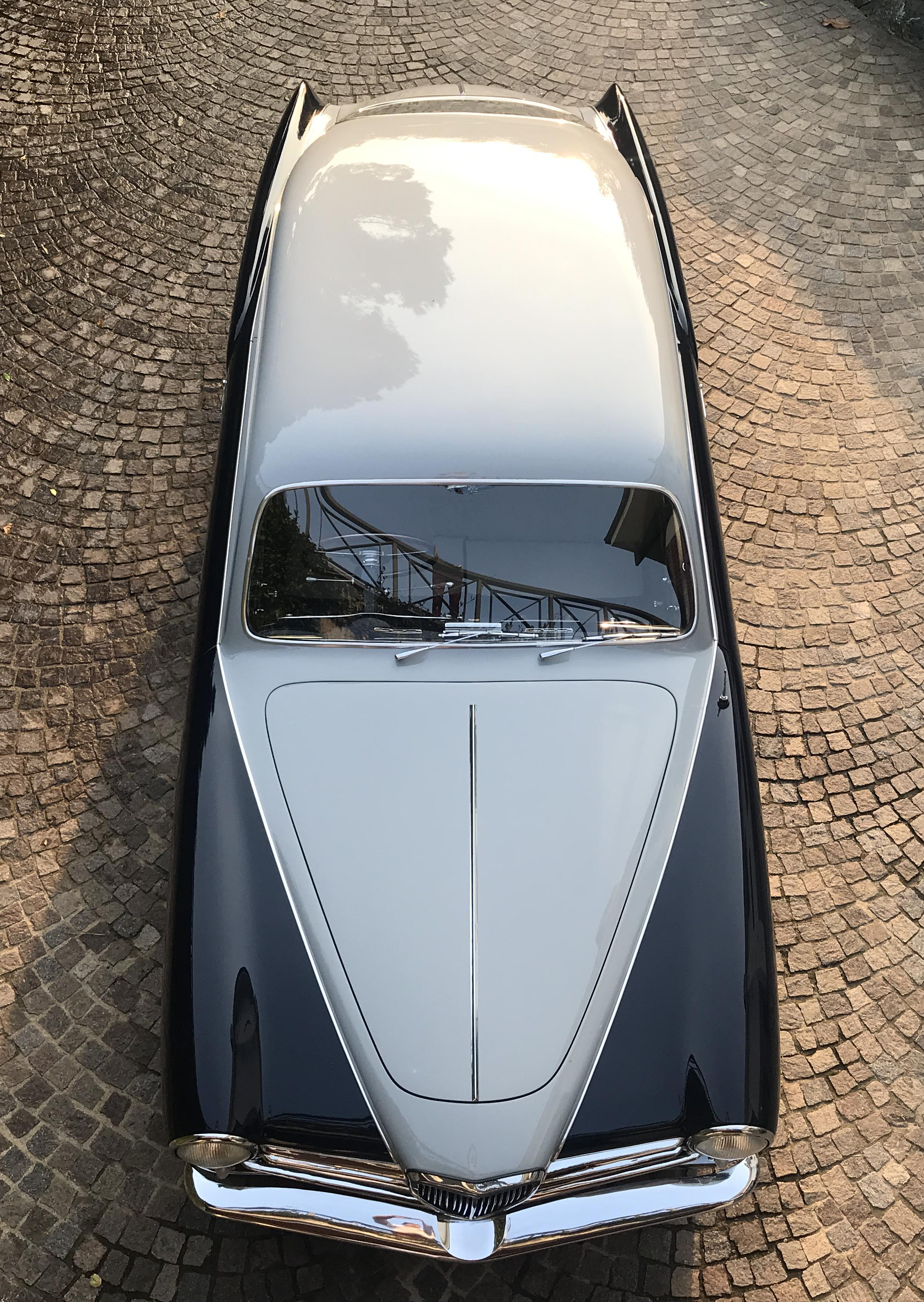
Lancia Aurelia B53 Balbo 1952

- Fiat 1100 "Utiletta Frasca" (Carrozzeria Ansaloni)
- Abarth 1500 Biposto Coupé Bertone
- Siata 208 CS sports racing
- Siata 208 CS coupé 2+2
- Lancia Aurelia B53 Balbo (One-off)

=== 1953 ===
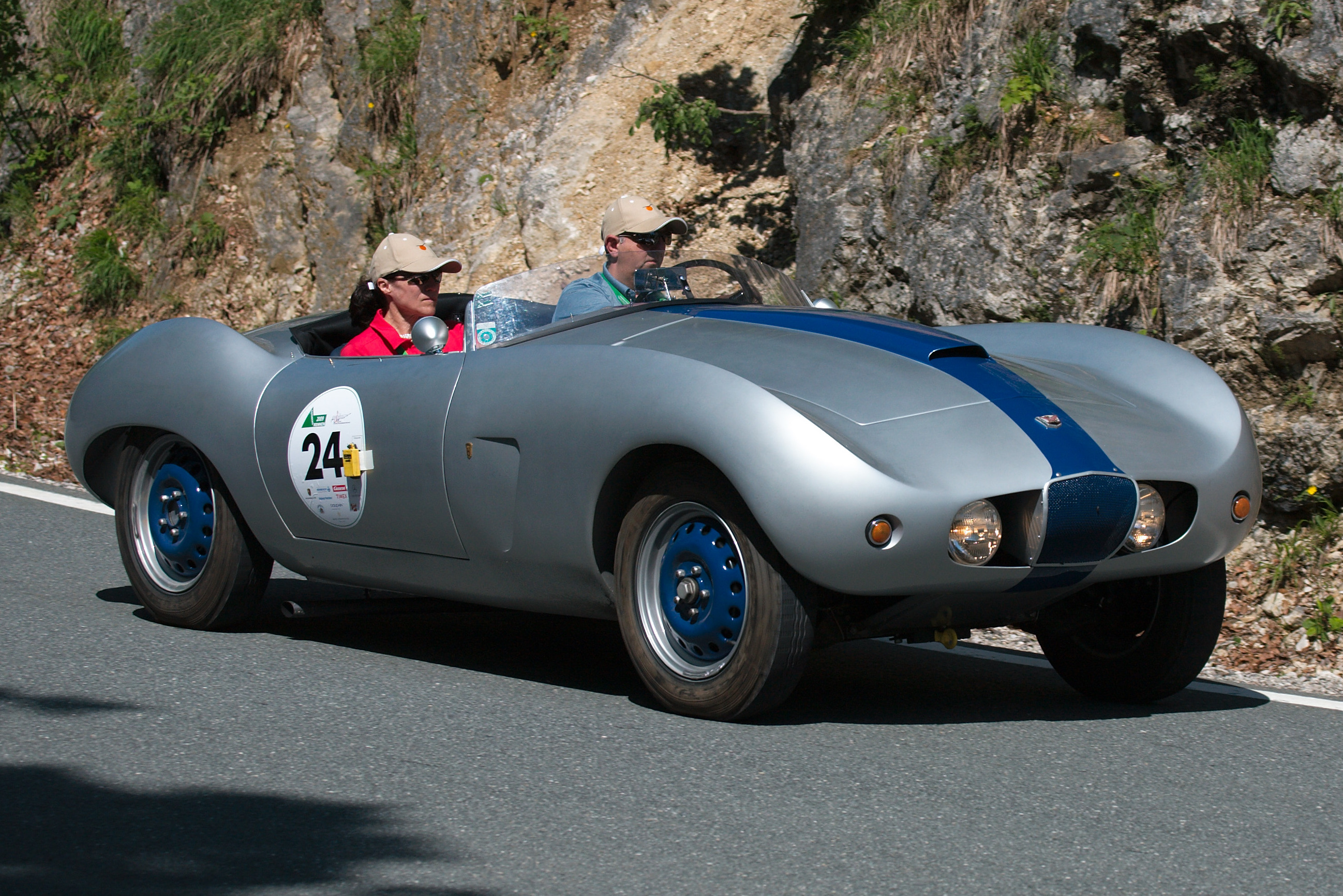
Arnolt-Bristol 404 spider

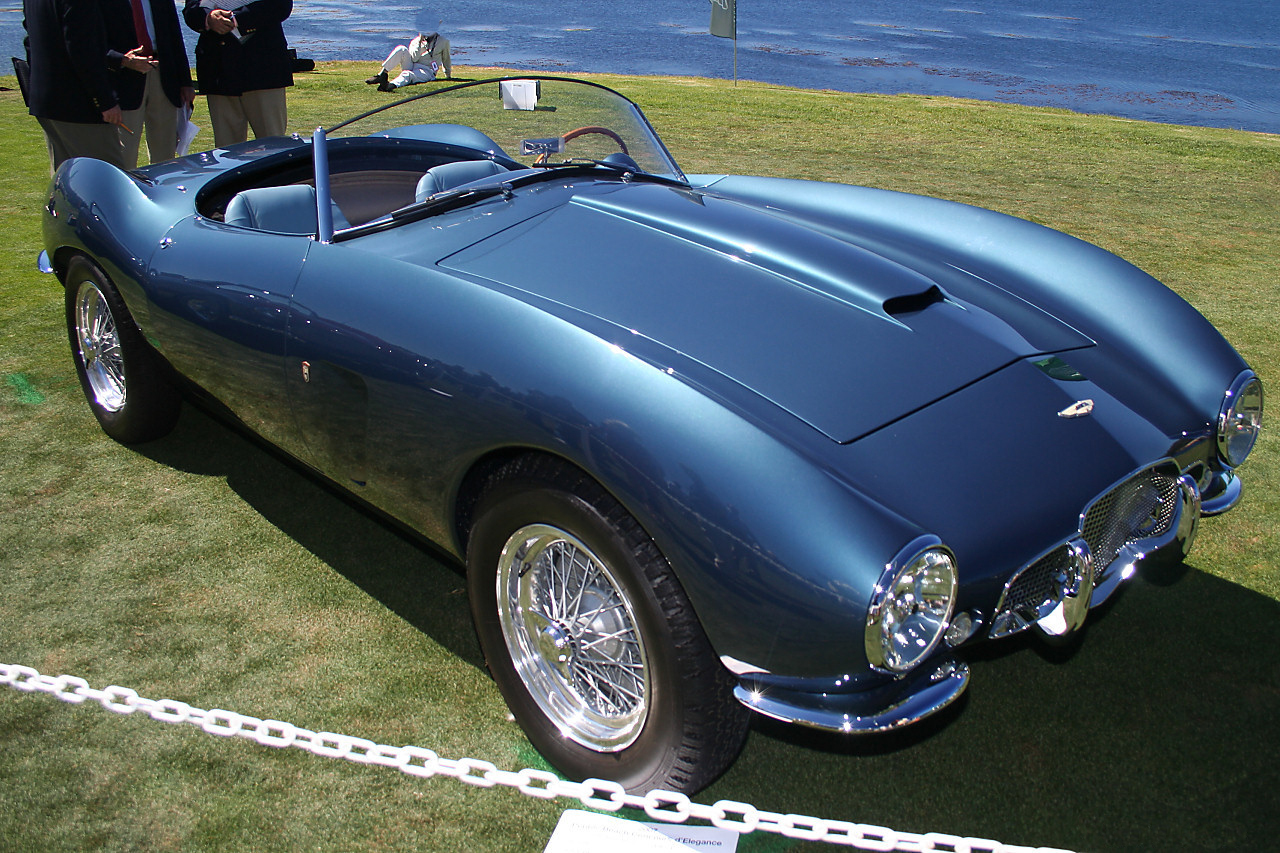
Arnolt-Aston Martin DB2/4 Spider

- Fiat 1100 /103 TV Savio Sport berlinetta
- Alfa Romeo Berlinetta Aerodinamica Tecnica (B.A.T.) 5
- Alfa Romeo 1900L two-door saloon Bertone
- Arnolt-Aston Martin DB2/4 sports racing Bertone (2 examples)
- Arnolt-Aston Martin DB2/4 spider Bertone
- Ferrari-Abarth 166 MM/53 sports racing Bertone
- Arnolt-Bristol 404 X sports racing Bertone

=== 1954 ===
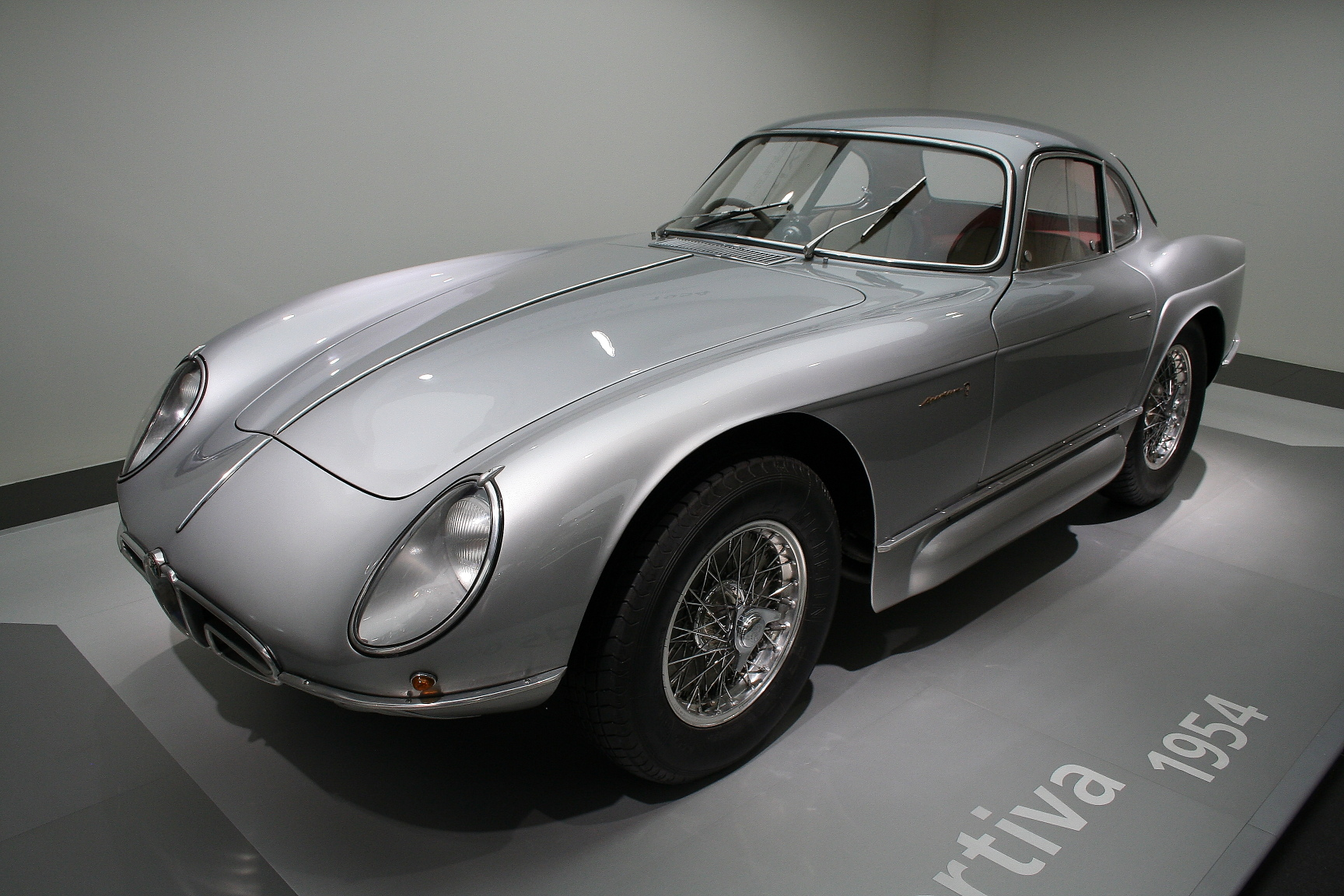
Alfa Romeo 2000 Sportiva

- Arnolt-Bristol 404 X spider gran turismo Bertone
- Arnolt-Bristol 404 X coupé gran turismo Bertone
- Siata 208 CS coupé
- Alfa Romeo 2000 Sportiva racing berlinetta (prototype) Bertone
- Alfa Romeo 2000 Sportiva sports racing (prototype) Bertone
- Alfa Romeo Giulietta Sprint berlinetta Bertone
- Alfa Romeo Berlinetta Aerodinamica Tecnica (B.A.T.) 7
- Fiat-Stanguellini 1100 /103 TV berlinetta Bertone
- Fiat-Stanguellini 1100 /103 TV 'Cheetah' spider Bertone

=== 1955 ===
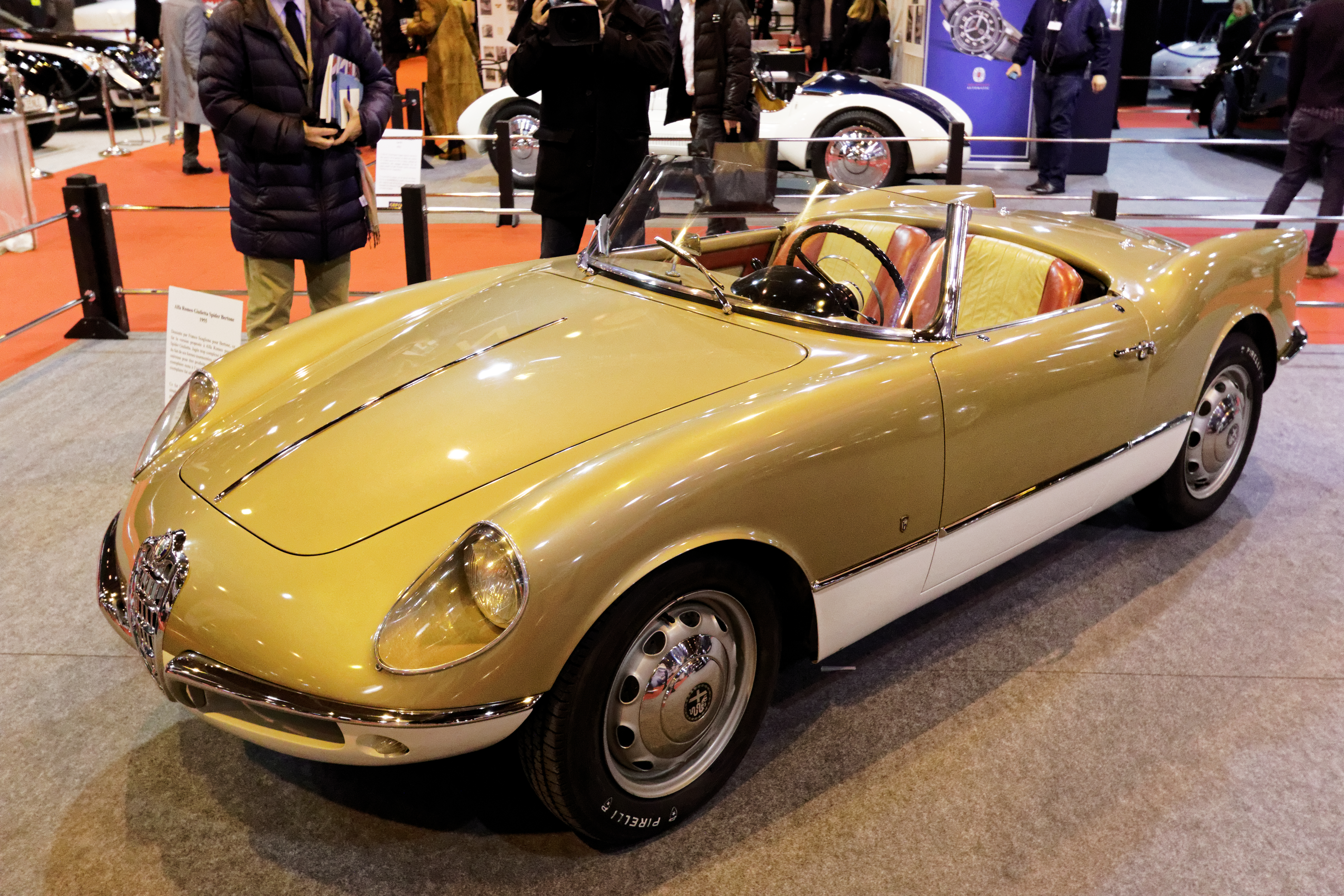
Alfa Romeo Giulietta Spider prototype

- Alfa Romeo Giulietta Sprint Spider prototype 002 Bertone
- Alfa Romeo Giulietta Sprint Spider prototype 004 Bertone
- Alfa Romeo 1900 convertible "Perla" Bertone
- Alfa Romeo Berlinetta Aerodinamica Tecnica (B.A.T.) 9

=== 1956 ===
- Fiat-Abarth 750 Record Bertone
- Fiat Abarth 215 A Coupé Bertone
- Fiat Abarth 216 A Spyder Bertone
- Arnolt-Aston Martin DB2/4 convertible Bertone

=== 1957 ===
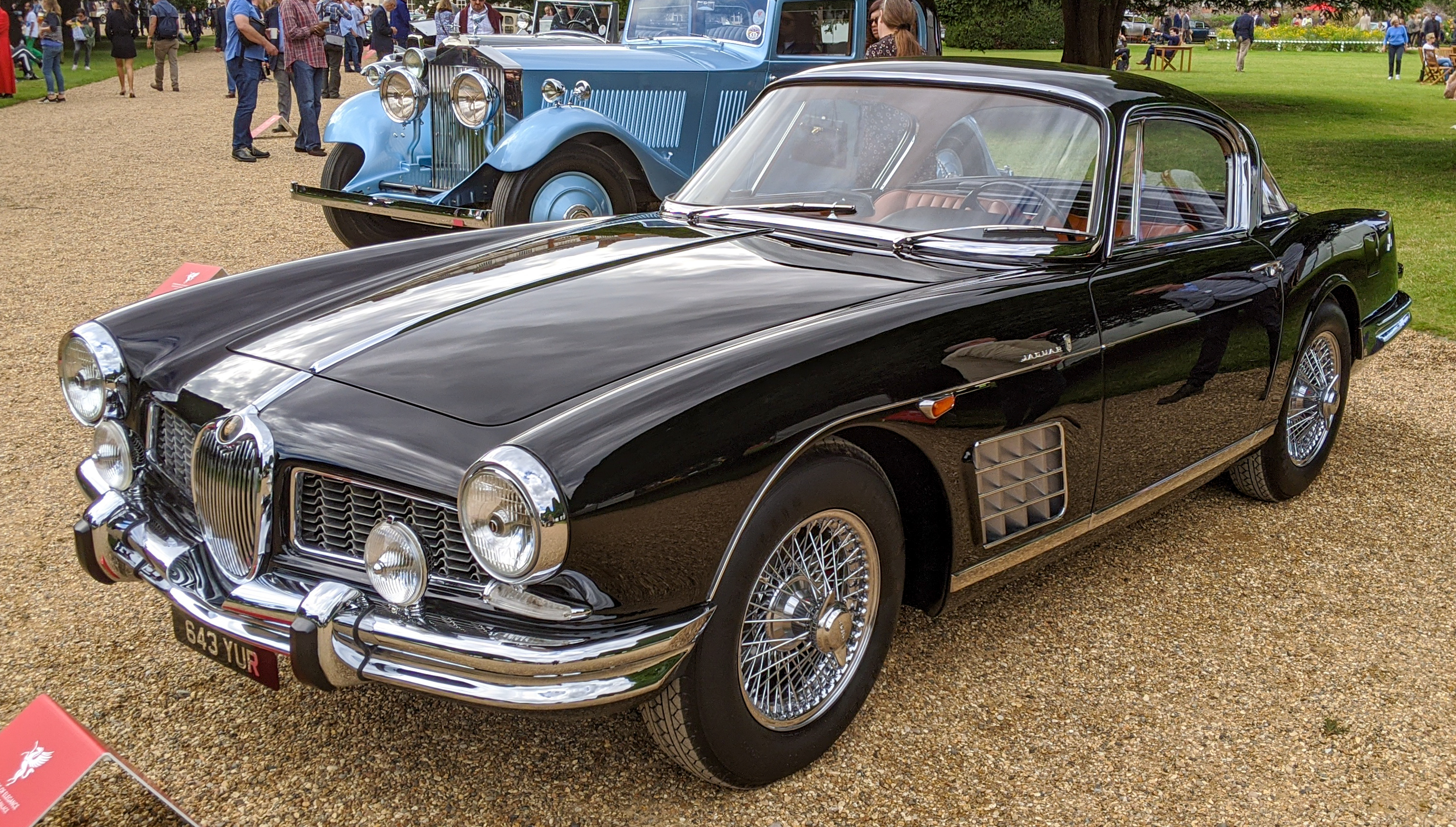
Jaguar XK150 Coupé Bertone

- Fiat-Stanguellini 1200 spider 'America' Bertone
- Aston Martin DB2/4 coupé Bertone
- Jaguar XK150 coupé Bertone
- Alfa Romeo Giulietta Sprint Speciale berlinetta Bertone

=== 1958 ===
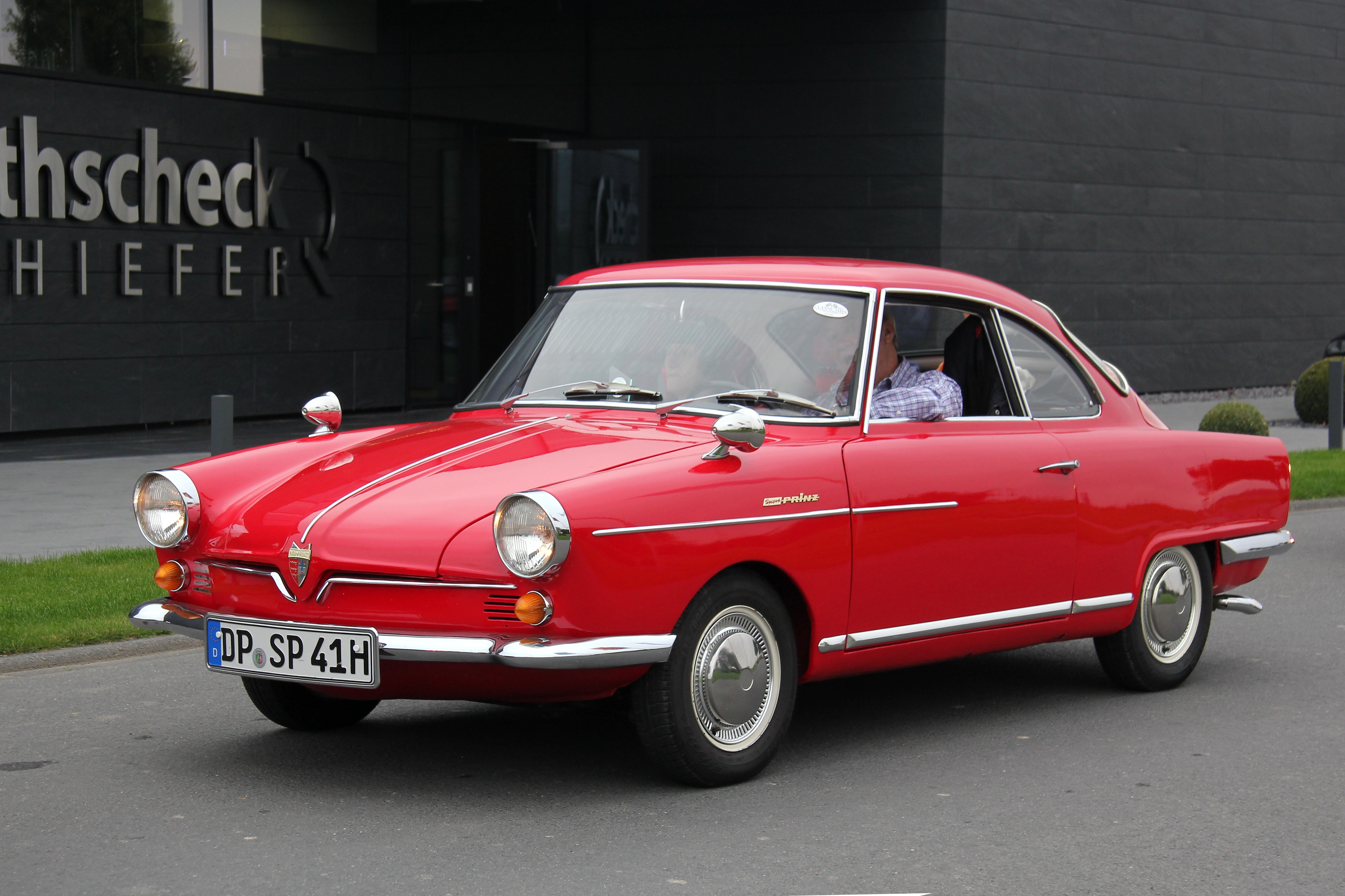
NSU Prinz Sport coupé

- Alfa Romeo-Abarth 1000 berlinetta competizione, for Bertone
- NSU Prinz Sport coupé (the first 1700 or so, constructed by Bertone)

(Developed from Scaglione design but built in his absence):

- NSU Prinz Sport spider Wankel (prototype 1960, produced from 1963)

=== 1959 ===
- Maserati 3500 GT coupé Bertone
- Fiat-O.S.C.A. 1500 berlinetta Bertone
- Fiat 1200 "Granluce" berlinetta Bertone
- Alfa Romeo 2000 "Sole" Bertone
- NSU Prinz 4 two-door saloon prototype

=== 1960 ===
- Porsche 356 B Carrera GTL Abarth berlinetta, Carrozzeria Rocco Motto

=== 1961 ===
- Redesign for Intermeccanica "Apollo" berlinetta 2+2

=== 1962 ===
- Maserati Tipo 64 'Supercage'

=== 1963 ===
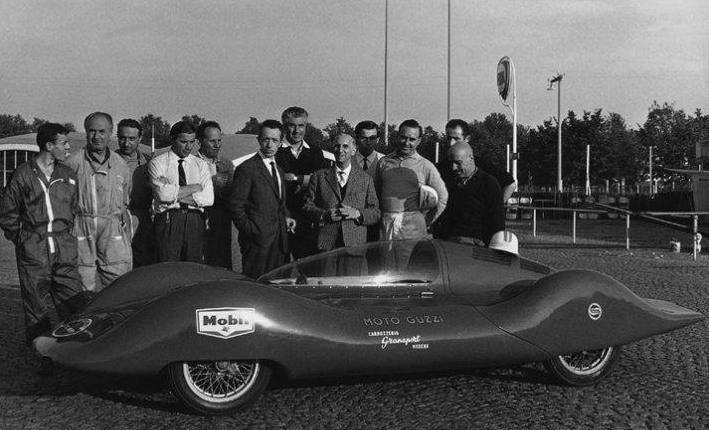
Stanguellini-Guzzi Colibrì with Franco Scaglione and Vittorio Stanguellini

- Prince Motors 'Skyline 1900 Sprint' berlinetta
- Apollo GT
- Apollo convertible
- Lamborghini 350 GTV coupé prototype
- Stanguellini-Guzzi 'Colibrì' record runner
- ATS 2500 GT

=== 1964 ===
- Intermeccanica "Griffith" coupé (and convertible?)

=== 1966 ===
- Titania "Veltro GTT"
- Intermeccanica "Torino" convertible and coupé

=== 1967 ===
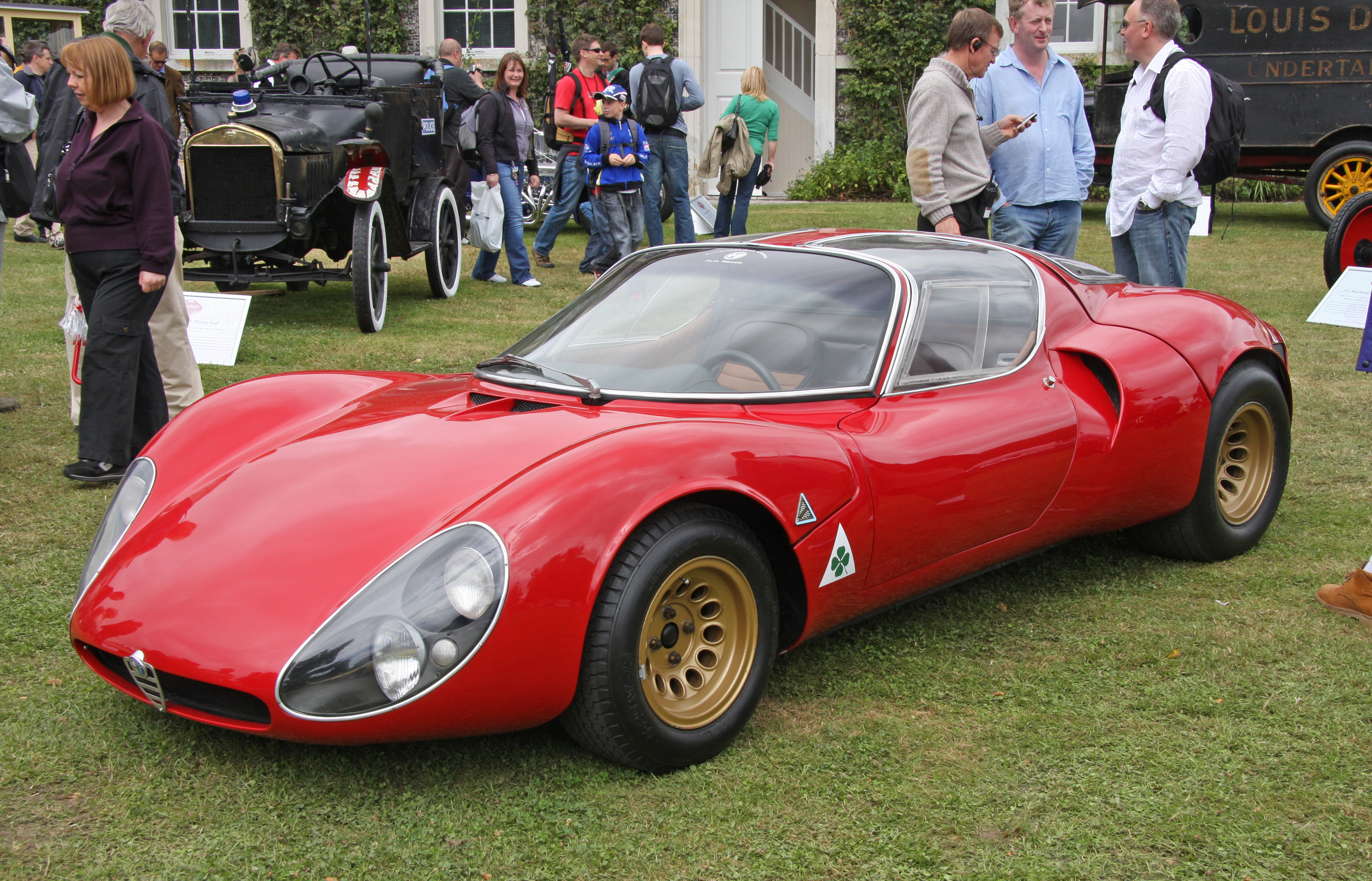
Alfa Romeo 33 Stradale

- Alfa Romeo 33 Stradale
- Intermeccanica "Italia GFX" convertible and coupé

=== 1968 ===
- LMX Sirex

=== 1970 ===
- Intermeccanica "Italia IMX" berlinetta competizione

=== 1971 ===
- Intermeccanica "Indra" convertible

=== 1972 ===
- Intermeccanica "Indra" coupé

== Gallery ==
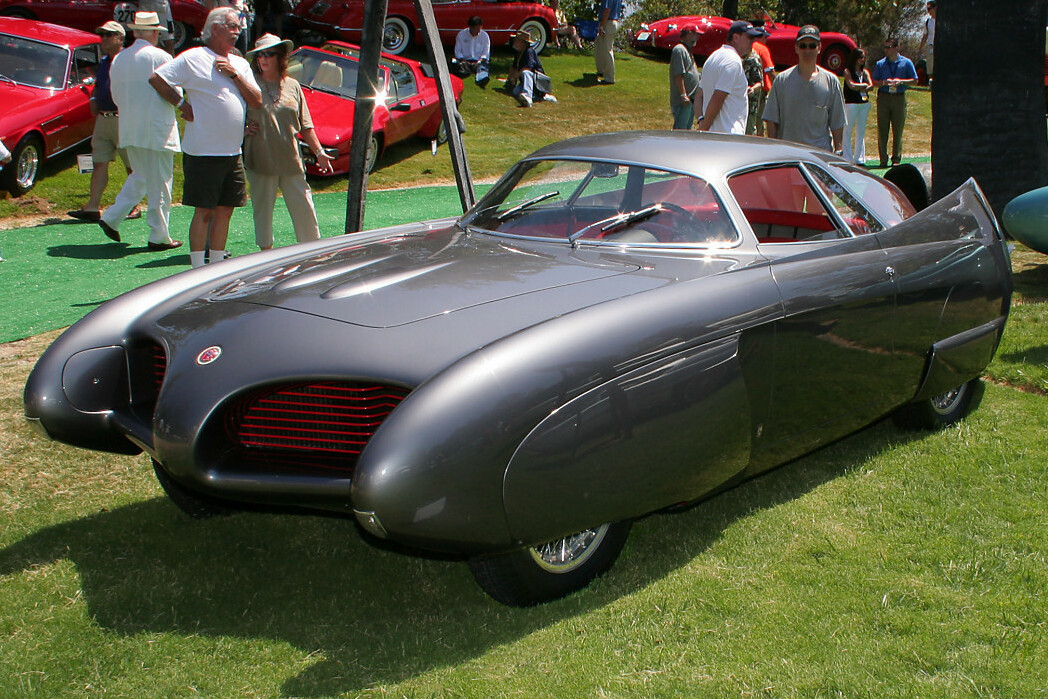
Alfa Romeo B.A.T. 5

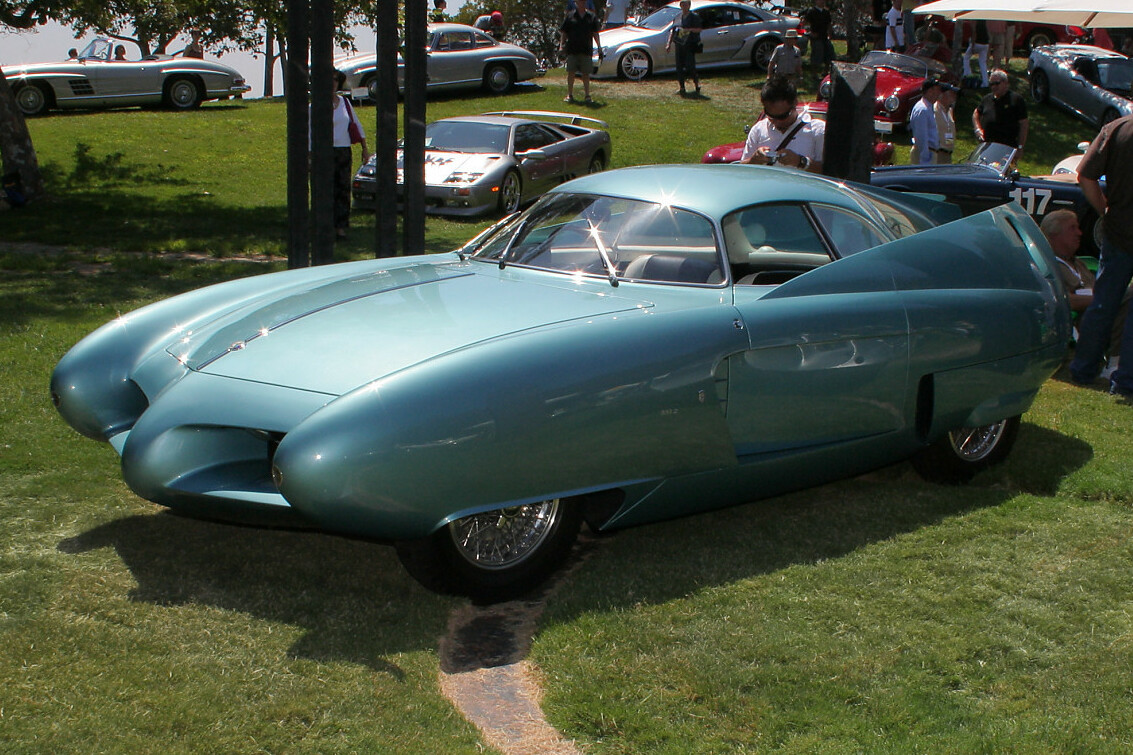
Alfa Romeo B.A.T. 7

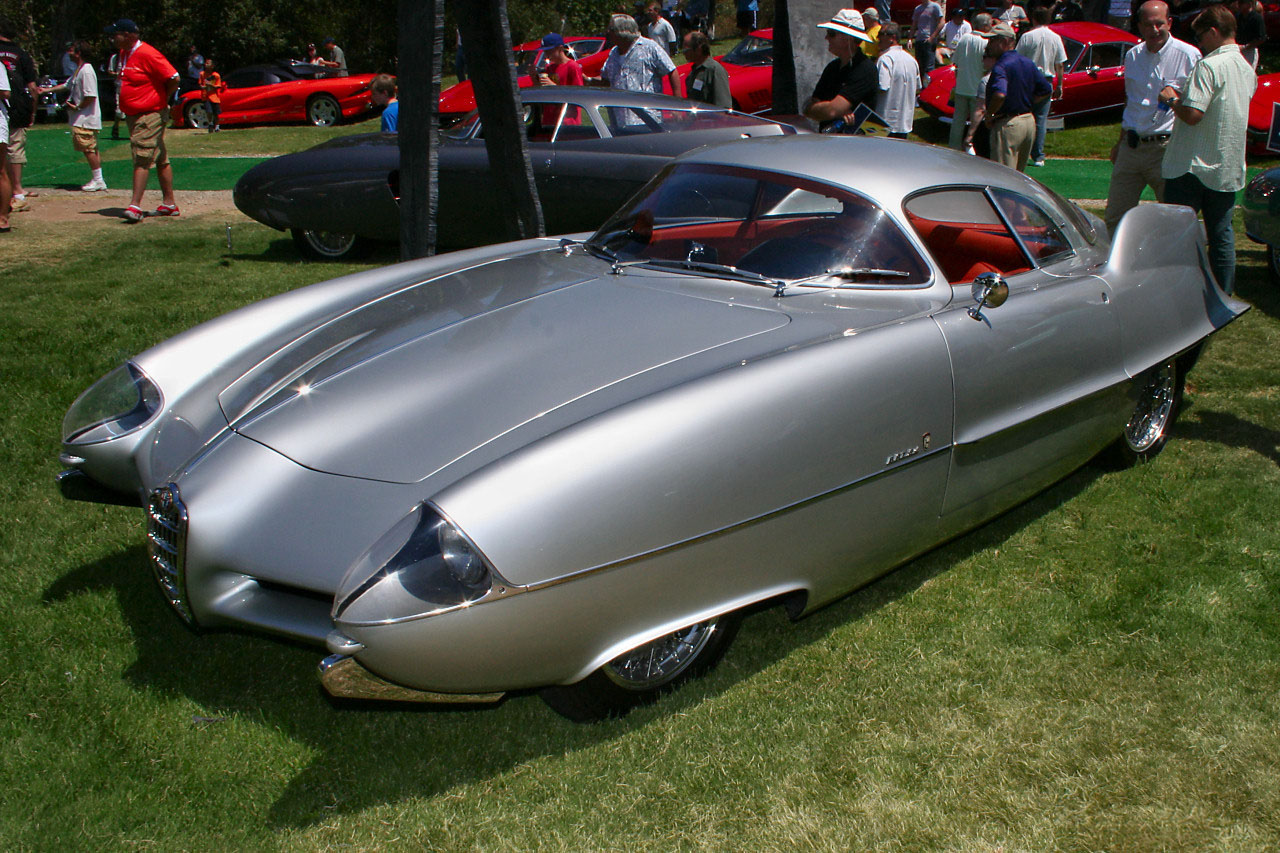
Alfa Romeo B.A.T. 9

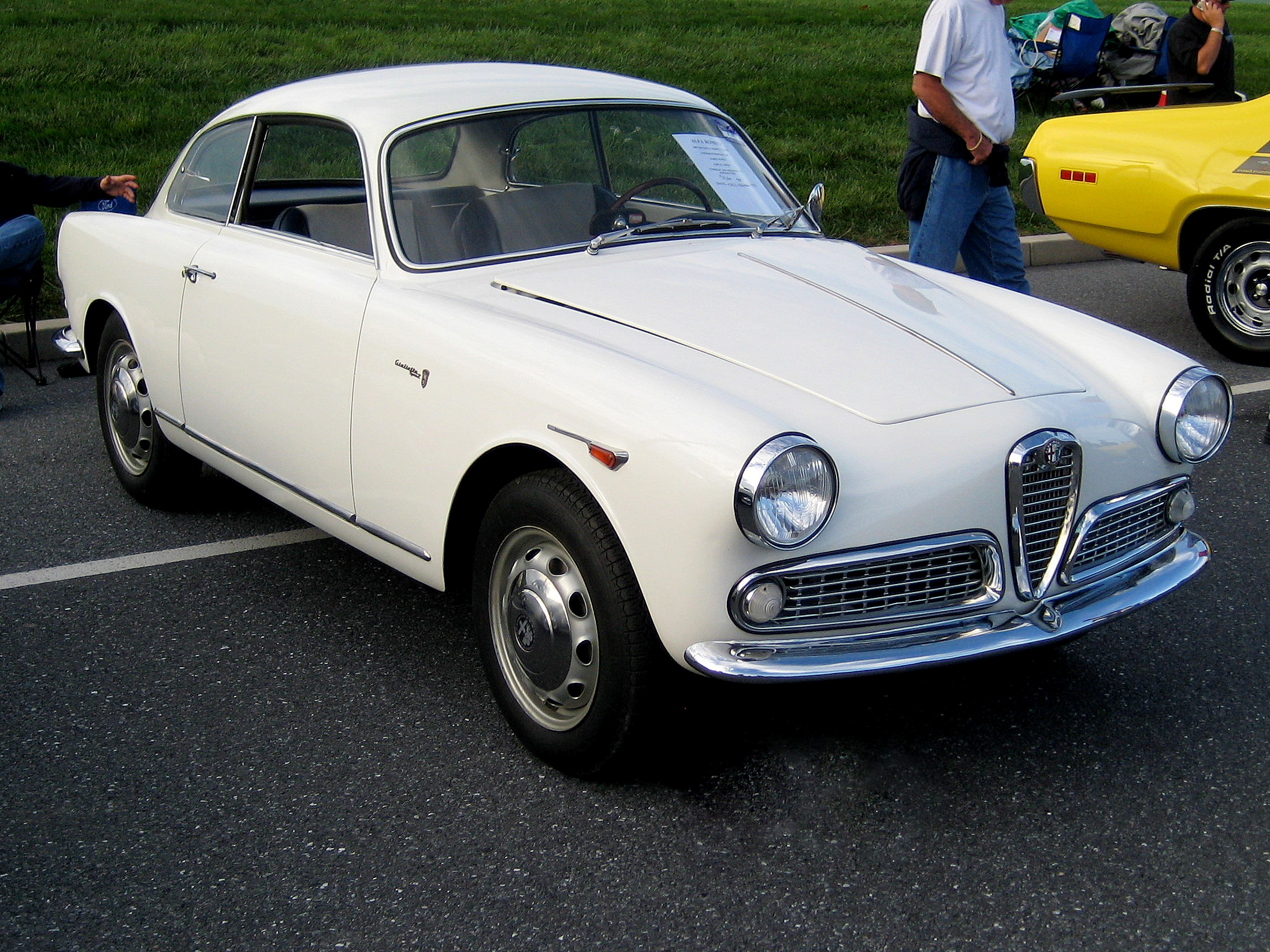
Alfa Romeo Giulietta Sprint

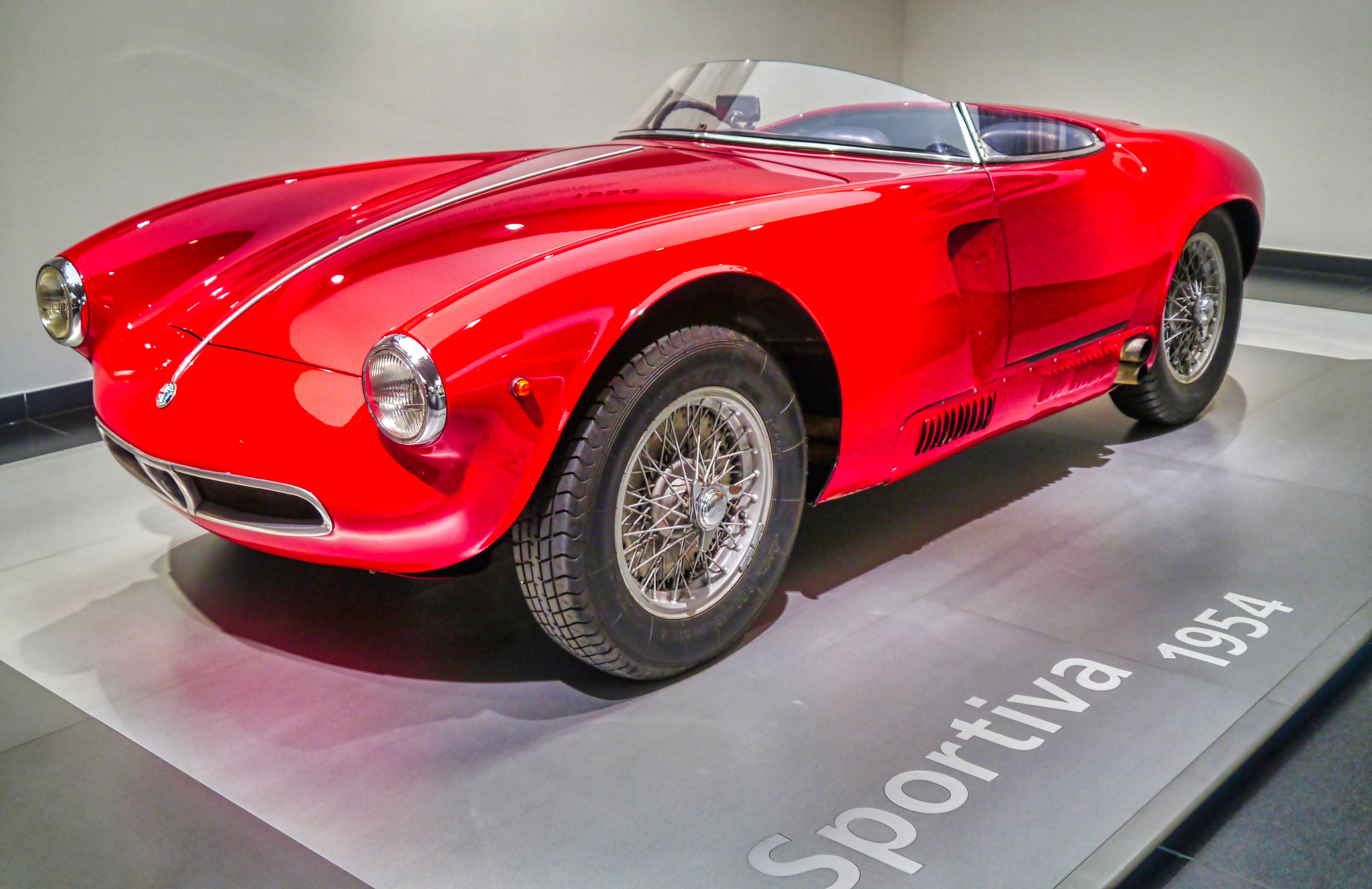
Alfa Romeo 1900 Sport Spider

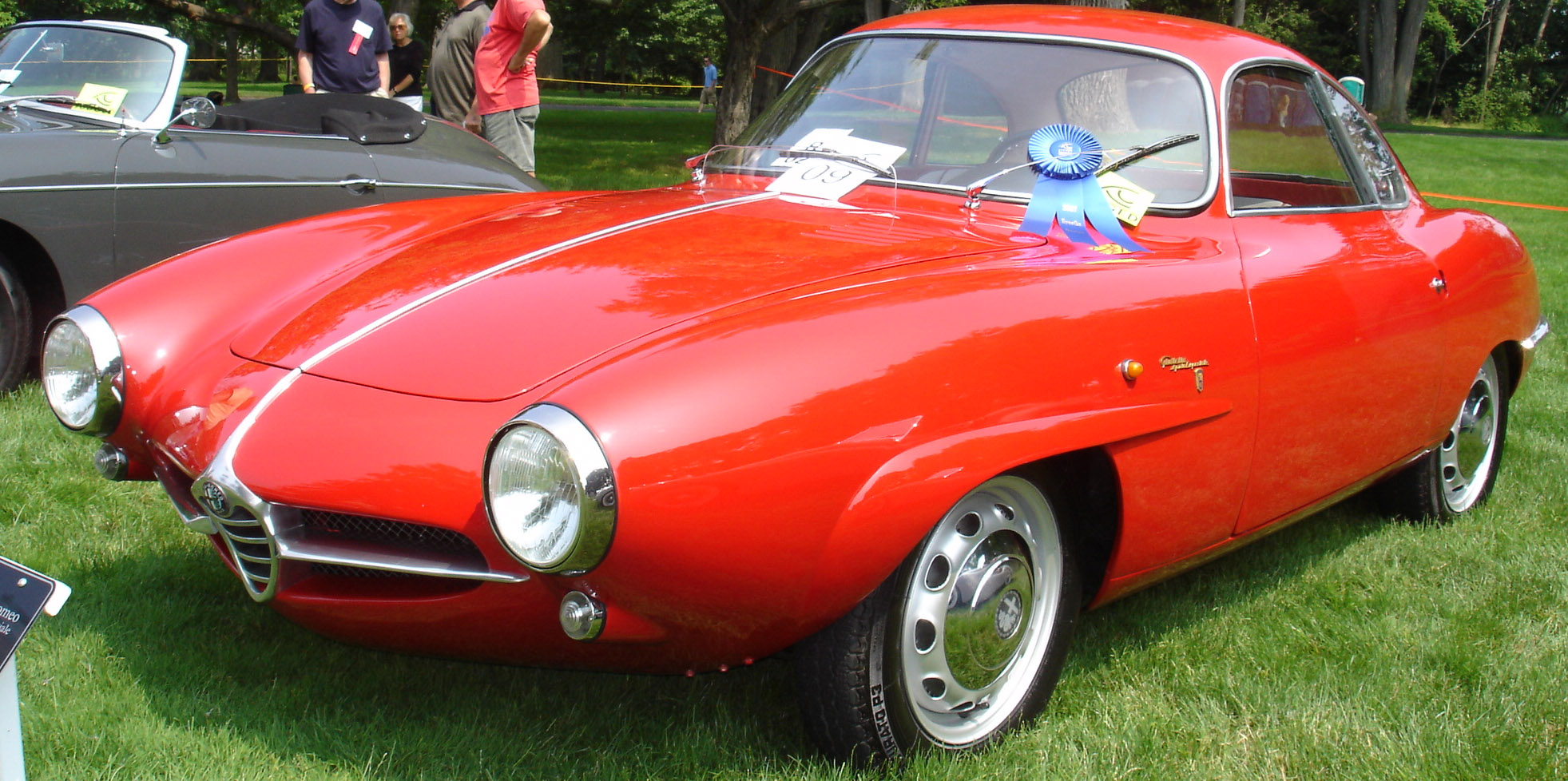
Alfa Romeo Giulietta Sprint Speciale

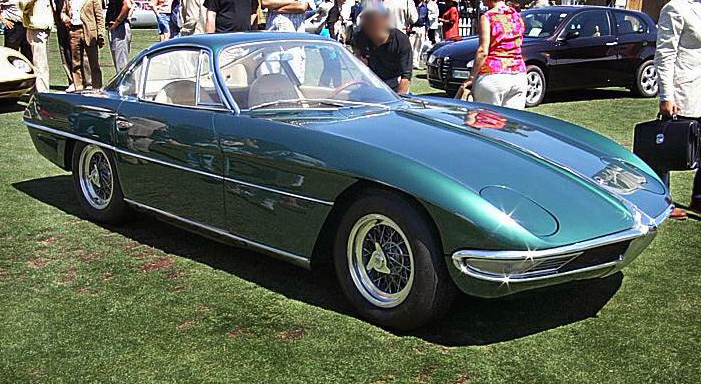
Lamborghini 350 GTV

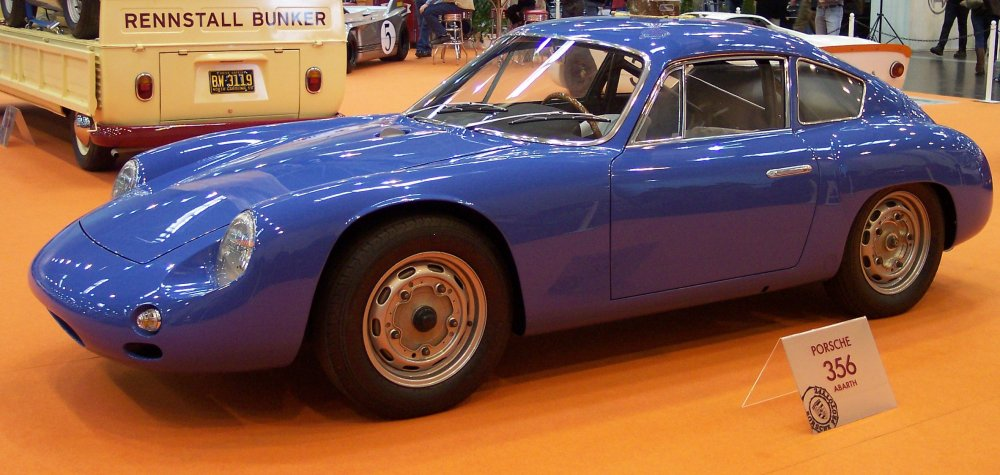
Porsche 356 B Carrera GTL Abarth

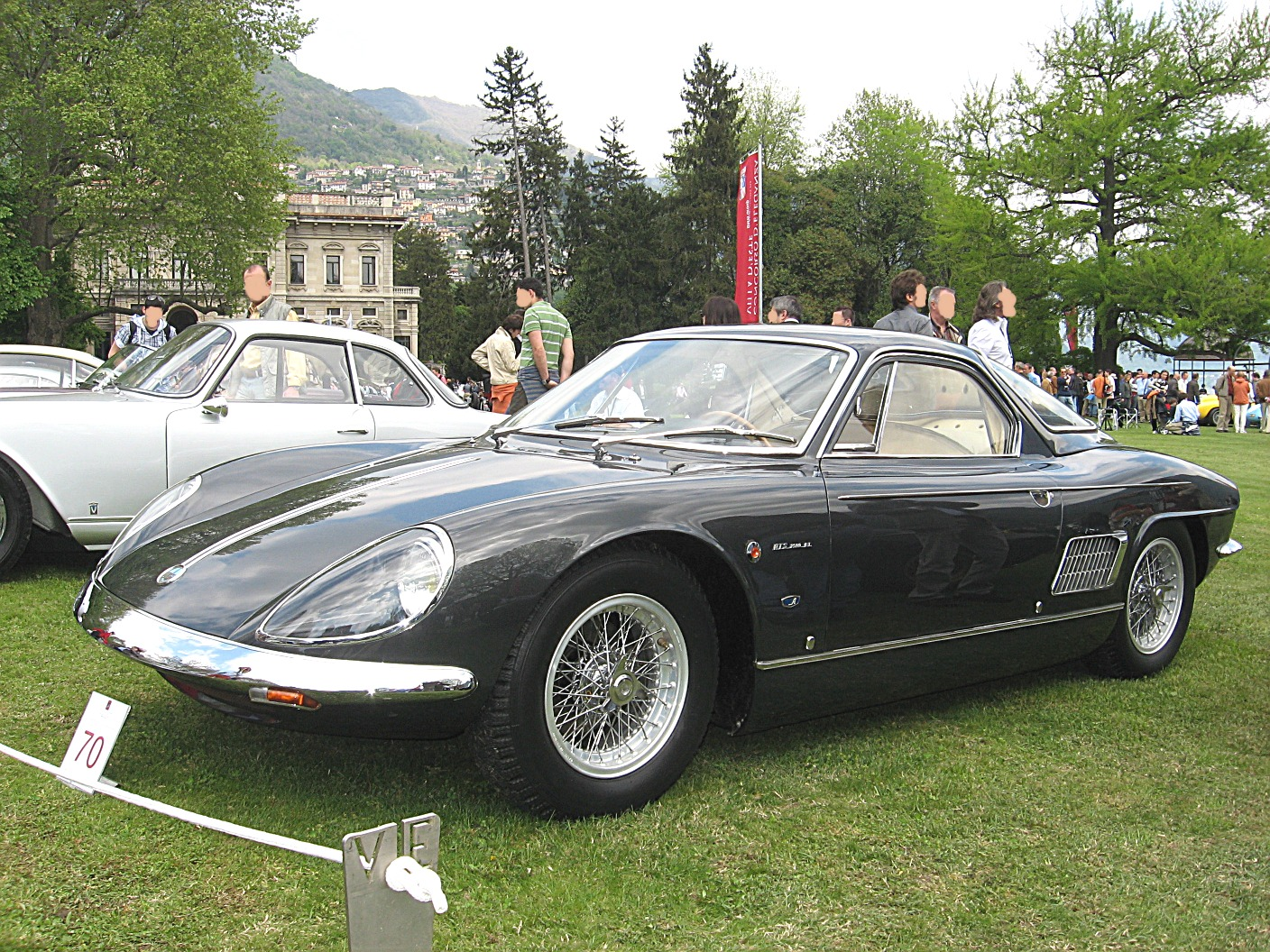
ATS 2500 GT

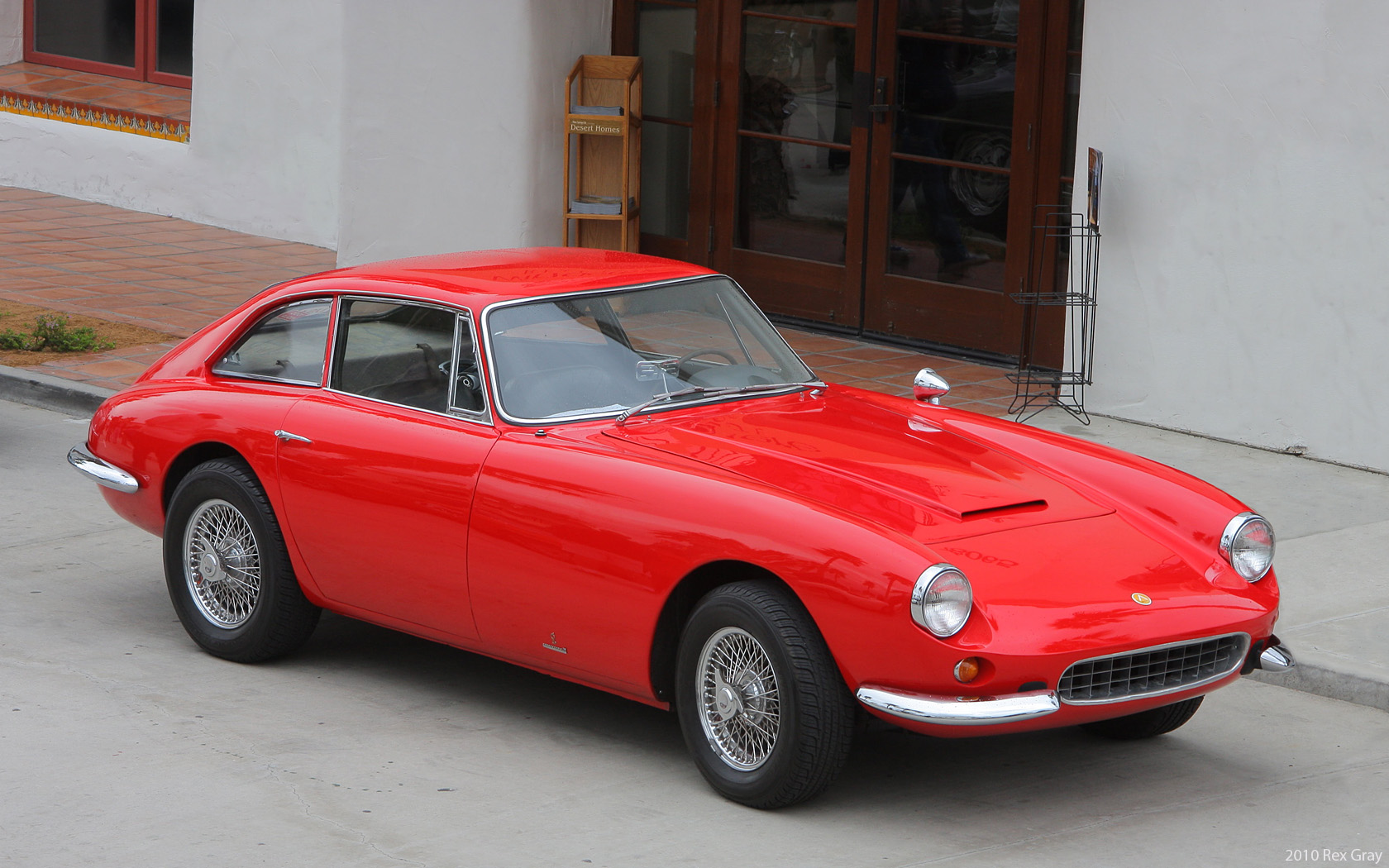
1965 Apollo 5000 GT Coupe

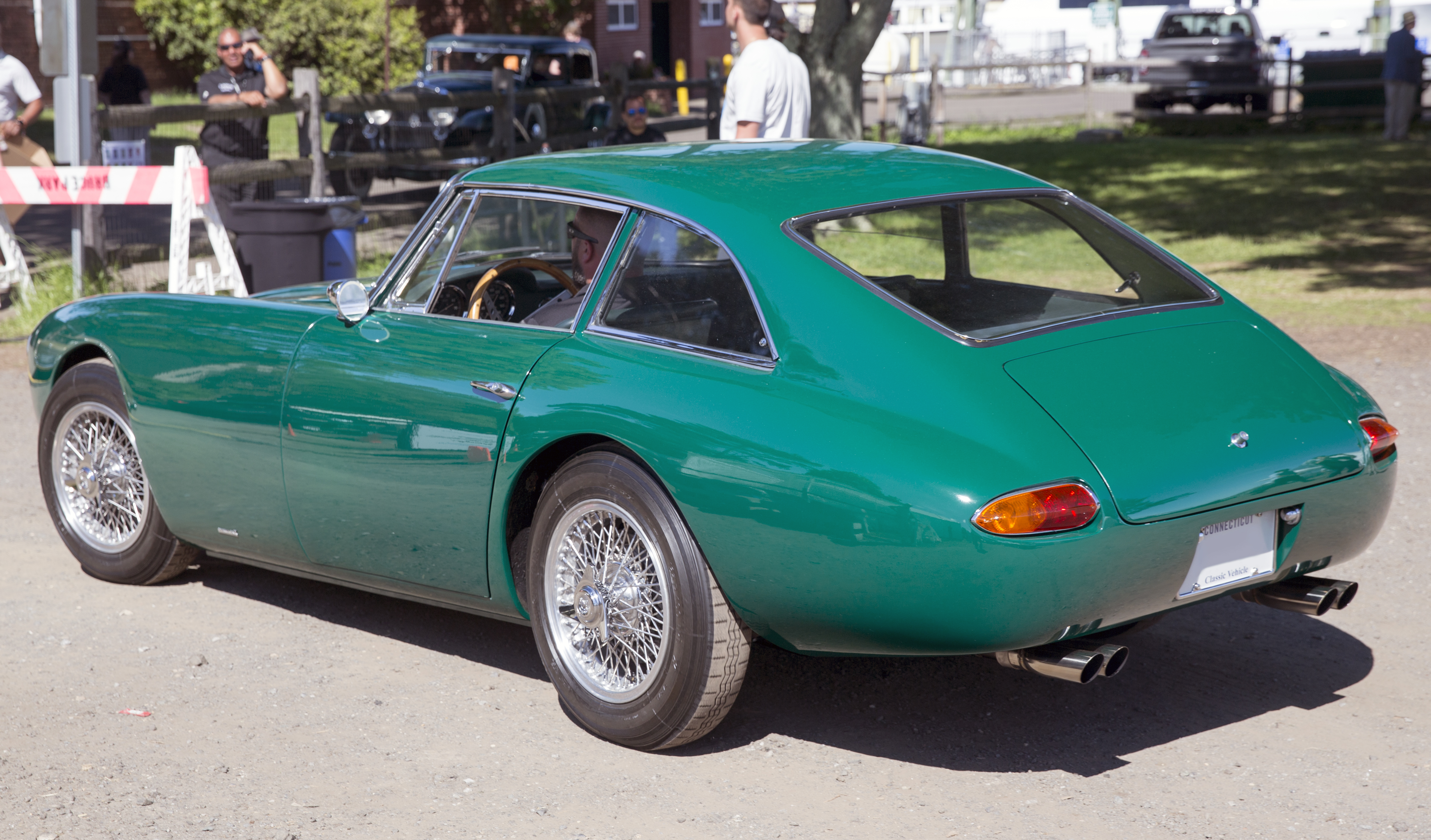
1965 Apollo 5000 GT

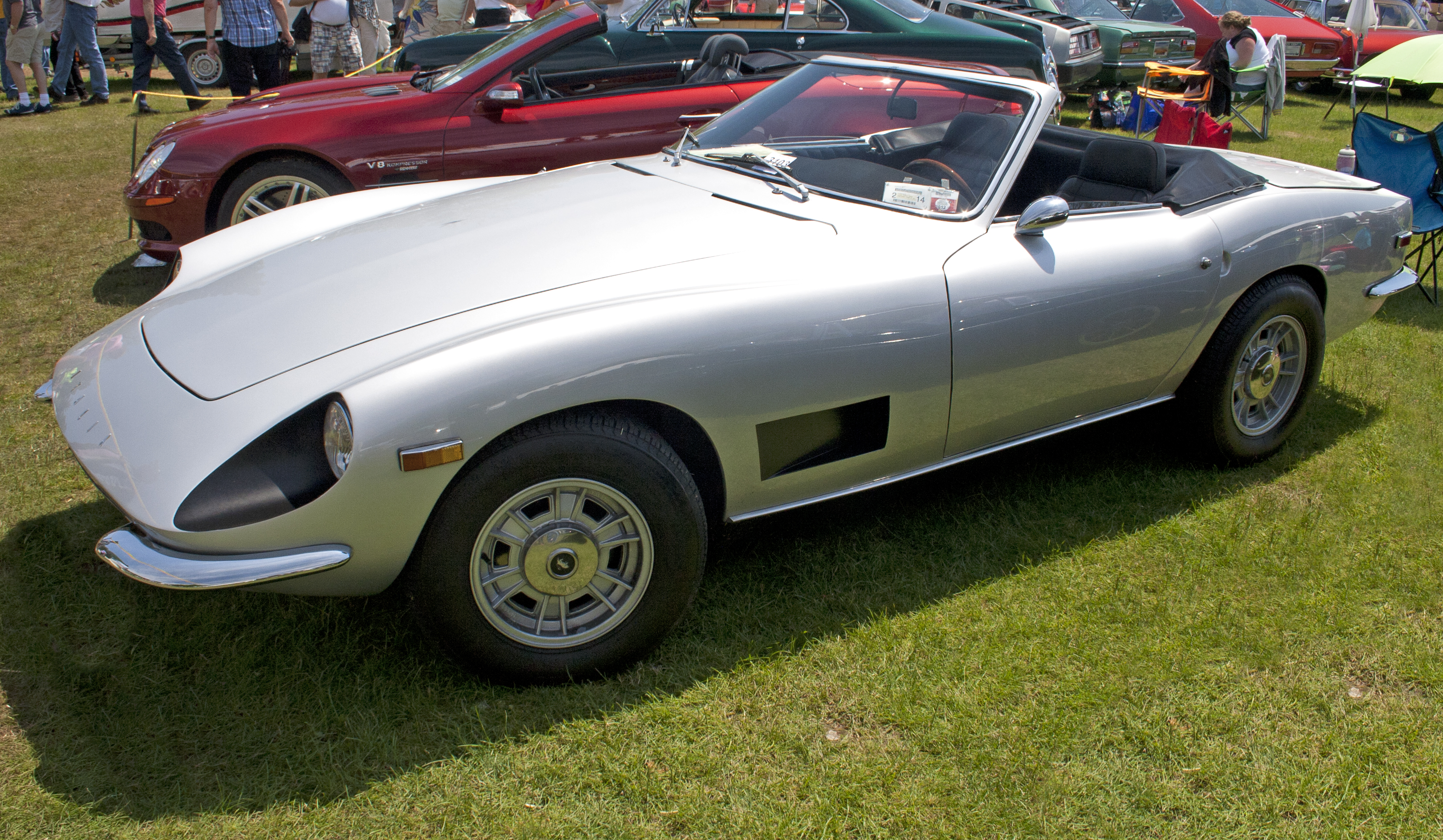
1972 Intermeccanica Italia convertible
