= Alfa Romeo 2000 Sportiva =

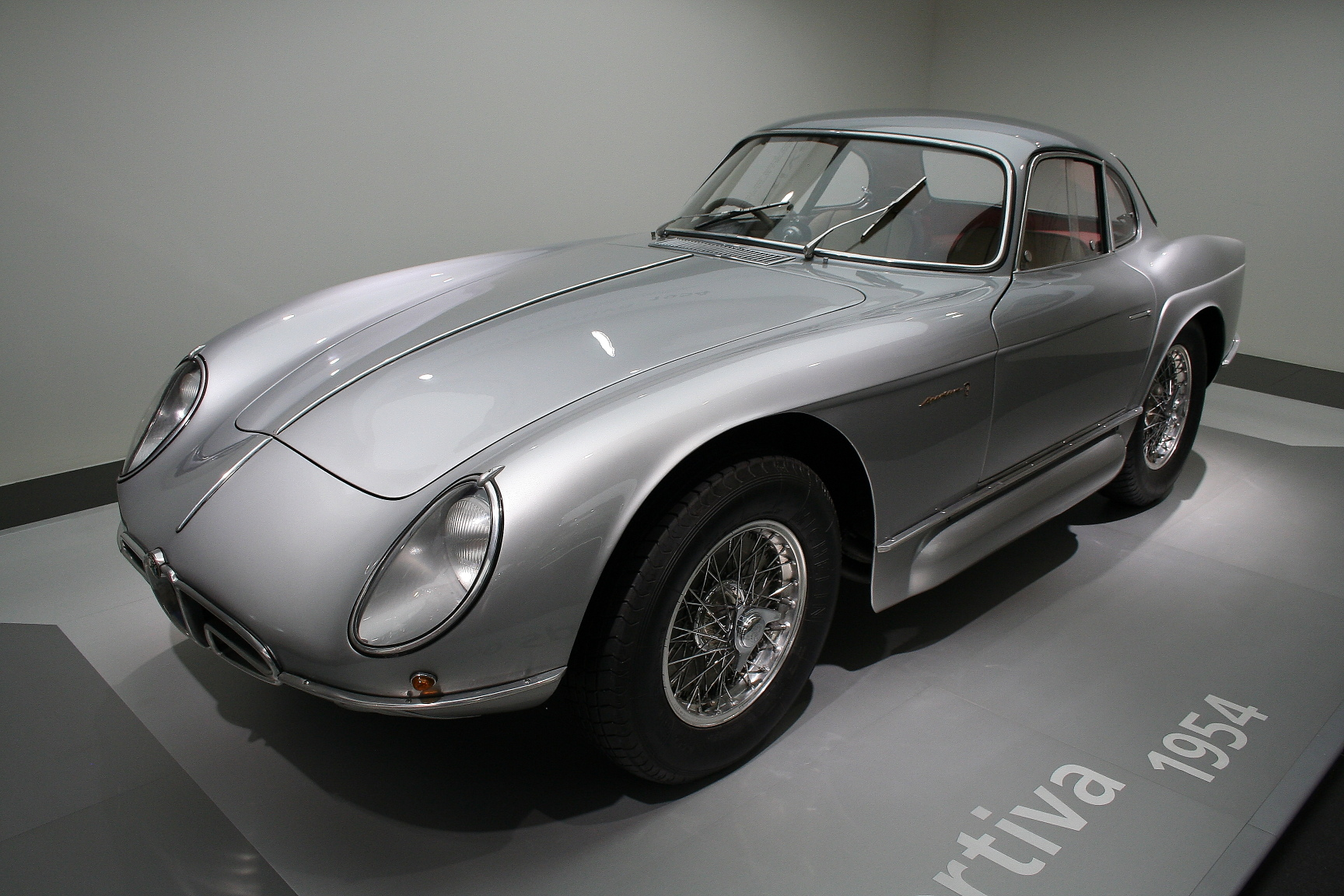

Overview
- Manufacturer: Alfa Romeo
- Also called: Alfa Romeo 1900 Sport Spider
- Production: 1954 (4 produced)
- Designer: Franco Scaglione at Bertone

Body and chassis
- Class: Sports car
- Body style: 2-door coupé 2-door Spider
- Layout: Front mid-engine, rear-wheel-drive
- Related: Alfa Romeo 1900

Powertrain
- Engine: 2.0 L I4
- Transmission: 5-speed manual

Dimensions
- Wheelbase: 2,200 mm (86.6 in)
- Length: 3,600 mm (141.7 in)
- Width: 1,540 mm (60.6 in)
- Height: 1,120 mm (44.1 in)
- Kerb weight: 915 kg (2,017 lb)

The Alfa Romeo 2000 Sportiva is a 2-litre sports car made by Italian car manufacturer Alfa Romeo in 1954. Although developed to be built in a small series, just four were made — two coupés and two spiders.

== History ==
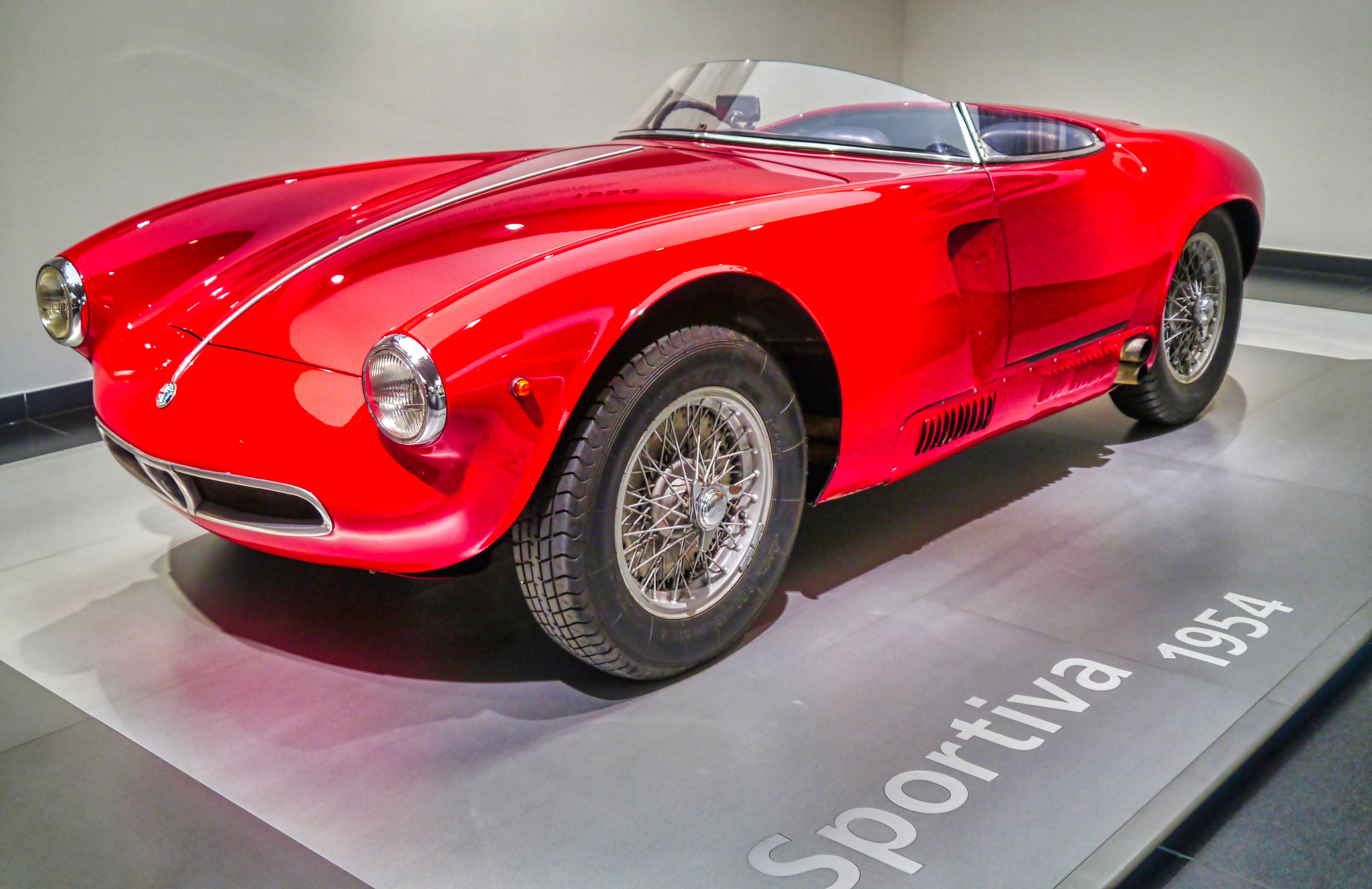
Alfa Romeo 1900 Sport Spider, or 2000 Sportiva Spider

The 2000 Sportiva was intended to be produced in limited volumes for Alfa Romeo's more sporting clientele, and to be used as a high-speed grand tourer or for racing in the sport class. The car never made it into series production: only four were built, two open-top spiders (also known as Alfa Romeo 1900 Sport Spider) and two 2-seat coupés. Both bodies were designed by Franco Scaglione at Bertone. Today a metallic silver coupé and a red spider are part of the Alfa Romeo Museum collection.

Some traits of the coupé, such as the wrap-around rear window and rear end treatment, were later seen on the mass-produced Alfa Romeo Giulietta Sprint, also by Bertone.

== Specifications ==
Like the earlier Disco Volante, the 2000 Sportiva uses a tubular space frame chassis covered by an all-aluminium body, and a front mid-engine, rear-wheel-drive layout. Front suspension was by double wishbones, while at the rear there was a De Dion axle. Brakes were diagonally finned drums, the rears mounted inboard.

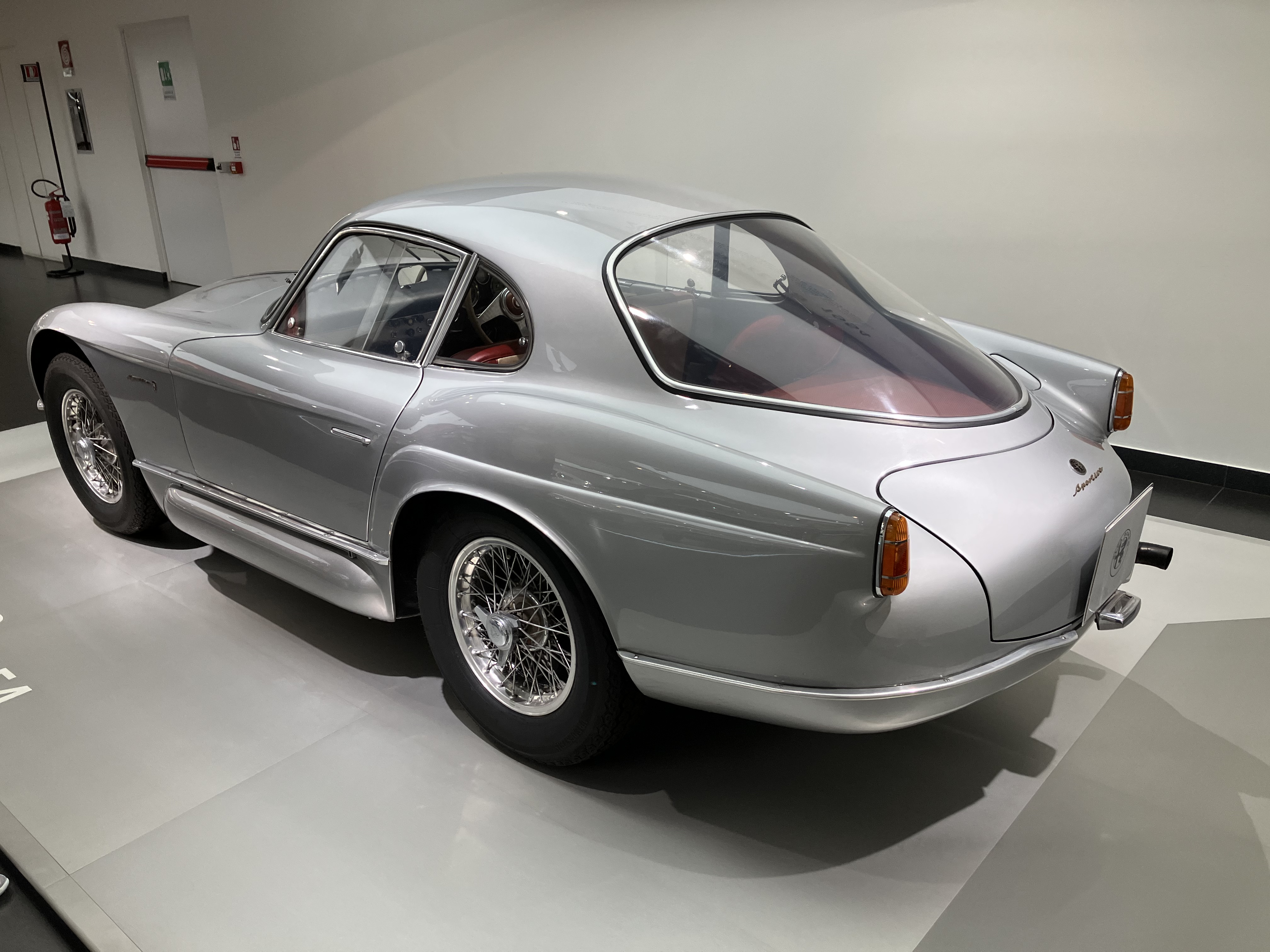
Rear view of the 2000 Sportiva at the Alfa Romeo Museum

The engine was a dual overhead camshaft 1997.4 cc (bore 85 mm, stroke 88 mm) inline-four, with a cast iron block, aluminium cylinder head, and hemispherical combustion chambers. Fed by two twin-choke side-draft Weber carburettors, it produced 138 PS (101 kW; 136 hp) at 6,500 rpm, giving the car a top speed of 220 km/h (137 mph). The transmission was a 5-speed gearbox.

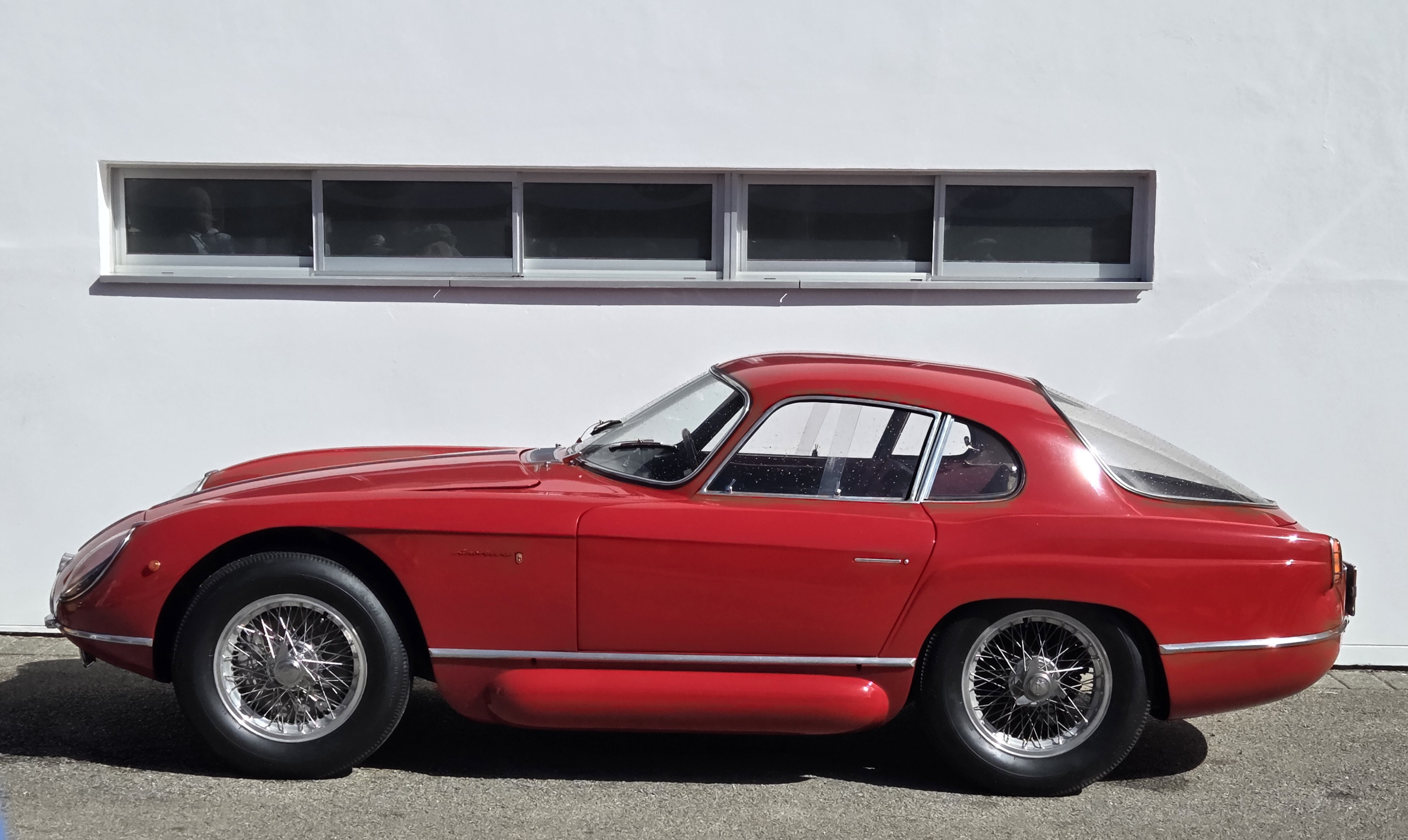
A red one seen at Goodwood Revival in 2025

== Bibliography ==
- Fusi, Luigi (1978). Alfa Romeo—Tutte le vetture dal 1910—All cars from 1910 (3rd ed.). Milan: Emmeti Grafica editrice. pp. 503–506.
