= Ferrari-Abarth 166 MM/53 =

The Ferrari-Abarth 166 MM/53, also called Smontabile Spider, is a competition car designed in 1953 by Carlo Abarth for the driver Giulio Musitelli. Its bodywork was a design of Franco Scaglione. The car is a reworking of the Ferrari 166 MM for the driver, the only Abarth reworking of a Ferrari.

== History ==
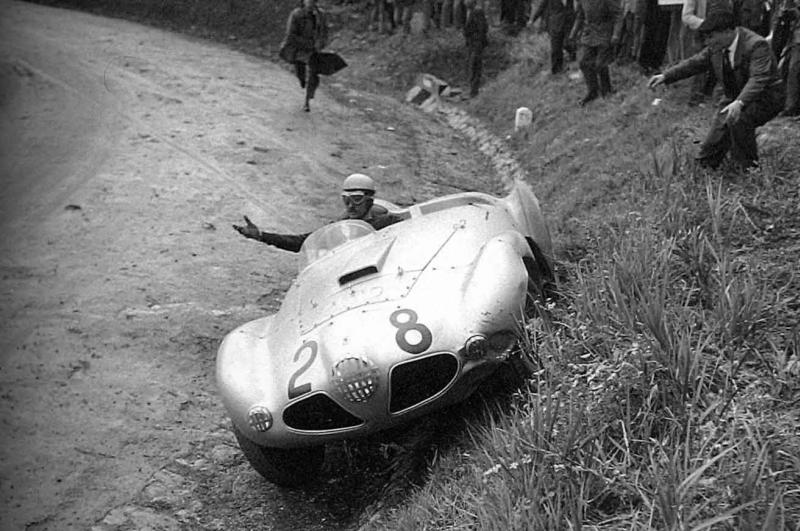
Giulio Musitelli during 1953 Targa Florio in Ferrari-Abarth 166 MM/53

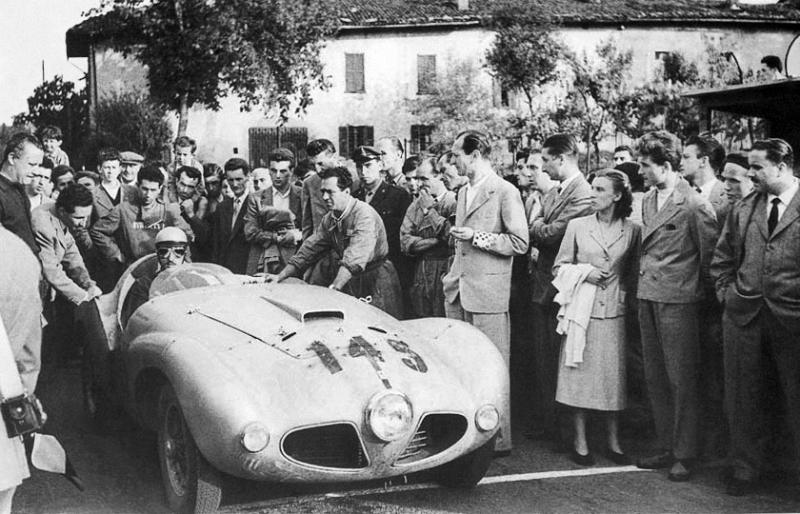
Ferrari-Abarth 166 MM/53 at the 1953 Varese-Campo dei Fiori hillclimb driven by Musitelli

Completed on March 14, 1953, the car is a reworking of Giulio Musitelli's Ferrari 166 MM, chassis number 0262M. His first race dates back to May 14, 1953, the car competed with the number 28 in the Guastalla Scuderia at the XXXVII Targa Florio, driven by Giulio Musitelli and placed 21st out of 45 cars and 22 arrivals. On 26 July of the same year he took part in the 10-hour night in Messina, where he was led by Eugenio Castellotti and Musitelli came in first place, the best position he achieved during his career. On 3 January 1954, during the XIII Grande Prêmio da Cidade de Rio de Janeiro, the car driven by Giulio Musitelli took second place. The last race carried out by the car with the Abarth body was the XXI edition of the Mille Miglia of 2 May 1954, which however was not completed, the car carried the number 608. After this event, probably due to the lack of spare parts, the body was replaced with one made by Carrozzeria Scaglietti. The car was then taken to the United States of America in 1955 by Luigi Chinetti who sold it to Gary Laughlin, who led it in the Palm Springs Preliminaries on December 3, 1955, finishing in fourth place. L'auto fu poi venduta nel 1956 a Lorin McMullen facendola gareggiare altre sei volte The car was then sold in 1979 and in the 2000s the Scaglietti body was again replaced with the original Abarth and the car was sold in 2007 during an RM Auctions auction, now RM Sotheby's, for $850000 and today is put on display.
