= Alfa Romeo BAT =

Series of concept cars designed by Bertone in collaboration with Alfa Romeo

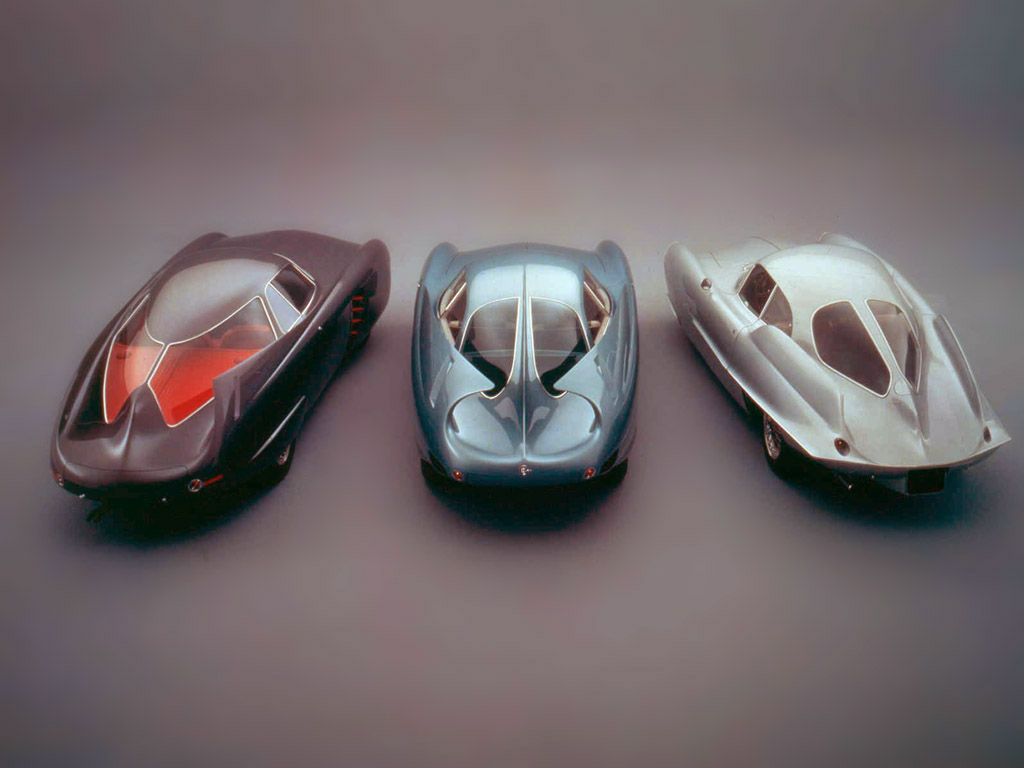
The three original BAT cars. From left: BAT 5, BAT 7, BAT 9

The Alfa Romeo BAT (or Berlina Aerodinamica Tecnica) are a series of Italian concept cars. The cars originated from a joint collaboration project between Alfa Romeo and the Italian design house Bertone that began in 1953. Three cars were built: the BAT 5 in 1953, the BAT 7 in 1954, and finally the BAT 9 in 1955. All three cars were designed by Franco Scaglione.

== History ==
Alfa Romeo contacted Nuccio Bertone of the Bertone design house and commissioned three concept vehicles to research the effects of drag on a vehicle. The idea was to create vehicles with the lowest possible drag coefficient. They were built upon the Alfa Romeo 1900 chassis. Each of the three cars was presented at the Turin Auto Show, in 1953, 1954 and 1955 respectively.

The lowest of the three cars' drag coefficient was the BAT 7, at 0.19, which is considered an achievement even by modern standards. For each of the cars, Alfa Romeo provided a five-speed gearbox and a powerful four-cylinder engine that produced more than 90 horsepower (67 kW), enough to propel the car to a top speed of 125 mph (201 km/h).

All three original BATs have been restored. They make appearances at car shows such as the Concorso Italiano and Pebble Beach Concours d'Elegance. The cars were on display at the Blackhawk Museum in Danville, CA, from 2005 until July 2017. In 2020, RM Sotheby's sold all three cars as one lot at their auction for US$14.840 million, including buyer's fee.

== BAT 5 ==
The BAT 5 was the first of the Bertone-Alfa Romeo BAT project. It was first shown at the Turin Auto Show in 1953. The design of the model aimed to maximize aerodynamics. The shape of the front aims to eliminate the problem of airflow disruption at high speeds, with Scaglione quoted as saying “The entry form must give a smooth penetration,”. For this reason, the headlights were retractable, hidden behind covers which opened sideways, and the car lacked separate bumpers. The design also aimed to achieve a structure which would create the fewest possible air vortices, as well as do away with any extra resistance generated by the wheels by enclosing the wheelwells. In practice, these criteria would allow the car to reach 200 km/h (124 mph) with the 100 hp (75 kW) engine mounted as standard. The design that Bertone came up with was for an extremely light car (roughly 1,100 kg (2,400 lb)), with side windows at a 45-degree angle with respect to the body of the car and a large windscreen which blends in with the almost flat roof. The rear windscreen is divided lengthwise by a slim pillar, and flanked by two fins tapering upwards and slightly inwards. The car had a drag coefficient of 0.23.

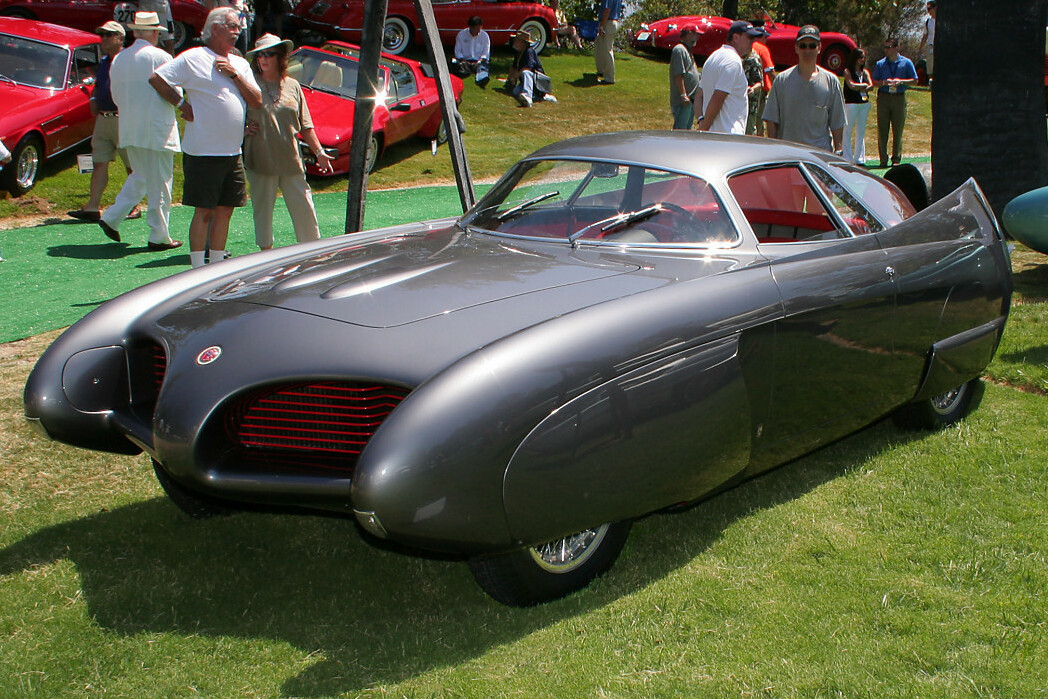
1953 Alfa Romeo BAT 5

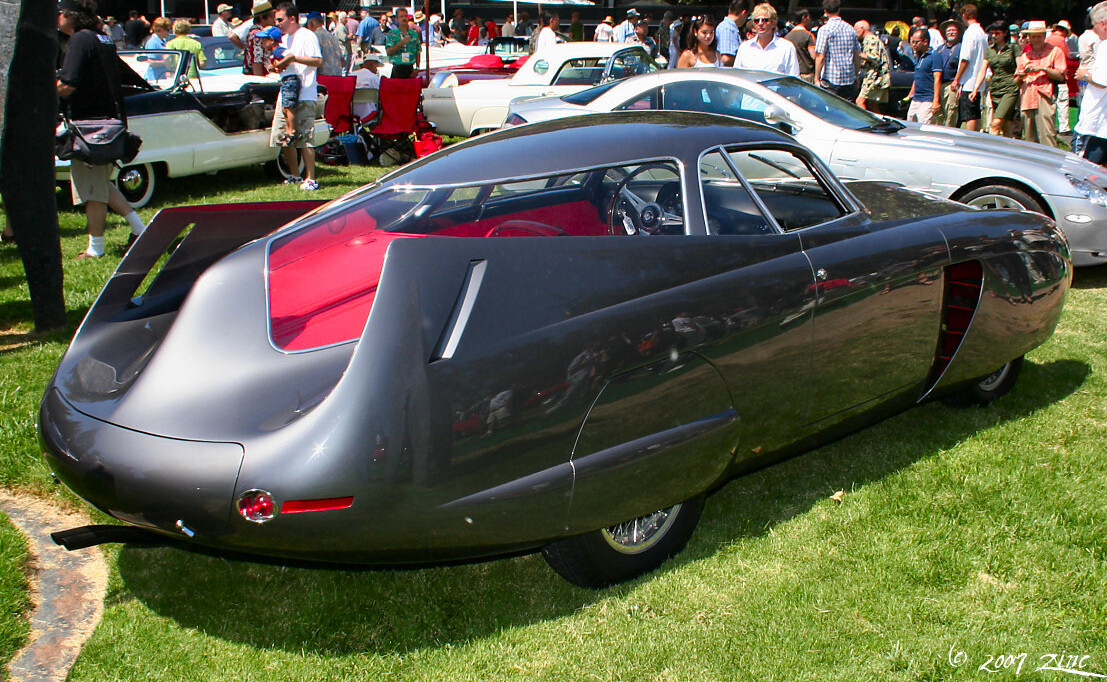
Rear ¾ view

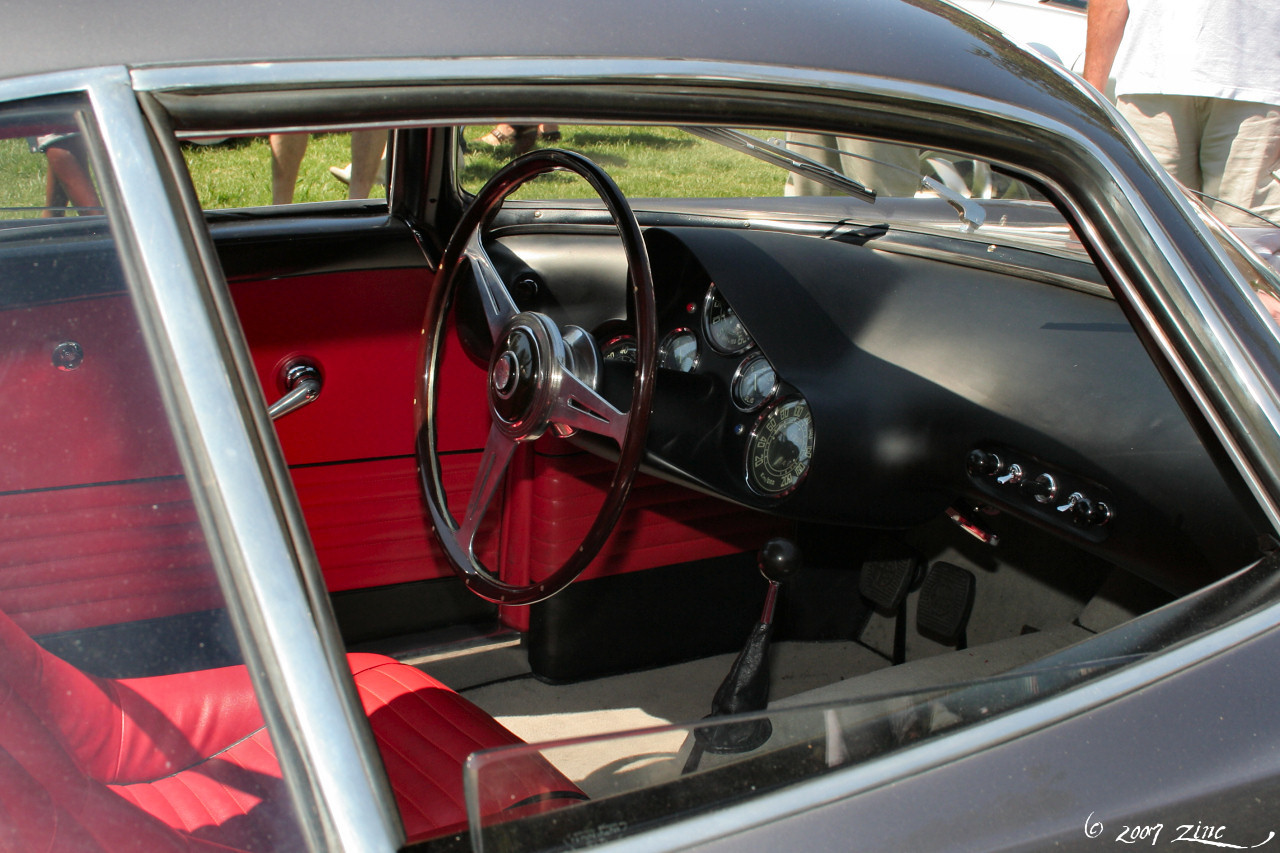
Interior

== BAT 7 ==
The second BAT was shown at the Turin Auto Show in 1954, a year after the BAT 5. For this design (as for the other BAT models, though less evidently), Bertone added elements from his experience working on wing profiles in the aeronautical industry. The result was the shape of the large, curved tail fins. Reportedly, due to the BAT 5's success the prior year, Scaglione was encouraged to emphasize various characteristics of the original.

The nose was lower than that of the BAT 5, and the protrusions where the headlights would normally be stuck out even further. The headlights were located next to the nose and moved down when in use, and the exhaust was integrated into the rear bodywork. The car also featured rear-hinged suicide doors. The drag coefficient of the BAT 7 is 0.19, the lowest of the three BAT cars. Weight was also reduced to roughly 1,000 kg (2,200 lb).

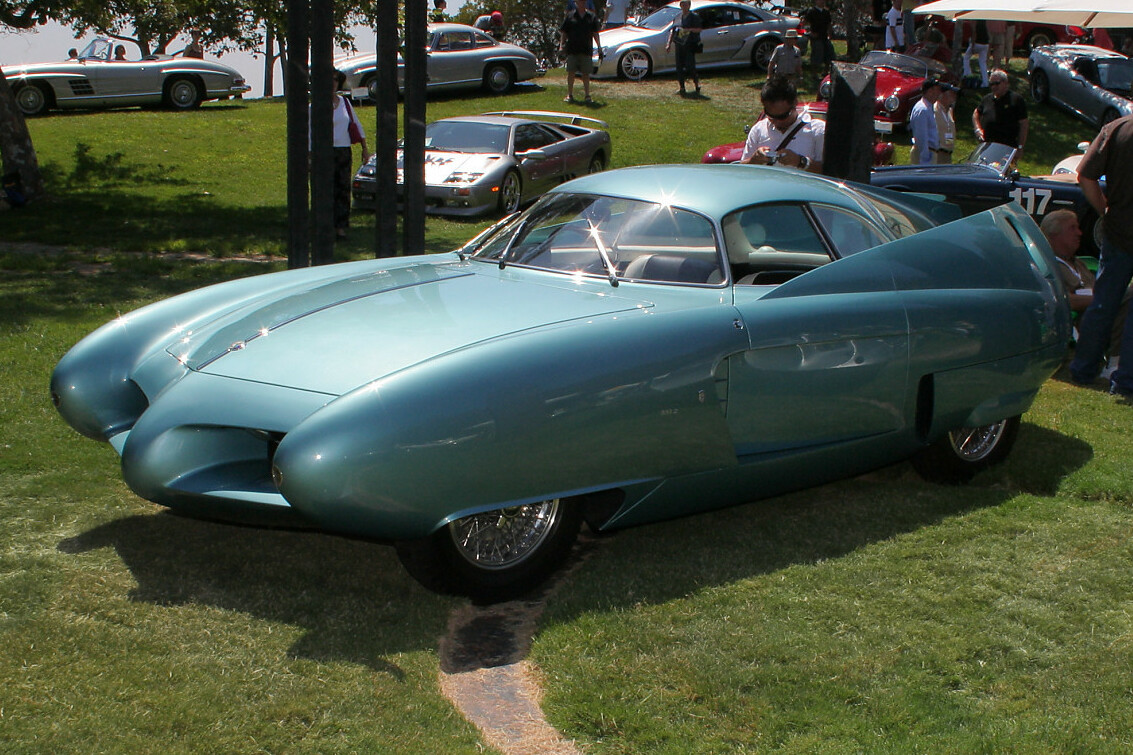
1954 Alfa Romeo BAT 7

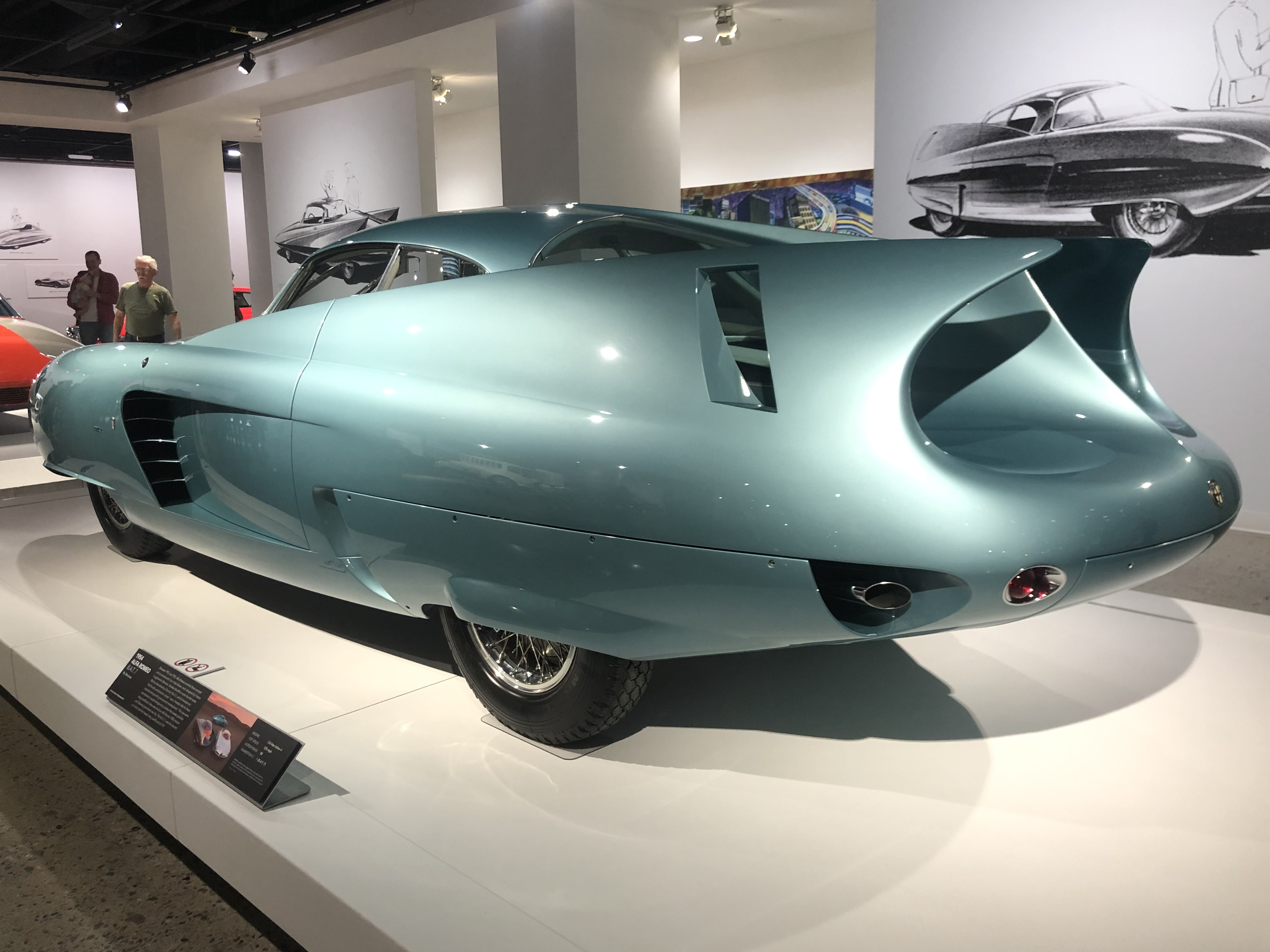
Rear ¾ view

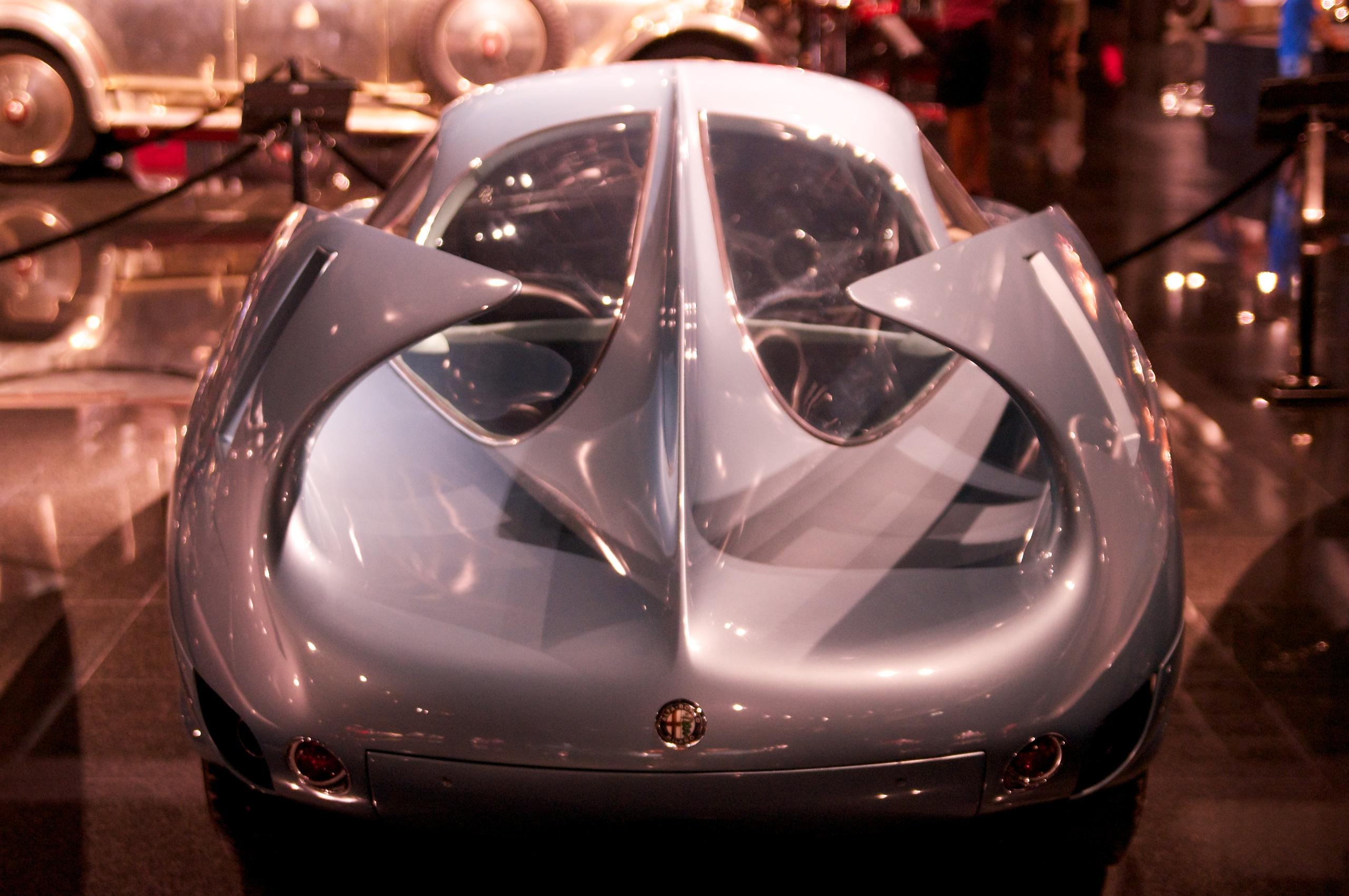
Rear view

== BAT 9 ==
The third BAT was shown at the Turin Auto Show of 1955, the BAT 9 (also known as BAT 9d). It was made to look more like the then current Alfa Romeo models than the other BATs.

The BAT 9 did away with the marked wing lines of the previous models in favour of a cleaner, more sober line. The tail fins, which in the other two models had a real wing-like look, were sized down into two small metal plates, much like the tail fins in production on American and some European cars of the time.

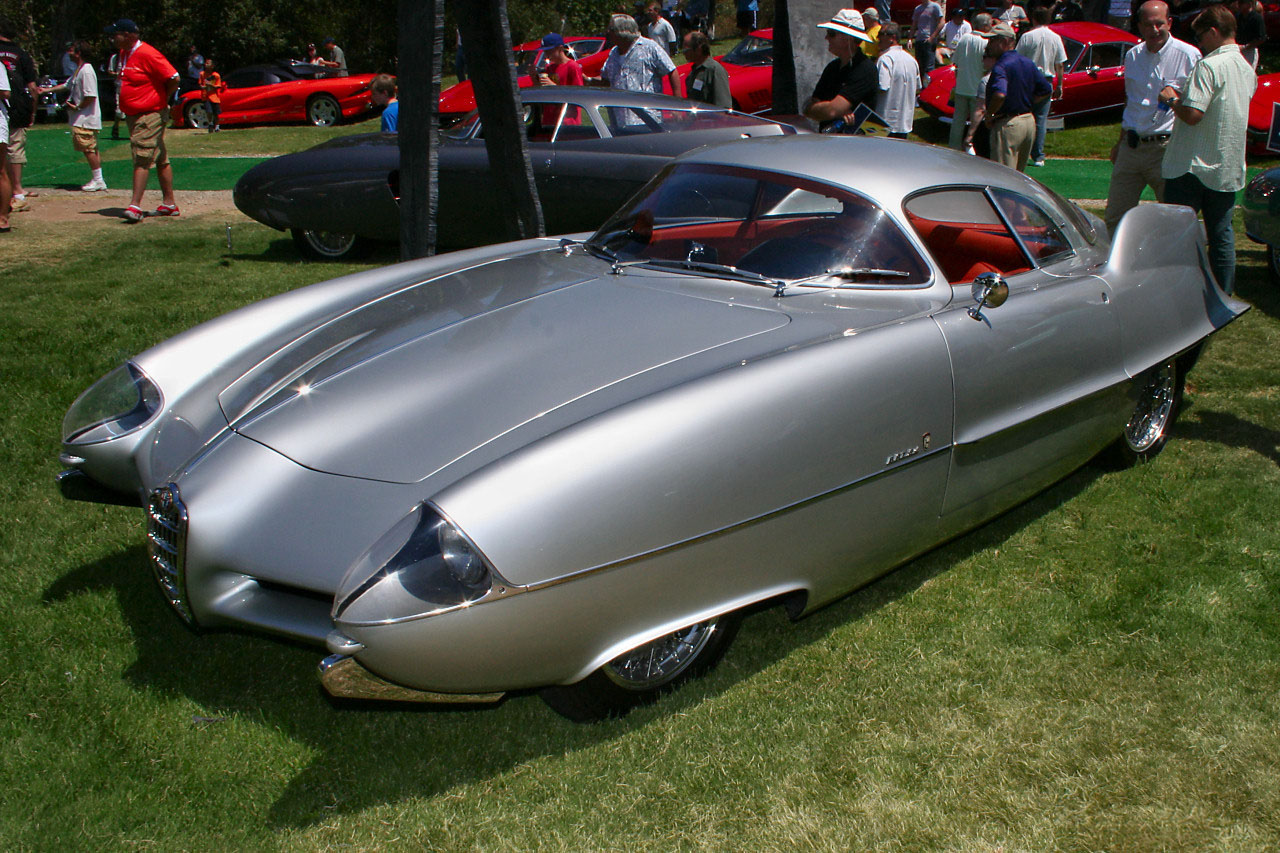
1955 Alfa Romeo BAT 9

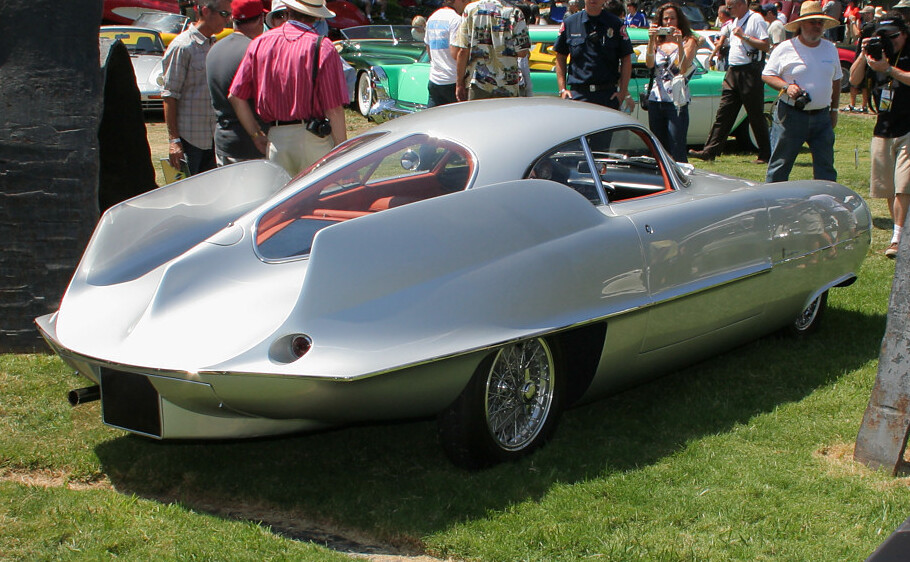
Rear ¾ view

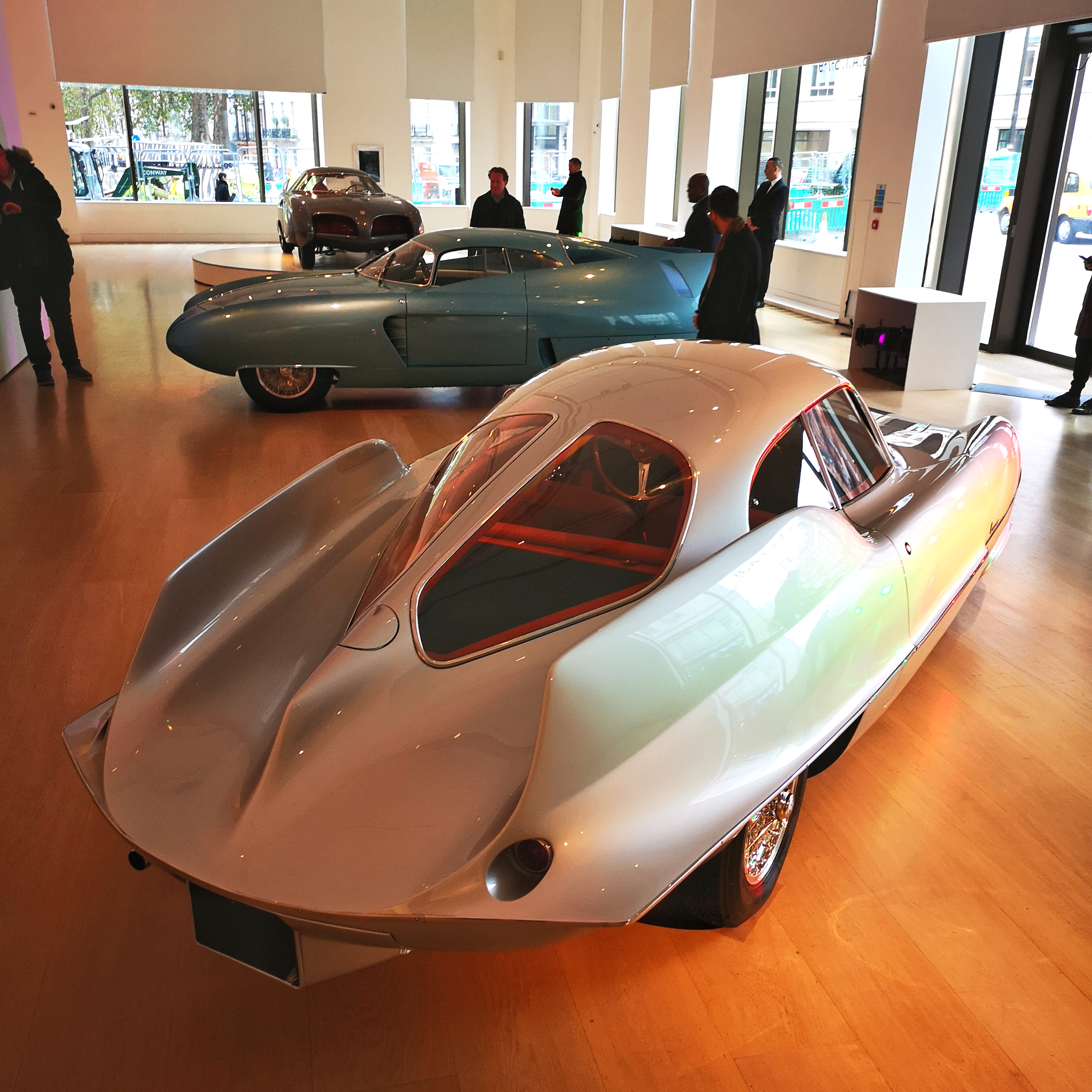
Alfa Romeo BAT 9 on display with the other BAT cars in Berkeley Square, London

== BAT 11 ==
In 2008, after more than 50 years, Alfa Romeo and Bertone showed a new BAT concept. The BAT 11 made its début in Geneva, at the time of the 2008 Geneva Motor Show, though not at the show itself. The new BAT 11, based on the Alfa Romeo 8C Competizione, shares many styling cues with the classic BAT cars of the 1950s. It was designed by David Wilkie.

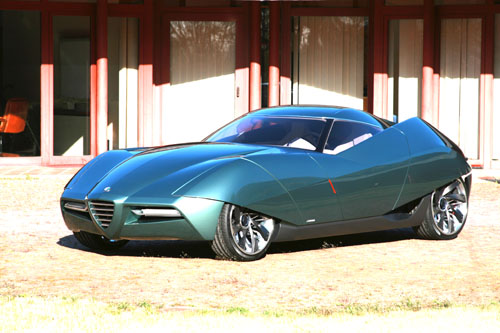
2008 Alfa Romeo BAT 11

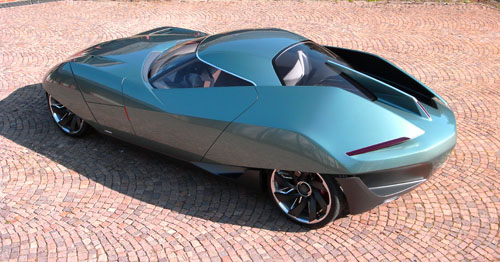
Rear ¾ view

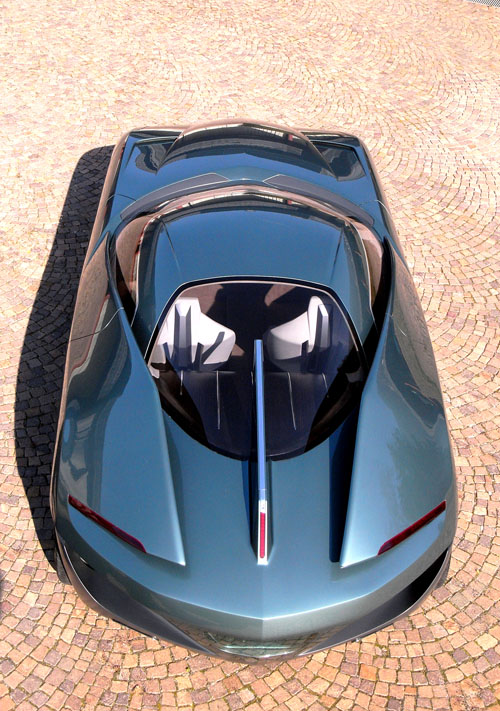
Rear view from above
