= Bertone Pirana =

Concept car designed by Bertone

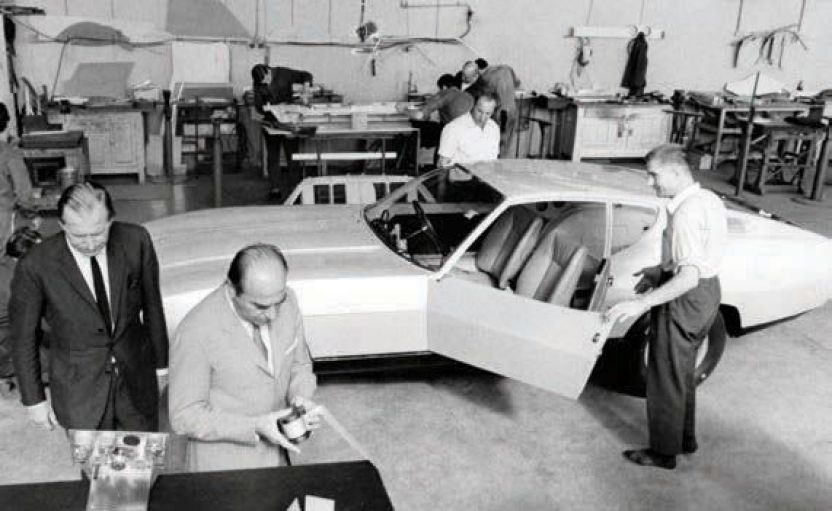

Overview
- Type: Concept car
- Also called: Jaguar Pirana
- Production: 1967; 1 built
- Designer: Marcello Gandini at Bertone

Body and chassis
- Layout: FR layout
- Related: Jaguar E-Type

Powertrain
- Engine: 4.2 L XK I6

The Bertone Pirana (or Jaguar Pirana) is a concept car created by Bertone for the 1967 London Motor Show at Earl's Court. The sleek GT car was based on the chassis and powertrain of the 4.2 litre Jaguar E-type, with a unique steel semi-monocoque body and luxurious interior. It was officially named "Pirana," not "Piranha" as some sources describe, although the badge on the rear of the car reads Piranha. This spelling was reportedly an aesthetic choice. The Pirana was designed by Marcello Gandini, perhaps best known for styling the Lamborghini Countach. Unusually for a show car, the Pirana was commissioned by The Daily Telegraph, a leading British daily newspaper, as an example of an "ideal car." Sir William Lyons was contacted beforehand about the project and agreed to sell Bertone the Jaguar engine and chassis. The car was originally registered "TGF 1F". After a successful showing at the London Motor show, the Pirana was subsequently exhibited at the New York car show and then at the British Motor Show in Montreal. The car was later converted to a 2+2 seater arrangement and the transmission changed from manual to automatic. The space for the plus 2 seats being made by moving the air conditioning unit to the rear luggage space.

The Pirana, along with the Lamborghini Marzal, influenced Gandini's design of the Lamborghini Espada. The Espada was introduced in 1968, one year after the Pirana. The wooden body buck built for the Pirana was used in the construction of an early Espada prototype.
