= Amicale Citroën Internationale =

The Amicale Citroën Internationale (ACI) is the international association of all non-commercial Automobiles Citroën and DS Automobiles car clubs worldwide. Established in the 1980s, the organization was registered in 2004 according to the French Law of 1901 as non-profit organization. The formal headquarter is Paris.

Today, the ACI is represented in 43 countries, connecting 1.000 non-profit clubs and about 70.000 members worldwide. The association works in partnership with PSA resp. Its brands are independent from the manufacturers.

Main focus areas are supporting the preservation of the history of Automobiles Citroën and DS Automobiles, and also support the organization of global gatherings of vehicles, e.g. the International Citroën Car Clubs Rally (ICCCR) which takes place every four years.

The Annual General Meeting traditionally is held around February each year in the context of Retromobile, the largest historic vehicle show in France.
