= Lancia Sibilo =

Concept car designed by Bertone

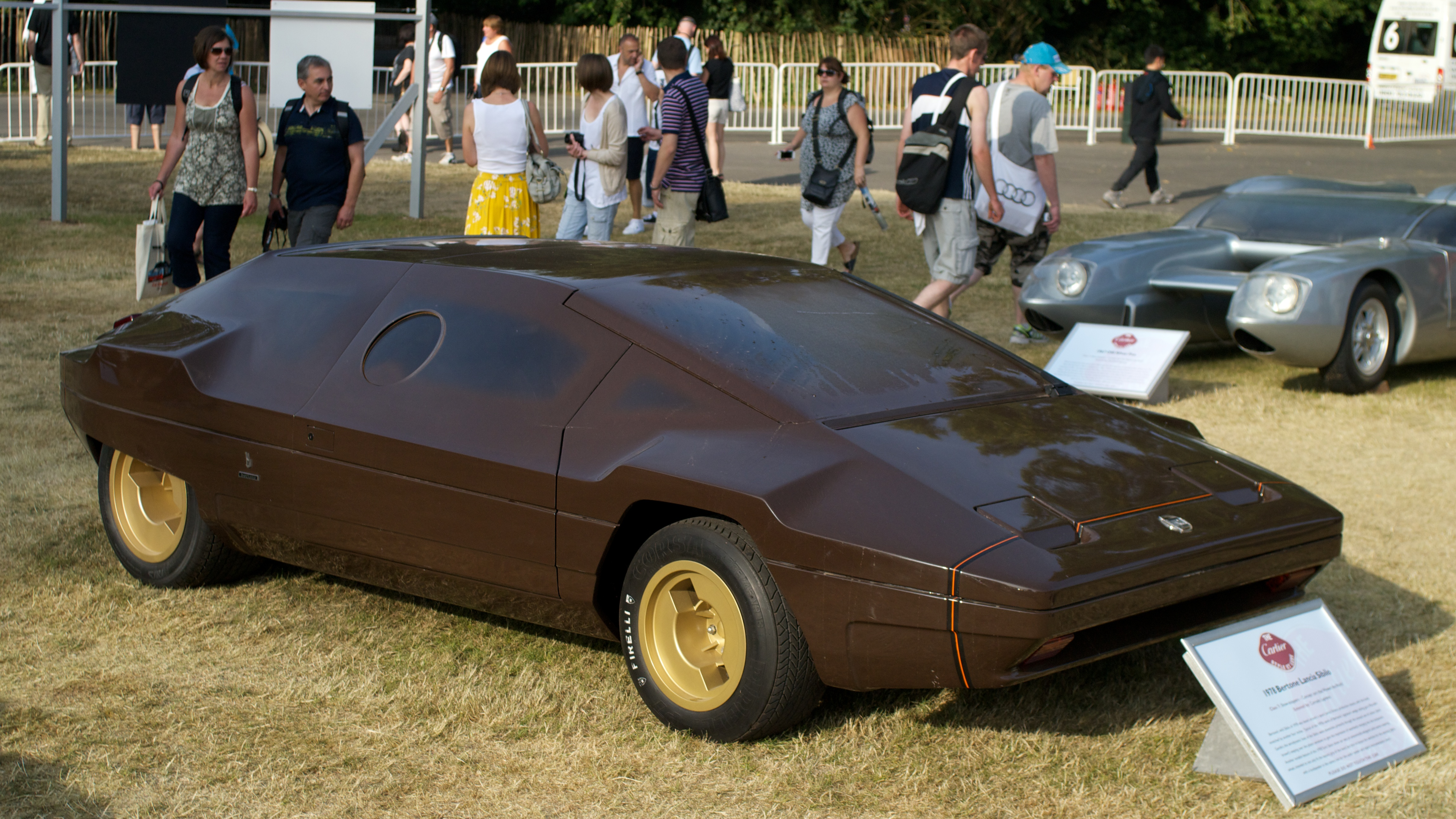
- The Lancia Sibilo at the 2013 Goodwood Festival of Speed

Overview
- Type: Concept car
- Manufacturer: Bertone; Lancia
- Production: 1978; 1 built
- Designer: Marcello Gandini at Bertone

Body and chassis
- Layout: Transverse mid-engine, rear-wheel drive
- Related: Lancia Stratos

Powertrain
- Engine: 2.4 L (2,418 cc (148 cu in)) Dino V6
- Transmission: 5-speed manual

Dimensions
- Wheelbase: 2,280 mm (89.8 in)

The Lancia Sibilo is a 1978 concept car designed and built by Bertone, and based on the production Lancia Stratos, but with the wheelbase lengthened from 2180 to 2280 mm.

The car's main characteristics were its sharp, aerodynamic lines and polycarbonate windows. Like other Bertone concepts of the time, the body is made from hand beaten steel. A small circular portion of the side windows could be moved electrically and a single large windshield wiper vertically swept the windshield. Retractable headlights with circular lenses garnished a sharply raked front end.

Inside, the steering wheel was anatomically designed to fit the natural grip of the hand, and also house switches for the warning lights and a loudspeaker. Digital instrumentation was placed in the middle of the dashboard near the point where the dashboard and the windshield meet, designed to divert the driver's eyes as little as possible from the road.

The vehicle was painted a lighter brown after its debut at the Turin Auto Show in 1978 following feedback regarding its extremely dark brown color. The wheels were also re-painted from bright yellow to light gold, and a Lancia badge was added to the hood.

The Sibilo is powered by the same mechanicals as the Stratos, with a mid mounted 2.4 L Dino V6 and 5-speed manual transmission.

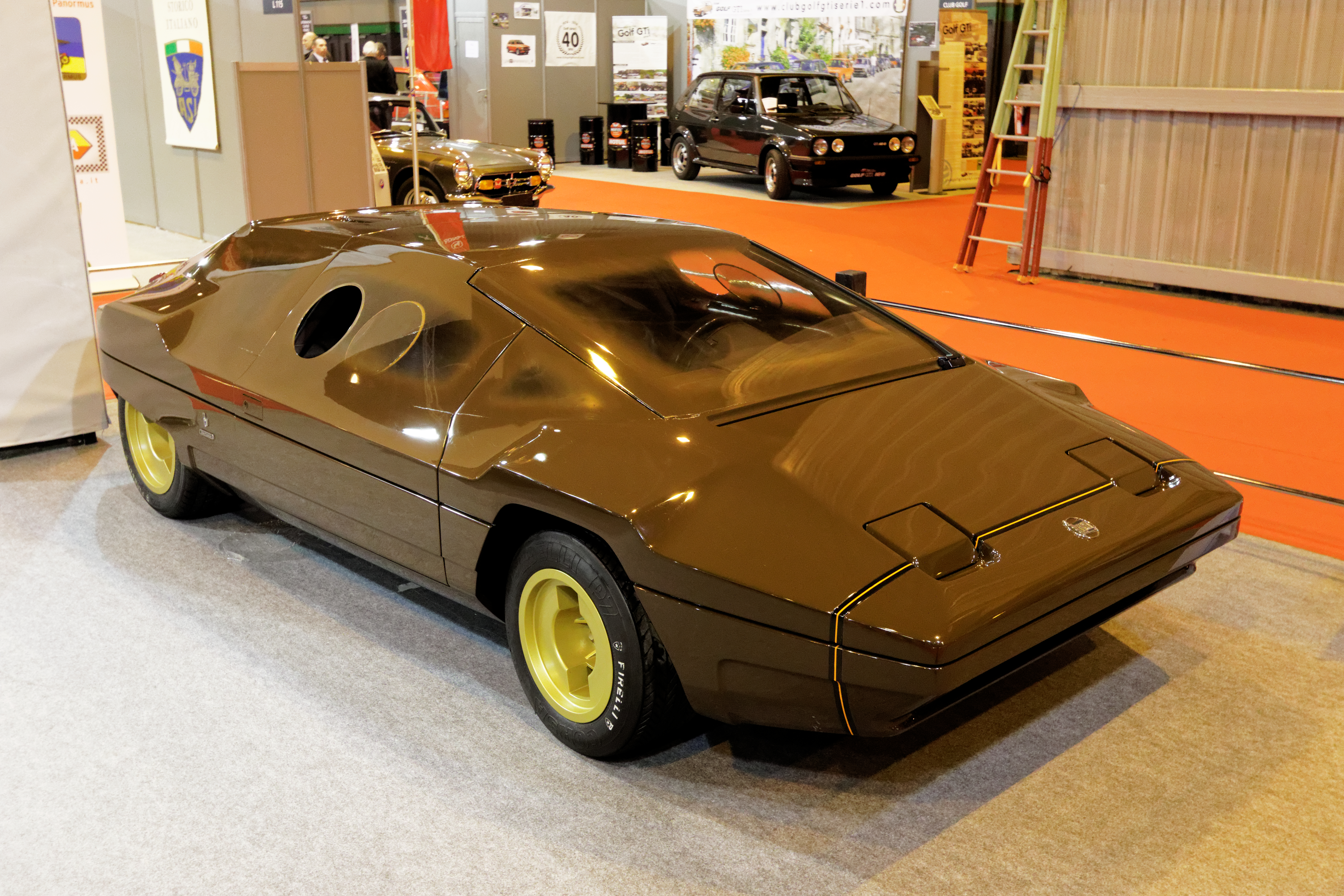
Lancia Sibilo at Rétromobile 2015

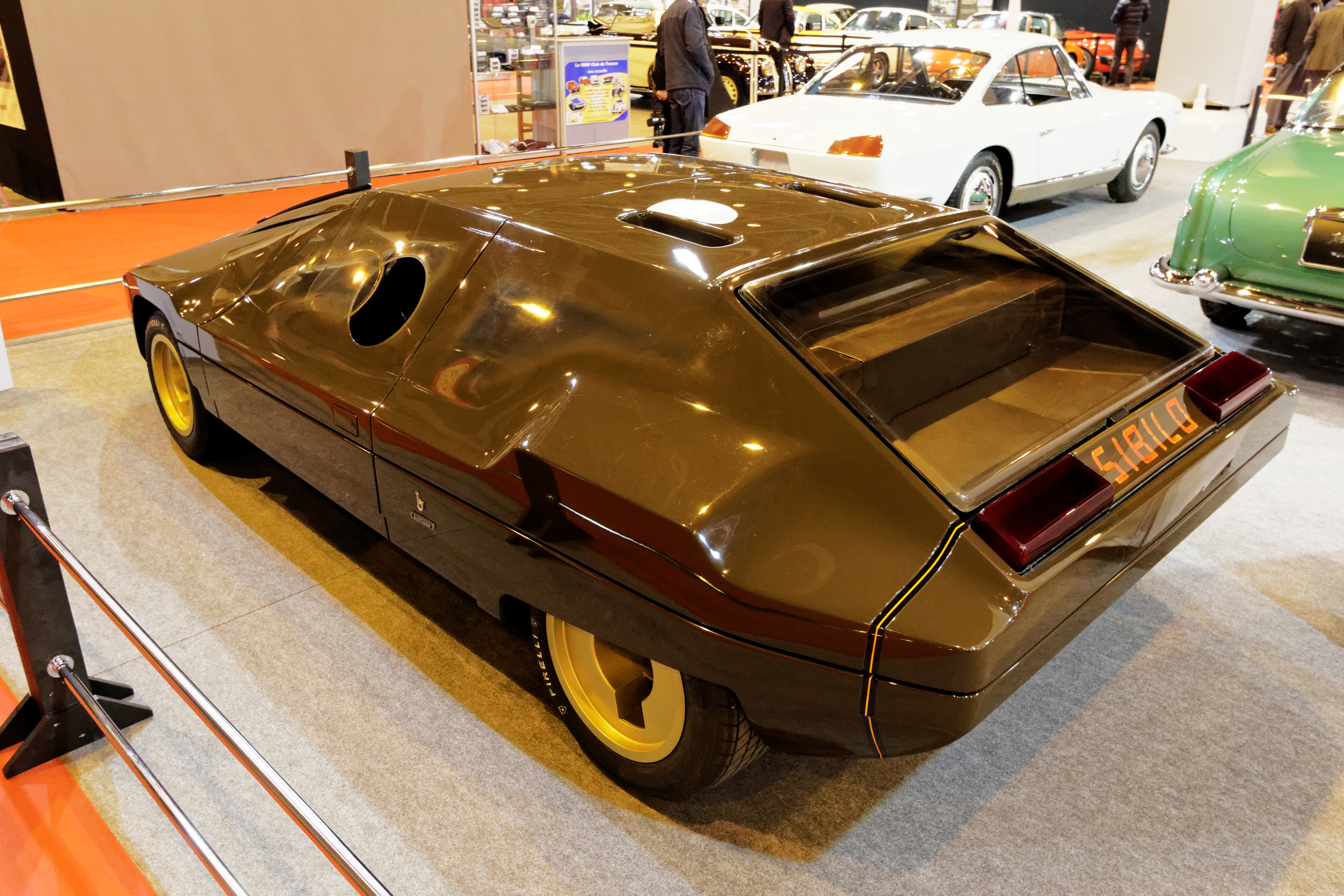

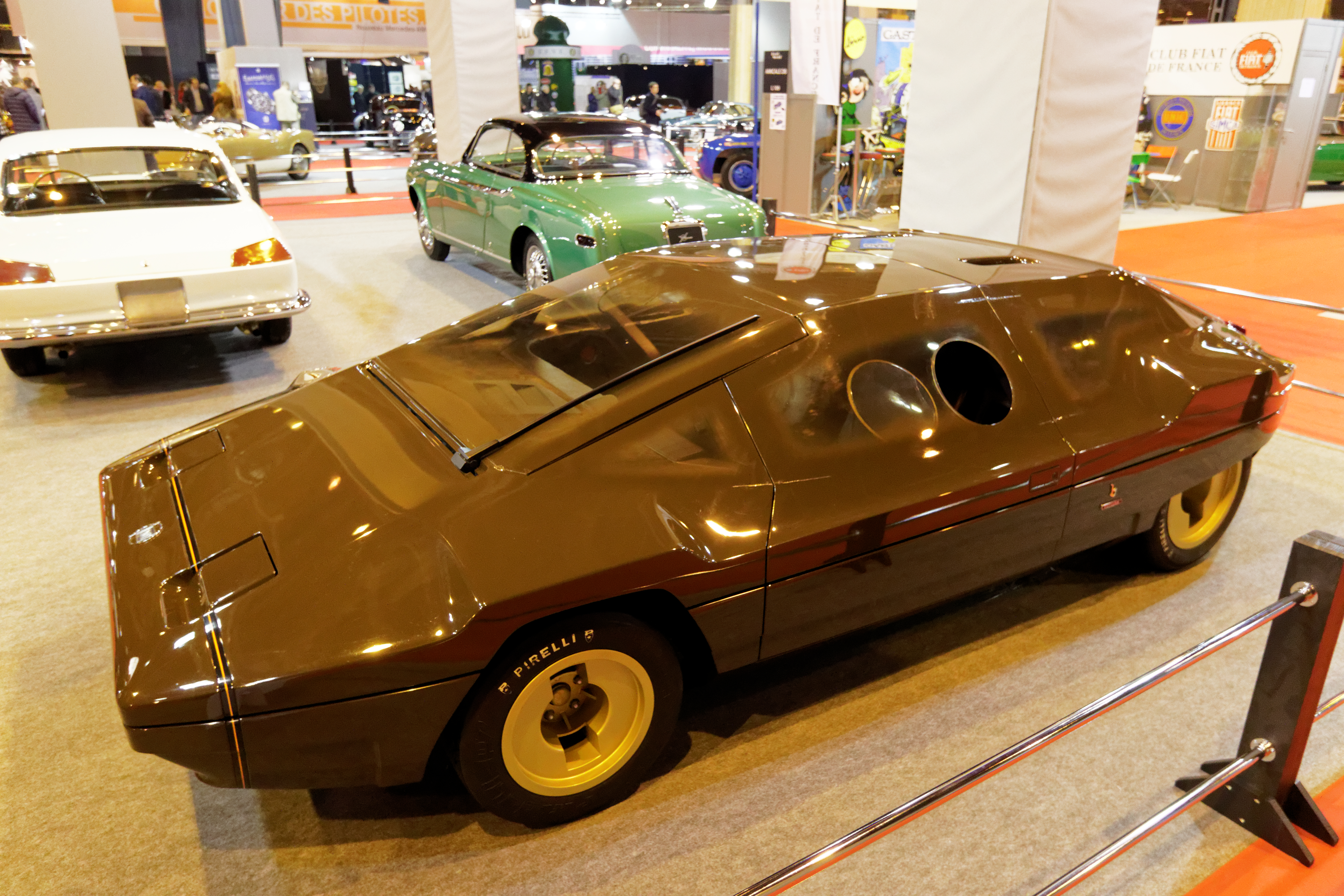
