= Chevrolet Testudo =

Concept car designed by Bertone

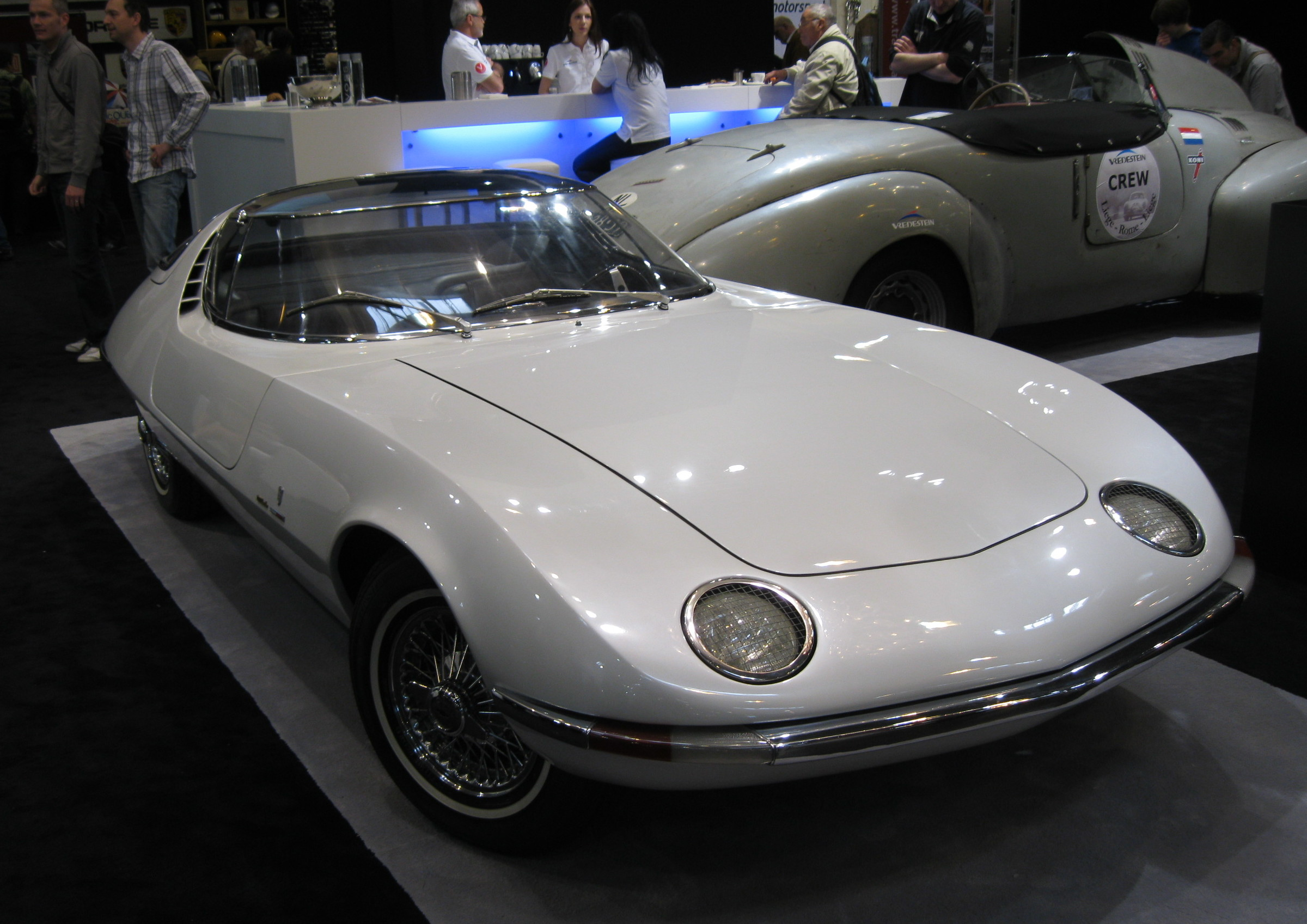
- Chevrolet Testudo

Overview
- Manufacturer: General Motors/Bertone
- Also called: Bertone Corvair Testudo
- Production: 1963
- Designer: Giorgetto Giugiaro at Bertone

Body and chassis
- Class: Concept car
- Body style: Berlinetta
- Layout: RR layout
- Platform: Chevrolet Corvair
- Doors: 1 (hinged canopy)
- Related: Chevrolet Corvair Monza GT

Powertrain
- Engine: 2.4 L (145 cu in) H6
- Transmission: 4-speed manual

Dimensions
- Wheelbase: 94.5 in (2,400 mm)
- Length: 169.3 in (4,300 mm)
- Width: 67.7 in (1,720 mm)
- Height: 41.7 in (1,060 mm)
- Curb weight: 1,980 lb (898 kg)

The Chevrolet Testudo is a concept car built by Bertone on a modified Chevrolet Corvair Monza platform. The name comes from the Latin word for "Turtle". The car debuted at the 1963 Geneva Motor Show.

== History ==
General Motors (GM) Vice President of Styling Bill Mitchell wanted to promote Corvair sales in Europe using locally styled versions. At least two major Italian Carrozzeria showed designs for the Corvair using cars believed to have been supplied directly from GM. Pininfarina showed the first iteration of their Corvair Speciale as early as 1960.

In late 1962 a car arrived at Bertone. The Vehicle Identification Number (VIN) attributed to the finished concept - 20927W207657 - indicates that it started out as a 1962 Corvair 900 (Monza) coupe built in the Willow Run plant. At Bertone the Corvair's unibody chassis was shortened, reducing the wheelbase from the 108 in (2,743 mm) of the original Corvair to 94 in (2,400 mm). Extra reinforcement was added.

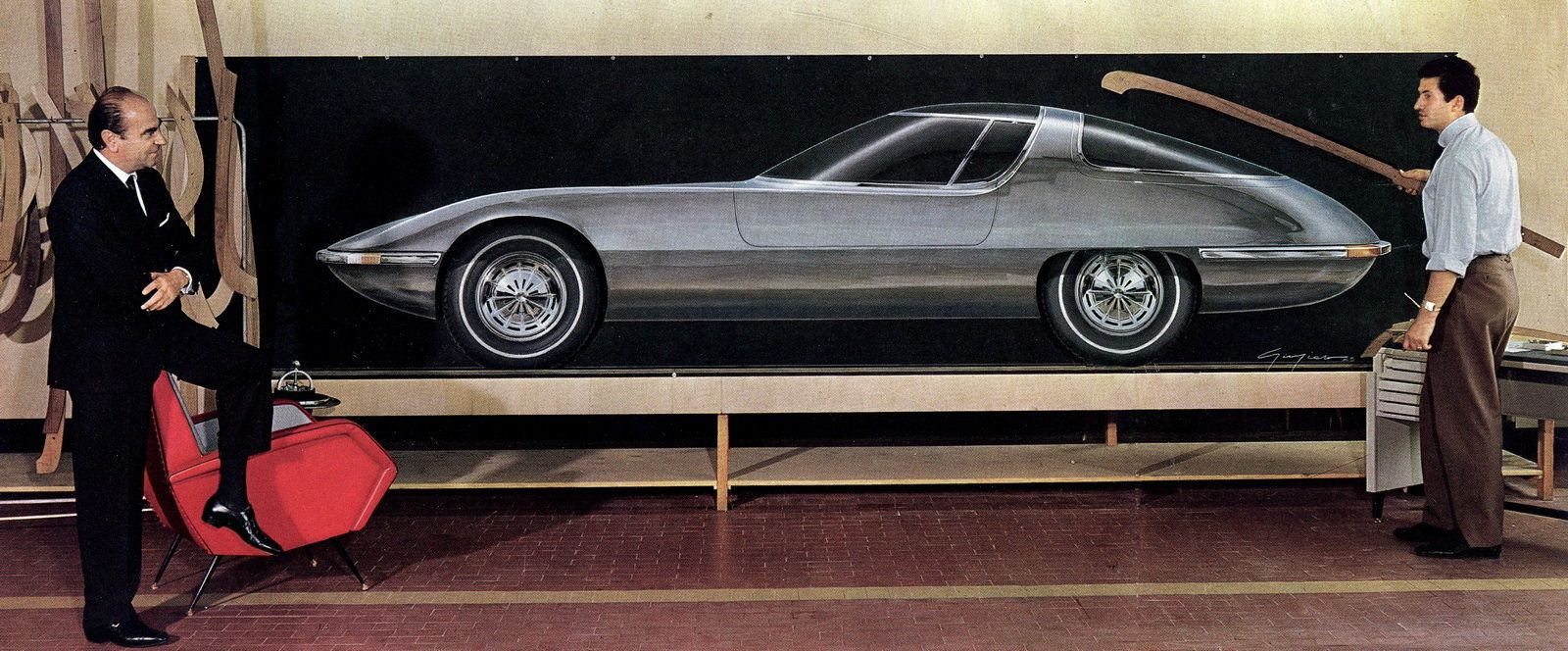
Nuccio Bertone and Giorgetto Giugiaro standing next to a design drawing of the Testudo

The car's design was done by Giorgetto Giugiaro, who was then at Bertone. He said that his goal was to create a shape that merged the two typical views of a car; the plan view and the side elevation. He wanted a shape that was a smooth visual blending of the two. Work on the car was completed in two months.

The Testudo was driven to Geneva by Nuccio Bertone, where it debuted at the 1963 Geneva Motor show. Following the show it was driven back to Turin by Giugiaro.

In 1965 the Testudo was involved in an accident while shooting a promotional film for Shell. This took place on the Parabolica corner on the Monza circuit. The other car involved was also a Bertone concept car; the Alfa Romeo Canguro. The Testudo suffered significant damage, and as Bertone was not willing to divert funds to pay for repairs, the damaged car was left to sit for several years. In 1974 the still-damaged car was offered for sale at an asking price of US$10,000 but remained unsold. It finally underwent a complete restoration in the early 1990s under the direction of Luciano d'Ambrosio, Bertone's new chief designer. The restored Testudo was shown at the 1996 Pebble Beach Concours d'Elegance.

The Testudo influenced later Bertone designs like the Lamborghini Miura, Alfa Romeo Montreal, and Fiat 850 Spider. The Ferrari Daytona of 1968 is said to reference the style of the Testudo. Designer Dick Teague drew inspiration from the Testudo when shaping the 1975 AMC Pacer. Designer Anatole "Tony" Lapine also said that the Testudo influenced his work on the Porsche 928 for 1977.

Giugiaro says it was the first car he was ever given a free hand to design. He asked to have the car when he departed Bertone, but his request was turned down.

Giugiaro revisited the tilting canopy concept in 2018 for the design of the GFG Sibylla. The Testudo appeared together with the Sibylla at the 2018 Geneva Motor Show on March 6.

On 21 May 2011 RM Sotheby's offered the Testudo for sale at the Villa d'Este at Lake Como. The car sold for €336,000.

== Technical features ==
=== Suspension ===
The running gear of the original Corvair was retained. The front suspension comprised an upper A-arm and two-piece lower A-arm with coil springs and hydraulic shock-absorbers mounted to a unitized subframe. An anti-roll bar was fitted at the front. The rear suspension was a swing axle system made up of semi-trailing arms with coil springs and hydraulic shock absorbers mounted to a rear subframe, with drive taken from the transaxle to the wheel hubs through half-shafts that had a universal joint on their inboard ends and a rigid connection at the outboard ends.

=== Engine and transmission ===
Powering the Testudo was the rear-mounted Chevrolet Turbo-Air 6 engine that came with the Corvair. This was an air-cooled six-cylinder horizontally opposed boxer engine with a single camshaft in the block and overhead valves with two valves per cylinder. The cylinder block and heads were aluminum, but the cylinder barrels were iron. Descriptions of the particular engine used in the Testudo range from an 81 hp (60.4 kW) 140 cu in (2.3 L) version to a 144 hp (107.4 kW) 164 cu in (2.7 L) version. The engine code on the car sold by RM Sothebys was "TO213YN". Assuming this was the original engine, that code indicates a 145 cu in (2,376 cc) High Performance Engine (HPE) making 102 hp (76.1 kW) built in the Tonawanda plant on February 13.

The engine code also indicates that the engine was paired with a manual transmission. The transmission in the Testudo was the 4-speed unit with floor shift offered on the Corvair Monza.

=== Body ===
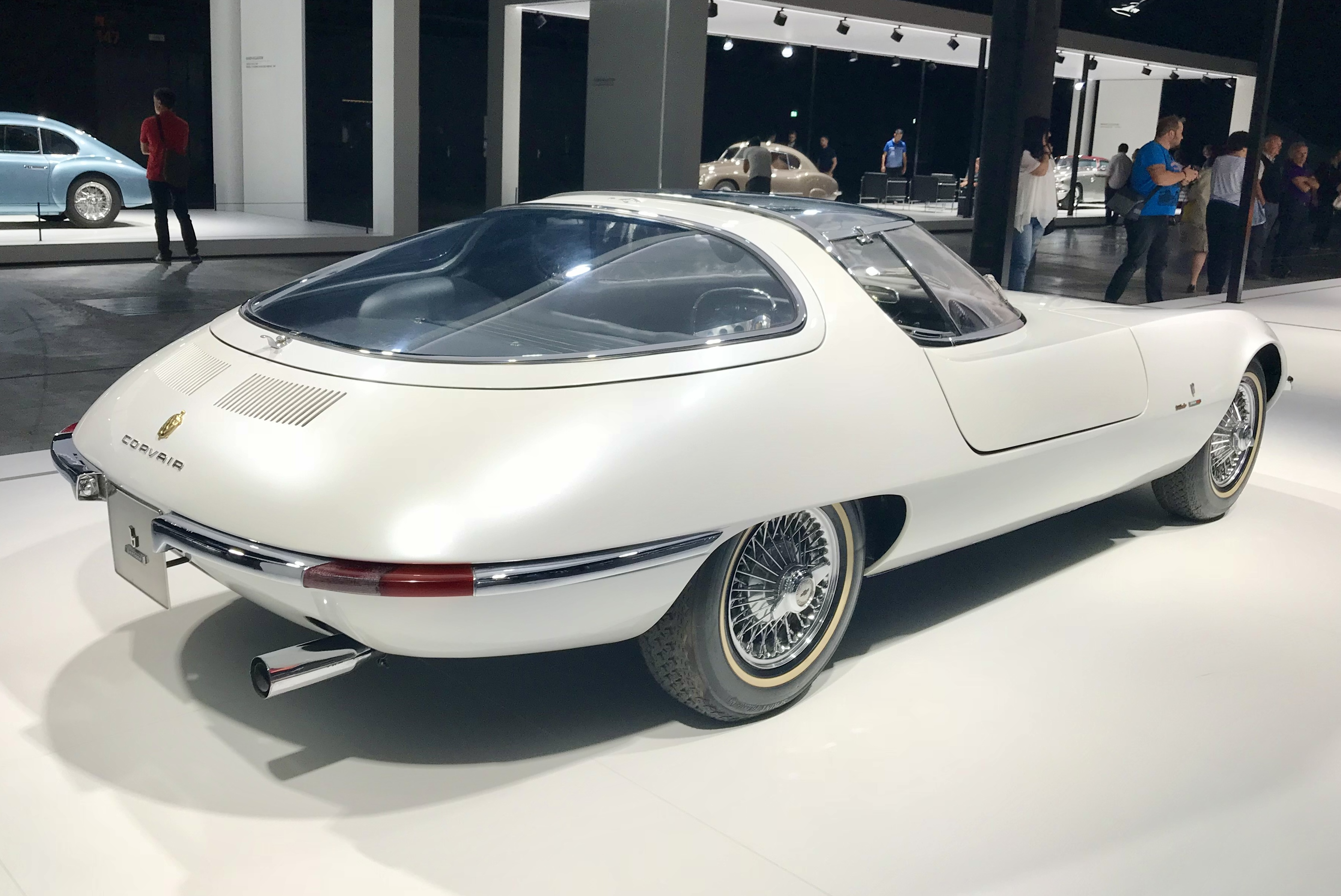
Rear view

The car's shape was that of a long-nosed berlinetta. The bodywork was executed in 0.031 in (0.8 mm) thick steel, with the hood and some other panels of aluminum. Originally painted a metallic silver, it was later changed to pearlescent white. A prominent horizontal body line midway up the side of the car visually divided the body into an upper and lower half. This was evocative of a turtle's shell, and was reflected in the car's name as well as in the turtle emblem on the rear deck.

The interior of the car was accessed through a single, front-hinged canopy with a windscreen of safety glass. The wrap-around canopy did not include A-pillars. The top of the canopy was capped by a roof panel of tinted Plexiglas, and behind that was a large hinged hatch, also with a large curved tinted Plexiglas panel, over the storage compartment. Air intakes for the engine compartment were located on the sides just behind the canopy in what would normally be the leading edges of the B-pillar, a feature that would also be used later on the Miura.

The taillights were made of polycarbonate — the first such application of the material. The lights were integrated into the rear bumper's shape so as to not disrupt the rear body lines. The exposed headlamps rotated up and forward to a vertical position when needed and then folded back flush with the bodywork when not in use, another feature that would appear on the Miura.

=== Interior ===
The interior of the car had two seats. Ahead of the driver was a rectangular steering wheel with rounded corners.

The car's instrument panel was an "L"-shape rotated 180° with the instruments arranged down the long centre leg. Switchgear was placed on the horizontal portion ahead of the driver.
