= Citroën Zabrus =

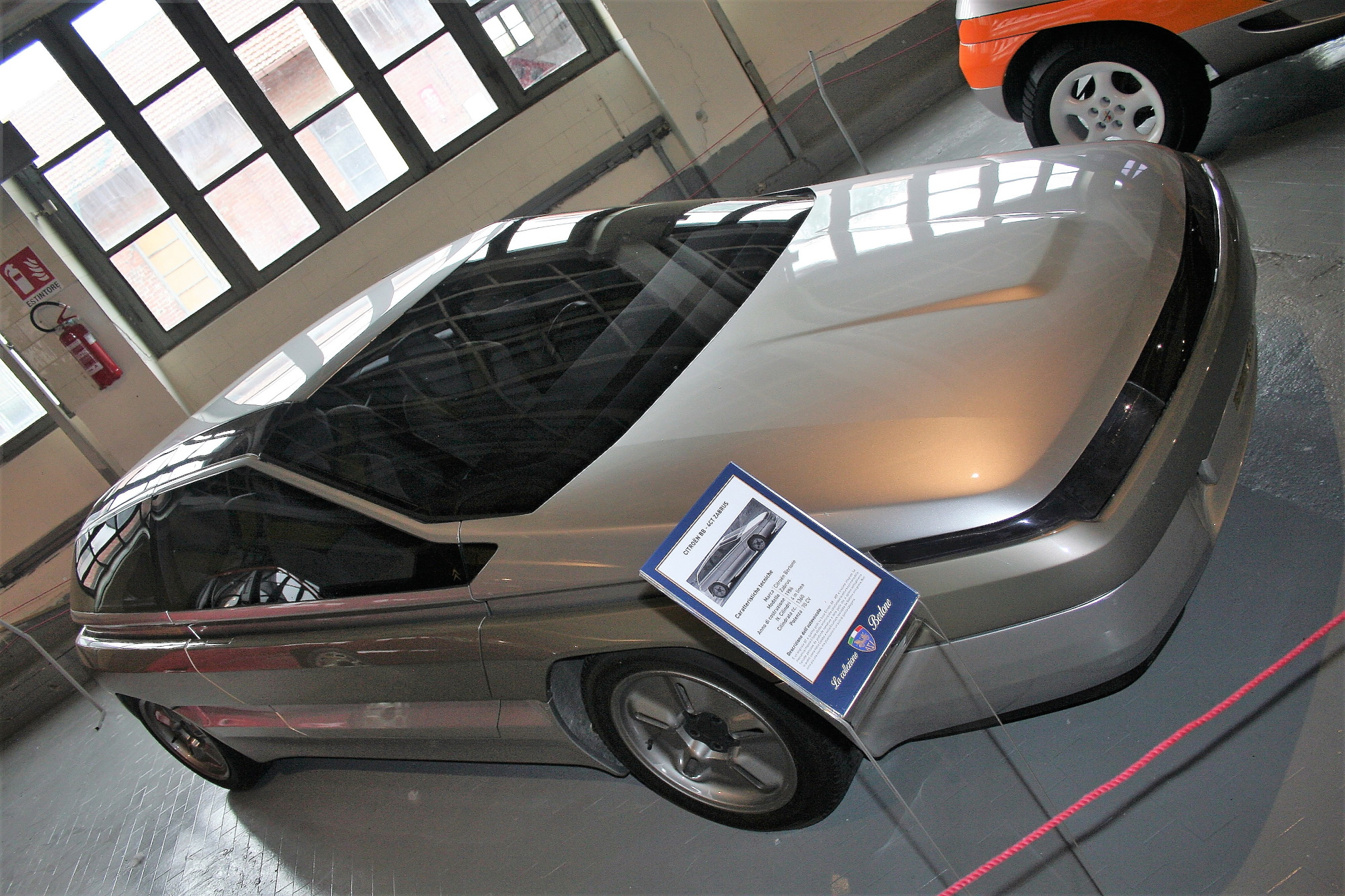

Overview
- Manufacturer: Bertone
- Production: 1986 (Concept car)
- Designer: Marc Deschamps at Bertone

Body and chassis
- Class: Executive car (E)
- Body style: 3 door (2+2) (shooting-brake)
- Layout: Front engine, all wheel drive
- Doors: Scissor
- Related: Citroën BX

Powertrain
- Engine: 2141 cc (turbocharged I4)
- Power output: 147 kW (197 hp; 200 PS)
- Transmission: 5 speed manual

Dimensions
- Wheelbase: 2650 mm (104.3 in)
- Length: 4300 mm (169.3 in)
- Width: 180 mm (74.0 in)
- Height: 1370 mm (53.9 in)

The Citroën Zabrus is a concept car with 3 doors and a 2+2 shooting brake design that was designed by the Italian design studio Bertone. It was based on the mechanics of the Citroën BX 4TC. It was first presented in May 1986 at the Turin Motor Show. The hatchback of the Citroën BX itself was based on a design by Bertone.

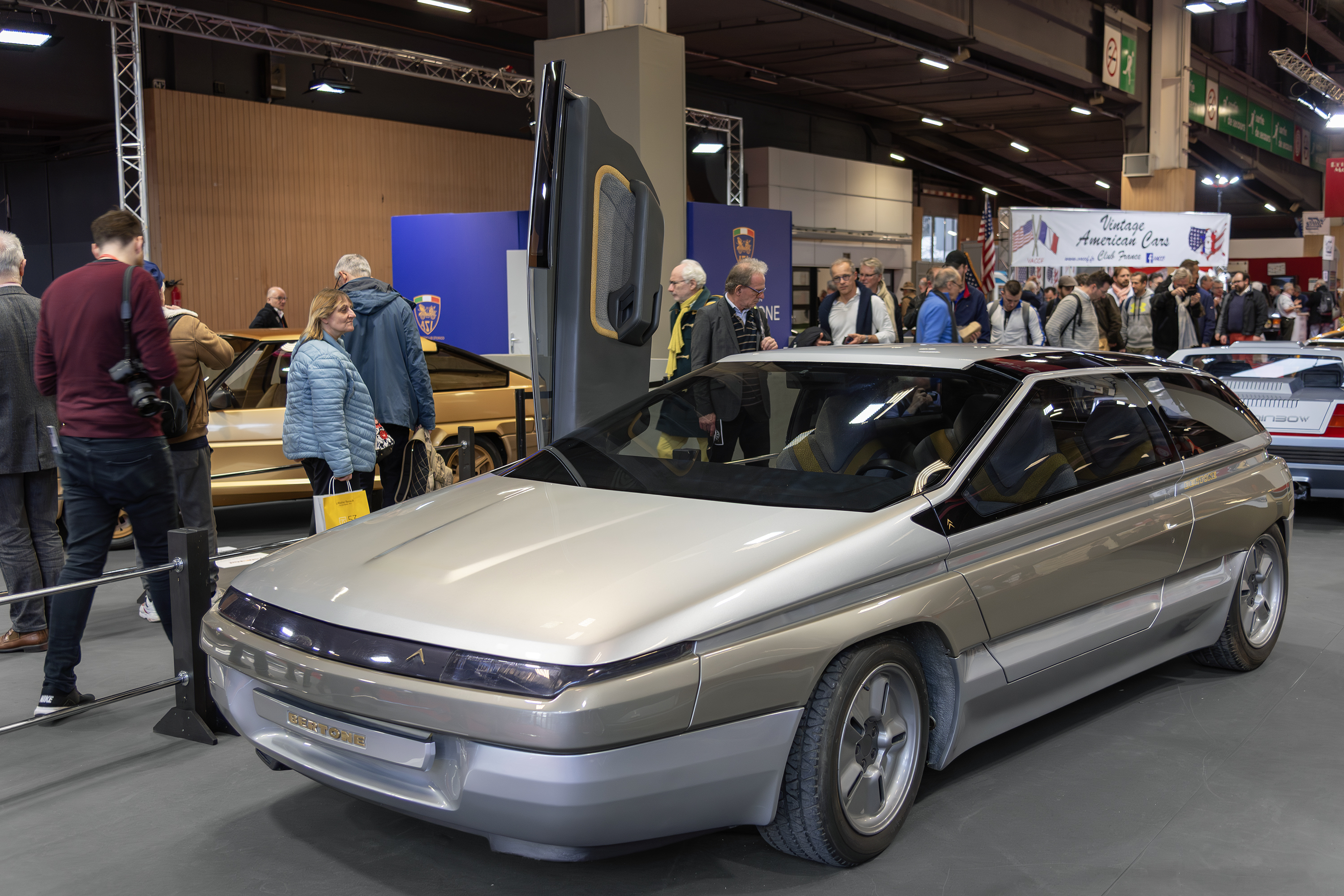
At Retromobile 2020

Notable features of the car include an all-LCD monitor display for the odometer, gauges, and more, as well as a “belt-type” steering wheel that rotated in either direction while mounted on the main display. The Zabrus is a shooting brake with a 2+2 seating configuration, with two scissor doors upfront for easy access to the rear seats.

The Zabrus was powered by the 2141 cc turbocharged I4 engine from the BX 4TC, producing 147 kW (197 hp; 200 PS) at 5250 rpm and 294 N⋅m (217 lb⋅ft) of torque at 2750 rpm. Like the 4TC, the Zabrus is all wheel drive and power is sent to the wheels through a five speed manual transmission. This setup gave it a top speed of 138 mph (222 km/h).
