= Alfa Romeo Canguro =

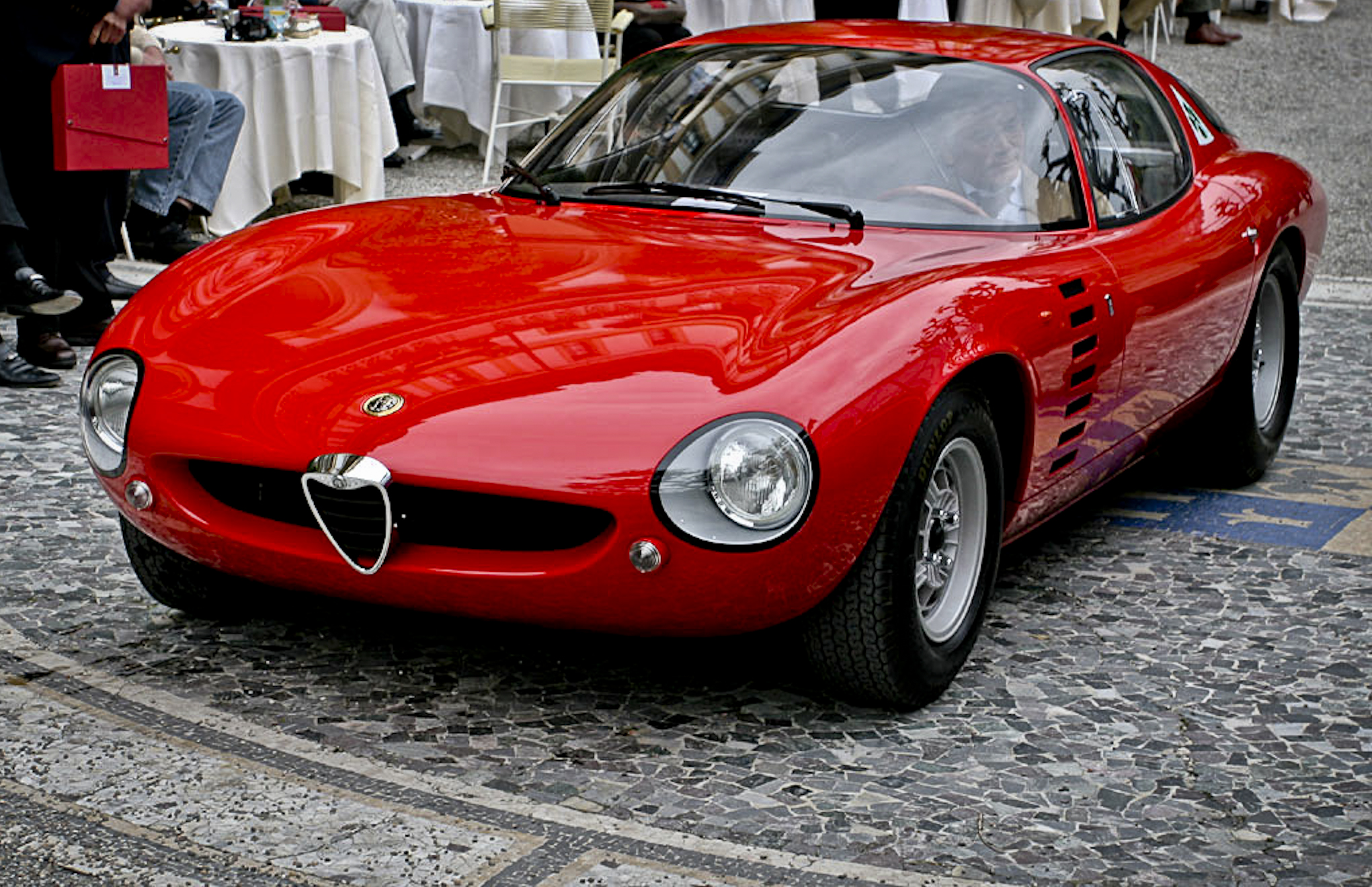

Overview
- Manufacturer: Alfa Romeo
- Production: 1964
- Designer: Giorgetto Giugiaro at Bertone

Body and chassis
- Class: Concept car
- Body style: 2-door coupe
- Layout: Front mid-engine, rear-wheel-drive
- Related: Alfa Romeo TZ

Powertrain
- Engine: 1.6 L DOHC I4
- Transmission: 5-speed manual

Dimensions
- Wheelbase: 2,200 mm (87 in)
- Length: 3,673 mm (144.6 in)
- Width: 1,564 mm (61.6 in)
- Height: 1,050 mm (41 in)
- Curb weight: 650 kg (1,430 lb)

The Alfa Romeo Canguro is a concept car designed by Giorgetto Giugiaro at Bertone. The car is based on the chassis of an Alfa Romeo TZ and was shown at the 1964 Paris Motor Show. The body is made of fiberglass rather than aluminium and it features one of the first glued in windscreens in a car. The name "Canguro" means Kangaroo in Italian.

== History ==
The Canguro was designed as a possible concept for a roadgoing version of the Alfa Romeo Giulia TZ which had been recently successful in racing. Alfa Romeo had given one TZ chassis each to rival design houses Pininfarina and Bertone to see who could make the better design. The Canguro was Bertone's entry, designed by Giorgetto Giugiaro. The concept was well received but Alfa Romeo never produced the design, many speculate this is because they didn't have the capacity at the time to build the bodies for the Canguro. The Canguro suffered a front end collision with the 1963 Chevrolet Testudo, another Bertone concept, while on track at the Monza circuit. The damage was deemed too great to fix by Nuccio Bertone and the car was left to sit outside Bertone's factory. The car was later restored by the owner of Gallery Abarth, Shiro Kosaka, and made its debut at the 2005 Ville d’Este Concours d’Elegance where it was voted "Best of show".

== Technical specifications ==
The Canguro is powered by a front mounted longitudinal 1.6 L (1570 cc) I4 engine with 2 valves per cylinder producing 112 bhp (84 kW; 114 PS). The engine is paired to a 5-speed manual transmission sending power to the rear wheels. The chassis is a steel space frame derived from the Alfa Romeo TZ and has the chassis number 10511 AR 750101.
