= Bertone Suagnà =

Concept car designed by Bertone

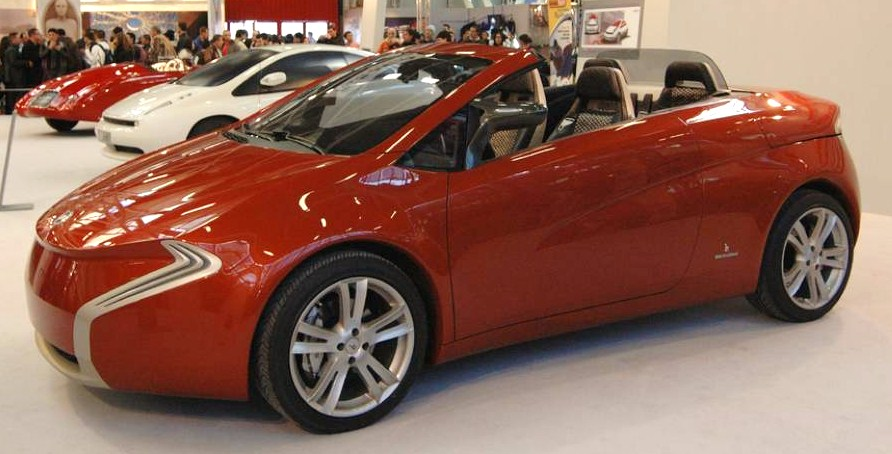

Overview
- Manufacturer: Bertone
- Production: 2006
- Designer: Giuliano Biasio at Bertone

Body and chassis
- Class: Concept car
- Body style: 4-seater convertible
- Layout: FR layout
- Related: Fiat Grande Punto

The Bertone Suagnà is a concept car developed by Bertone in 2007 and based on the Fiat Grande Punto.
