= Lamborghini Athon =

Concept car designed by Bertone

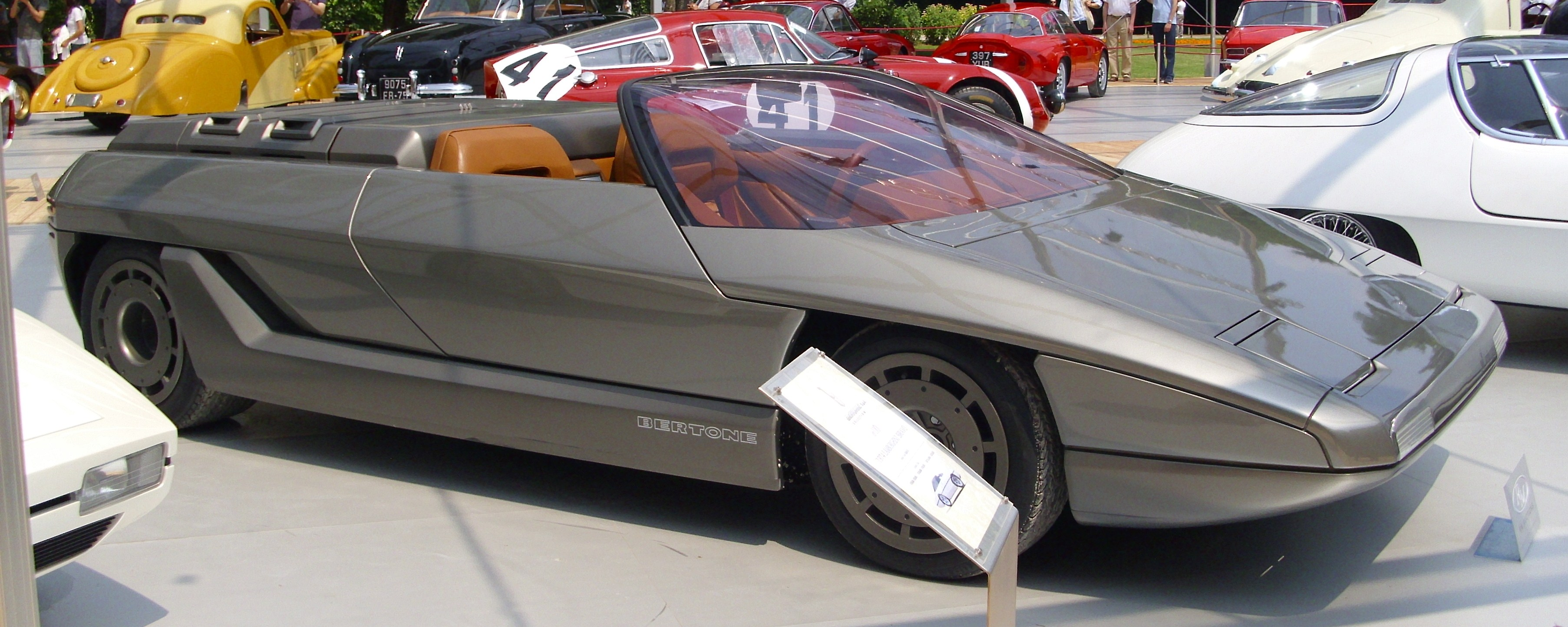
- Lamborghini Athon at the 2011 Concorso d'Eleganza Villa d'Este

Overview
- Manufacturer: Lamborghini
- Model years: 1980
- Designer: Marc Deschamps at Bertone

Body and chassis
- Layout: Transverse mid-engine, rear-wheel-drive
- Related: Lamborghini Silhouette

Powertrain
- Engine: 3.0 L (183 cu in) V8 engine
- Transmission: 5-speed manual

Dimensions
- Wheelbase: 96.6 in (2,455 mm)
- Length: 147.2 in (3,739 mm)
- Width: 74.1 in (1,882 mm)
- Height: 41 in (1,041 mm)

The Lamborghini Athon is a concept car designed by Bertone for Lamborghini.

== Specifications ==
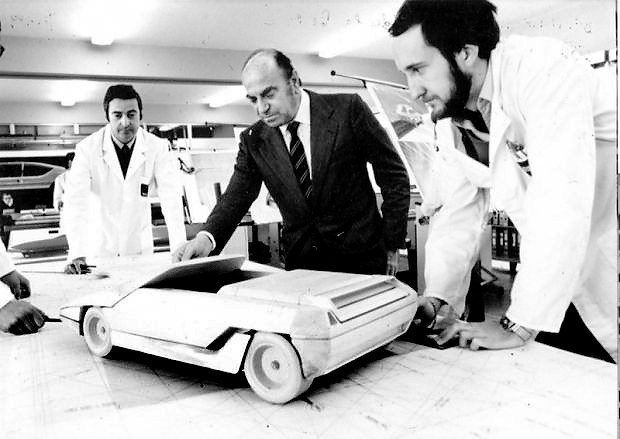
Nuccio Bertone next to a model of the Athon

The Lamborghini Athon is capable of being driven and is a fully functional production concept car. Under the hood of the Athon sits a 3.0 L DOHC V8 engine from the Lamborghini Silhouette, with two valves per cylinder capable of a max power of 260 hp (194 kW) at 7,500 rpm and 237 lb⋅ft (321 N⋅m) of torque with a compression ratio of ten to one. The transmission contains an all synchromesh gearbox that consists of a five speed with a single plate hydraulically assisted clutch and an axle ratio of 14/35. The concept uses an integral chassis and steel body. The suspension has independent wry coil springs and telescopic shock absorbers. The wheels are Campagnolo cast magnesium units with pneumatically actuated brakes featuring Girling ventilated discs. The front tyres are Michelin 195/50 VR 15 and 275/40 VR 15 at the rear. The Athon weighs 2,390 lbs and has an 80 litre fuel tank. The RM Sotheby's company auctioned the Athon in Concorso d'Eleganza Villa d'Este on May 21, 2011. It sold for $487,000 United States Dollars and its present-day estimated price value, according to RM Auctions, is between $213,000 to $312,000 United States Dollars.

== Design and history ==
The Bertone company, a private company based in Italy, created the Athon to show their everlasting support for the Lamborghini company according to the Turin coachbuilder press release. The Athon was given its name because the car is a spider and made for fair-weather; the name makes reference to the Egyptian cult of the sun.

=== Design ===
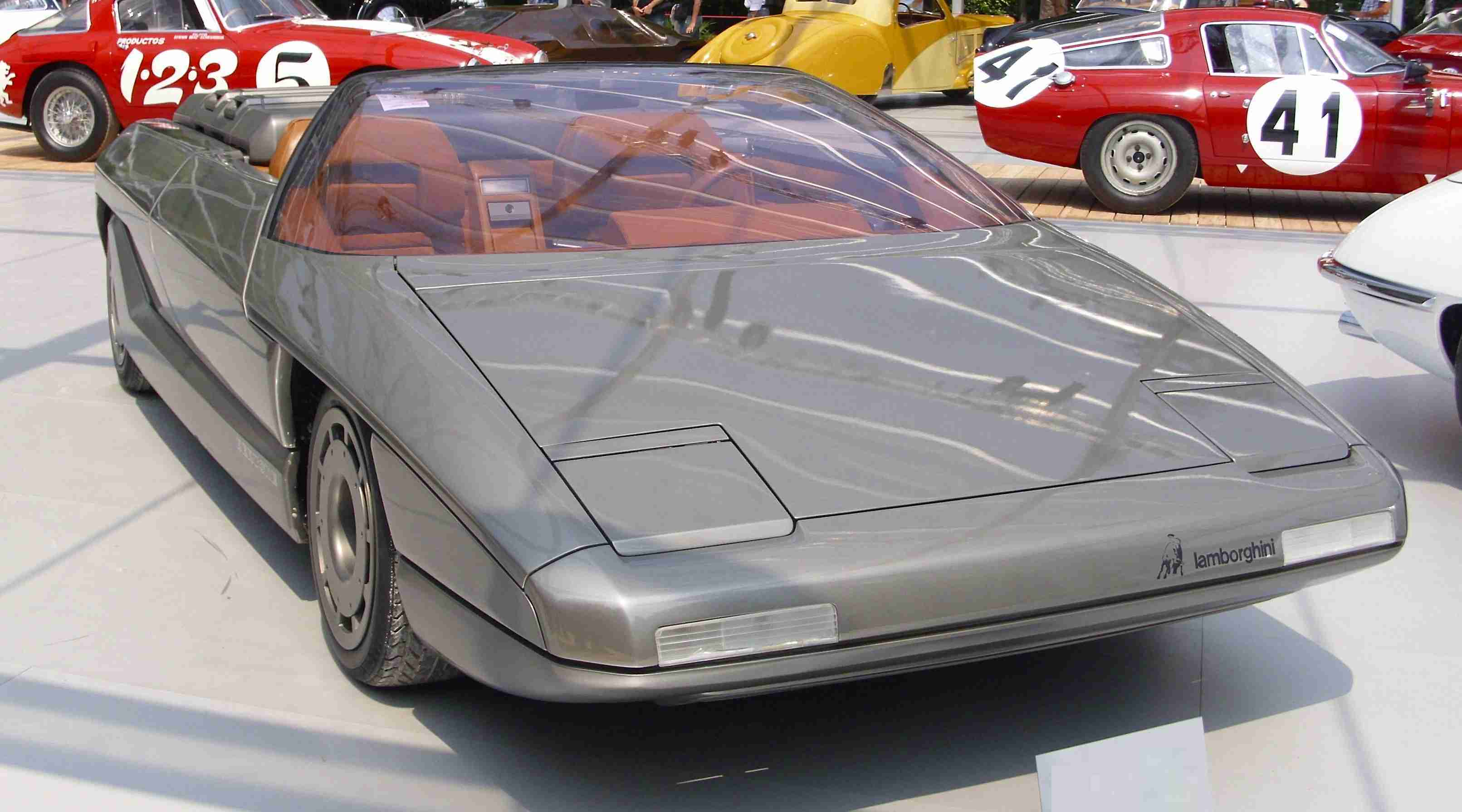
Front view

Marc Deschamps, a Frenchman, led the design process for the Lamborghini Athon, which was Bertone Studio's first ever concept car. He was chosen to lead the design after Marcello Gandini left the position as the design coordinator in 1979 for Bertone. The car was based on the silhouette sport type aesthetic and resembled some of the looks of the Lamborghini Urraco. Marc Deschamps honored the prior design of Bertone's concept cars; he specifically made the Athon much like the concept cars Bertone created in the 1970s. He included "sculpted geometric volumes" that were defined by clear edges and cut lines. He also did not follow what is universally known as the traditional spider design for the car. The Athon, a proclaimed spider, has its cabin located in a forward position as opposed to the traditional mid-set cabin in a normal spider. Another detail that sets the Athon apart from the original aesthetics of a spider is the height and position of the rear deck compared to the height and positioning of the sloping hood. This design concept would later be used when the Bertone company created the Jalpa Speedster. The design of the Athon also influenced media and movie productions.

Marc Deschamps was also inspired by Nuccio Bertone to add a few more unique features to the car's body. For example, Marc Deschamps created the doors so they would have a noticeable gap between the doors and the door sills. Deschamps also designed the tail lights to have very thin grooves in order to assure that they did not interfere with the solid rear end of the car. The instrument panel featured a single-spoke steering wheel and touch screen panels equipped with electronic readouts. A pod within close reach of the steering wheel held windshield wiper and indicator switches and Veglia, an Italian supplier, created the digital instruments. The Athon's design was created to honor Fillipo Perini's devout love to the Lamborghini Silhouette aesthetic appearance. His impact as a designer for Lamborghini is seen in the Athon's front sloping hood. The Athon was forcefully given to the Bertone company as the Lamborghini company was in the process of liquidation and going through financial difficulty. The Athon was retired in the Bertone museum located in Rubiana, Italy directly after it showcased in the Turin Auto Show. Bertone occasionally removed the car from its museum and made it displayed for the public at a few select shows. Although it has had minor repairs to some of the mechanical components of the car, the Athon was never restored. The Athon was referenced when making the props for the films Tron, Total Recall, and RoboCop.

== Impact on Lamborghini ==
The Athon was created during Lamborghini's financial crisis, which threatened to end with the company's liquidation. As a result, the Athon's greatest impact on the company would have to be when Bertone put it in their museum. The press associated with this move brought more attention to the Athon and Lamborghini as a company.
