= Giovanni Bertone =

Italian automobile designer (1884–1972)

Giovanni Bertone (left) with his son Giuseppe "Nuccio" Bertone (right)

Giovanni Bertone (1884 in Mondovì, Piedmont – 10 May 1972 in Turin) was an Italian automobile designer, known for establishing the Carrozzeria Bertone business.

== Life and career ==
Bertone was the sixth of the seven sons from a farming family. He had worked as a carriage wheelmaker, and was employed at Diatto (1907) when he established his own carriage building and repair shop in Corso Peschiera in Turin (1912).

Being a friend of Vincenzo Lancia, he got contracts from Fiat and thus entered the automobile design market, his first self made car body being based on a (Società Piemontese Automobili) S.P.A. 9000 in 1921. Another early success at this time was the Fiat 501 competition car. Subsequently, Bertone also designed many Lancia cars. His son Nuccio Bertone (1914–1997) took over the company in 1950.
