= Lamborghini Marzal =

Concept car designed by Bertone

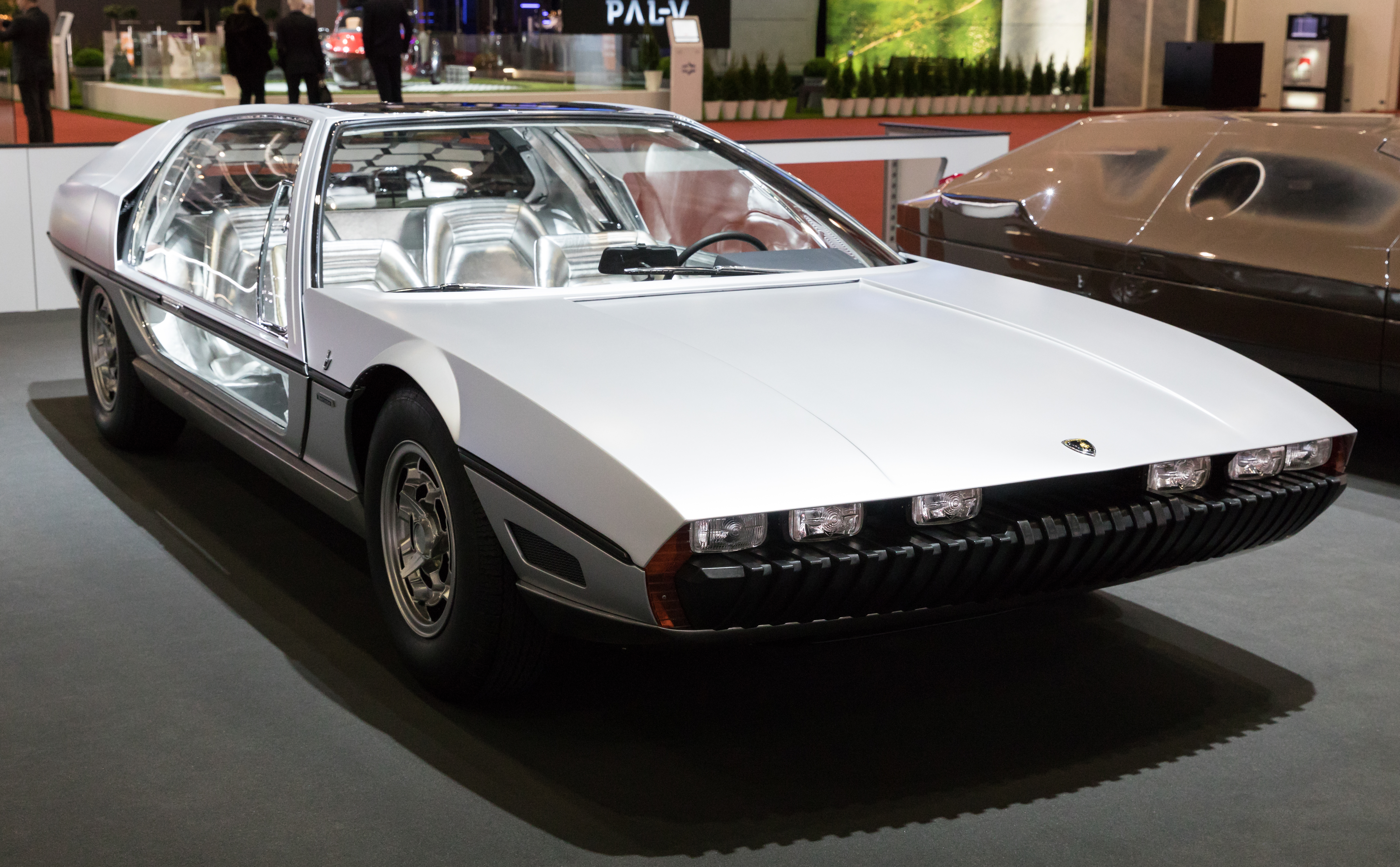
- Lamborghini Marzal on display at the 2018 Geneva Motor Show

Overview
- Manufacturer: Lamborghini
- Production: 1967; 1 built
- Designer: Marcello Gandini at Bertone

Body and chassis
- Class: Concept car
- Layout: RR layout
- Doors: Gull-wing

Powertrain
- Engine: 2.0 L I6
- Transmission: 5-speed manual

Dimensions
- Wheelbase: 2,620 mm (103.1 in)
- Length: 4,450 mm (175.2 in)
- Width: 1,700 mm (66.9 in)
- Height: 1,100 mm (43.3 in)
- Curb weight: 2,690 lb (1,220 kg)

The Lamborghini Marzal is a concept car, first presented by Lamborghini at the 1967 Geneva Motor Show.

== History ==
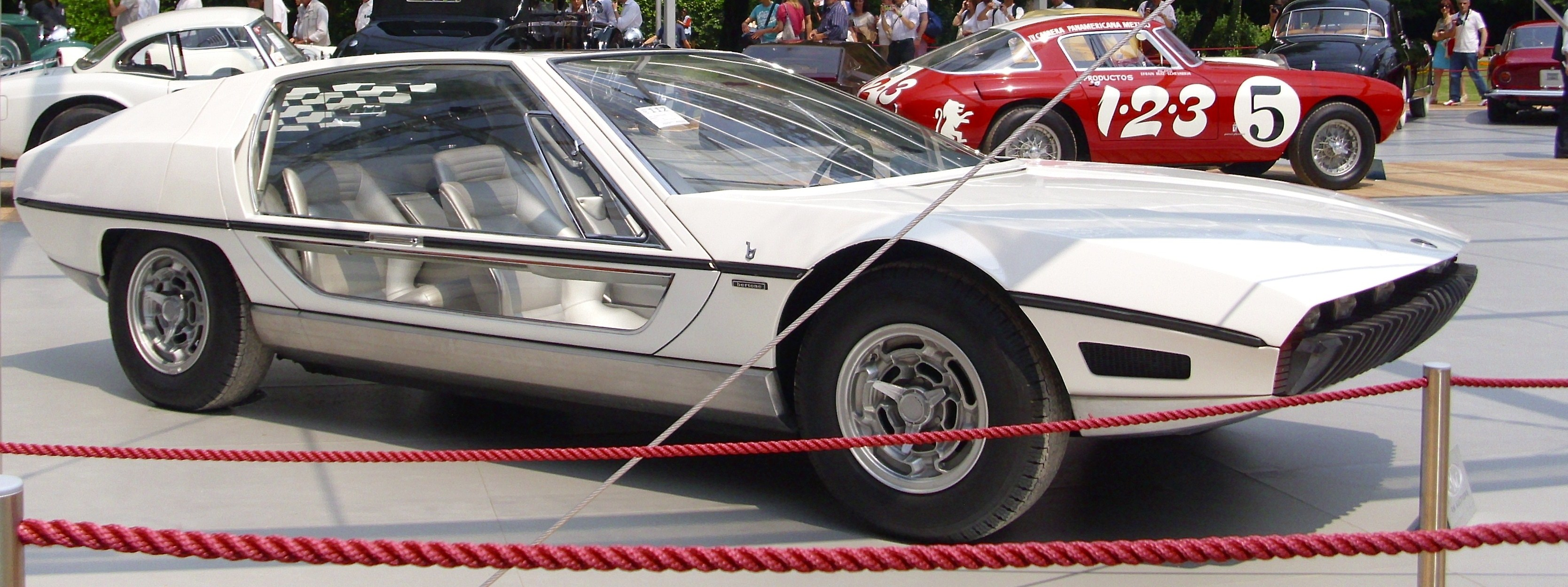
Side view of the Marzal

Designed by Marcello Gandini of Bertone, it was created to supply Ferruccio Lamborghini with a true four-seater car for his lineup which already included the 400GT 2+2 and the Miura. Mr. Lamborghini initially viewed the creation of the Marzal as advertising rather than a production model, stating:

The Marzal was not developed as a production car. If you present a car like the Marzal at automobile shows such as Geneva, Turin, and Frankfurt all the magazines report on the first page about it. You would rather spend 100 million lire for building such an automobile which is still less expensive than paying for all the advertising. That would cost almost a billion lire. So it compensates in any case to build such a throwaway car.

The Marzal remained a one-off, though the general shape and many of the ideas would later be used in the Lamborghini Espada.

The Marzal's styling was radical at the time of its introduction, with Road & Track magazine calling it "A Bertone design so fresh that everything else looks old fashioned." It was distinguished by glazed gull-wing doors and a strong hexagonal motif throughout, including in the louvered rear window, interior trim and unique Campagnolo magnesium wheels. Other innovative styling elements included silver interior upholstery and 6 narrow S.E.V. Marchal headlamps in the thin, wedge-shaped nose.

Several companies made die-cast models based on the Marzal, including Dinky Toys and Matchbox. Many were in other colours such as orange, despite the original show car being painted silver.

The Marzal appeared in action at a public event for the first time at the 1967 Monaco Grand Prix when Prince Rainier III, accompanied by his wife, Princess Grace, drove the car on his traditional parade lap before the start of the race. The car made a second public appearance at the 1996 Concorso Italiano in Monterey, California in honor of Carrozzeria Bertone. The Lamborghini Athon was also exhibited at this time. The car was driven by Prince Albert II during the opening ceremony of the 2018 Historic Grand Prix of Monaco.

The Marzal was located for a long time in the Bertone Design Study Museum. It sold at RM Sotheby's Villa d'Este auction on 21 May 2011 for 1,512,000 Euros including buyer's premium.

== Specifications ==
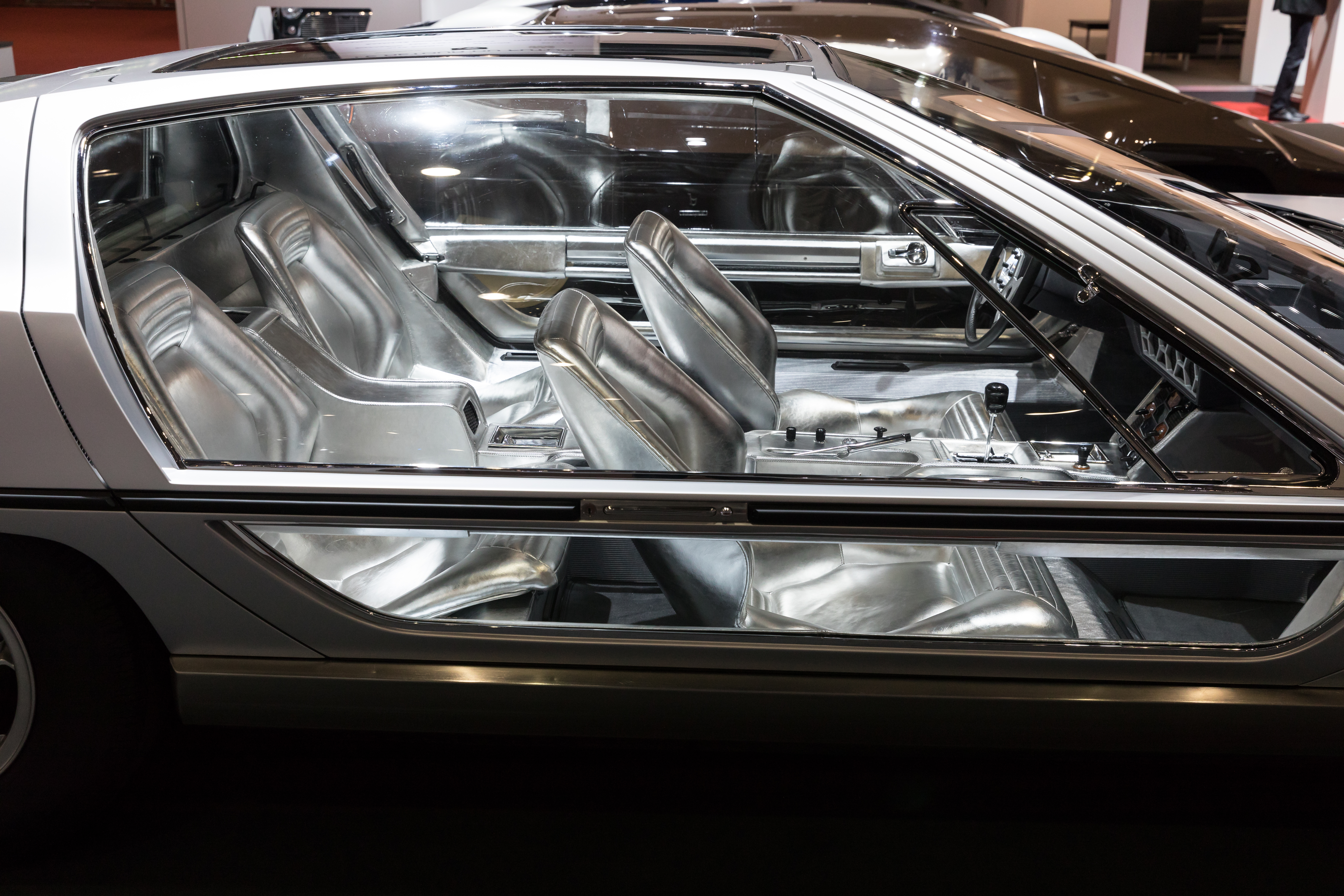
Marzal interior

The Marzal was powered by a 2.0 L inline-six engine, which produced a claimed 175 bhp (130 kW) at 6800 rpm and a peak torque of 18.2 kilogram metres (132 lb⋅ft) at 4600 rpm. Top speed was estimated at 118 miles per hour (190 km/h). This engine was designed by Giampaolo Dallara and was a split-in-half version of the 4.0L Lamborghini V12, mated to a 5-speed transaxle. It was equipped with three Weber 40 DCOE carburetors, with air intakes positioned directly behind the rear passengers' heads. The engine was mounted transversely in the rear of the car, fully behind the rear axle. The transaxle was from a Miura, with a higher final drive ratio of 5.30 to improve acceleration.

The Marzal chassis was based on the production Miura chassis, extended by 120 millimetres (4.7 in) and stiffened. The resulting wheelbase was 2,620 millimetres (103 in). The front hood was made from aluminum with the remaining non-glazed bodywork constructed from steel. Gross weight was 2,690 pounds (1,220 kg). When visiting Bertone in the spring of 1967, journalist L.J.K. Setright observed that "five large blocks of metal and a moderately small anvil" had been placed in the front compartment of the Marzal in order to level the ride height from front to back.

The suspension, steering and brakes used in the Marzal were all taken from the production Miura. Suspension travel was limited compared to the Miura, due to the design of the bodywork. Bertone designed unique 14 in diameter by 6.5 inch wide magnesium centerlock wheels, made by Campagnolo. These were similar in construction to those used on the Miura and Espada, but were visually unique, with two rows of nearly-hexagonal air ducts. Pirelli Cinturato HS tires in size 205-14 were fitted.

In total, 4.5 square metres (48 ft^{2}) of glass paneling was used in the Marzal, all supplied by Glaverbel. This company had previously provided Bertone with the glass used in the Alfa Romeo Carabo and the Miura's rear window. An air conditioning system was installed in order to deal with the resulting high passenger compartment temperatures.
