= Opel Slalom =

Concept car designed by Bertone

Bertone Opel Slalom
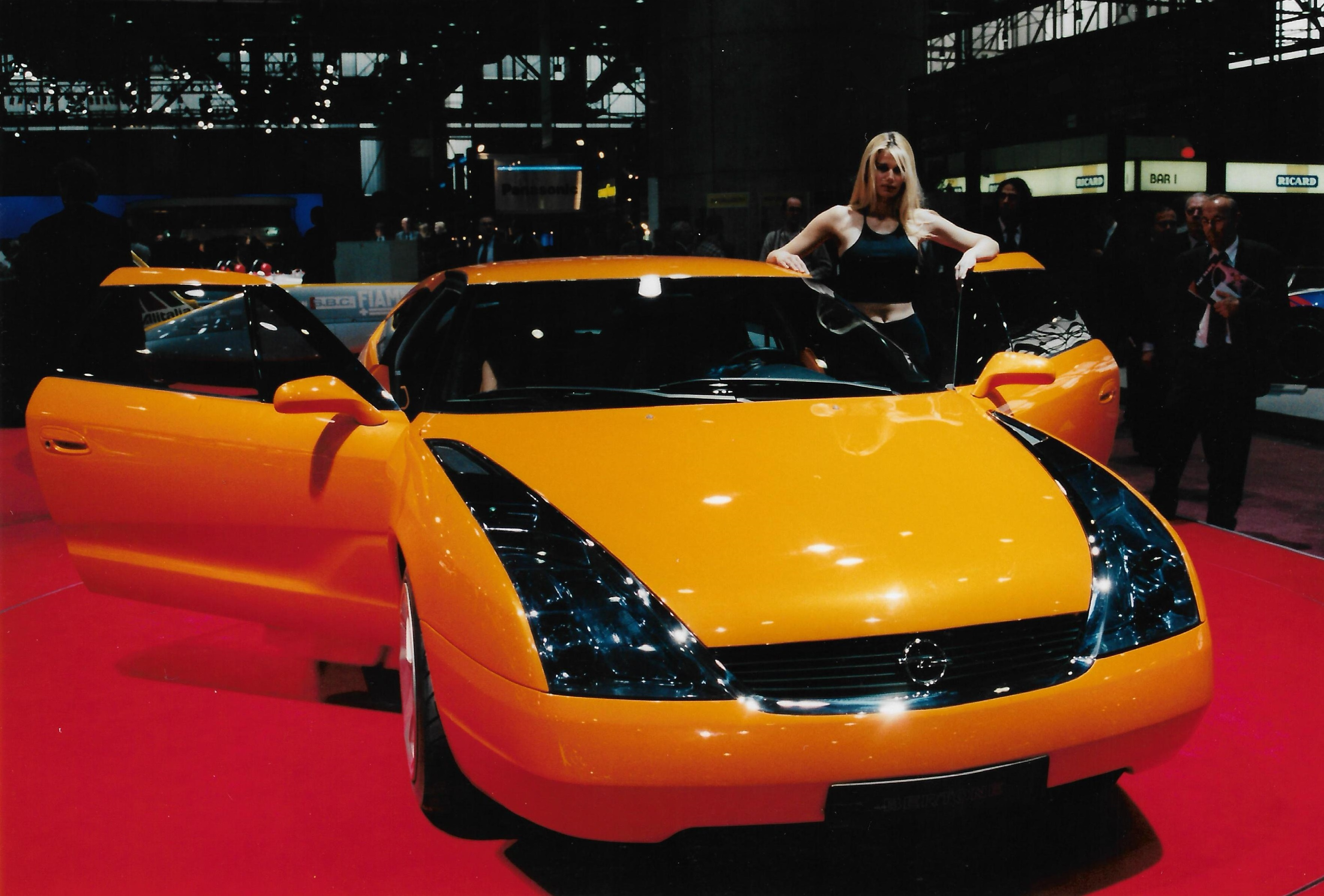

Overview
- Manufacturer: Opel
- Production: March 1996
- Designer: Luciano D'Ambrosio at Bertone

Body and chassis
- Class: Mid-size luxury concept car
- Body style: 3-door 2+2 coupé
- Layout: F4
- Related: Opel Insignia Concept

Powertrain
- Engine: 2.0L 16v Turbocharged I4

Dimensions
- Wheelbase: 260 cm (102.4 in)
- Length: 464.4 cm (182.8 in)
- Width: 186 cm (73.2 in)
- Height: 132 cm (52.0 in)

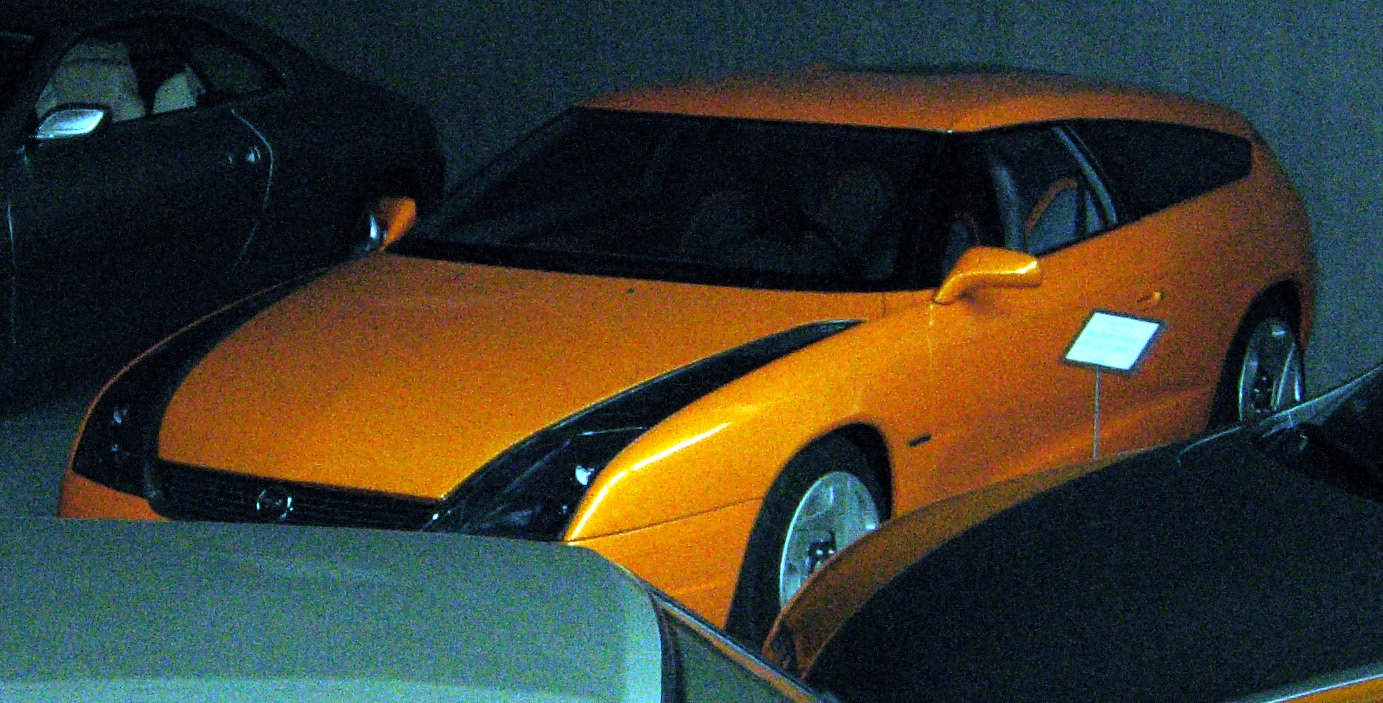
Opel Slalom (Caprie, November 2006)

The Opel Slalom was a mid-size luxury concept car produced by Opel in collaboration with the design company Bertone. The car was first presented to the public at the Geneva Motor Show in March 1996. The Slalom had one such 2.0-litre turbocharged 16-valve I4 engine which produced 204 hp (152 kW) and used the layout of F4.

The same engine was also used in the production Opel Calibra, which was produced from 1989 to 1997.
