= Bertone GB110 =

Car model

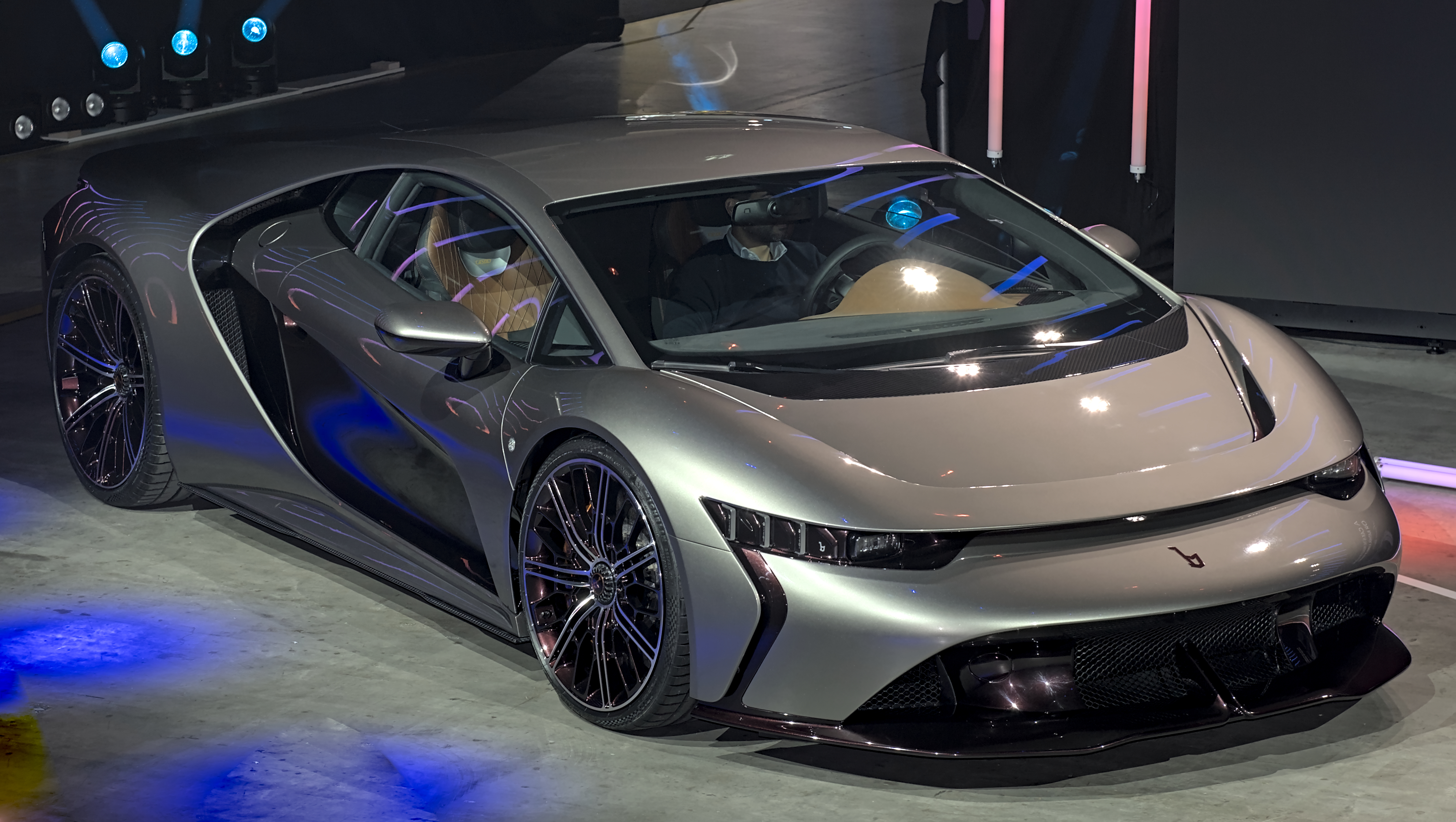

Overview
- Manufacturer: Bertone
- Production: 2024- (33 units planned)
- Designer: Andrea Mocellin under Giovanni Sapio

Body and chassis
- Class: Sports car
- Body style: 2-door coupe
- Layout: Mid-engine, four-wheel-drive
- Platform: Volkswagen Group Modular Sports System Platform
- Related: Lamborghini Huracán; Audi R8 (Type 4S); Italdesign Zerouno

Powertrain
- Engine: 5.2 L FSI twin-turbocharged Lamborghini CSJ V10
- Power output: 1,127 bhp (840 kW; 1,143 PS)
- Transmission: 7-speed dual clutch

The Bertone GB110 is a limited production mid-engined sports car produced by Bertone.

== History ==
The first images of the GB110 were released in December 2022. Bertone presented the production version for the first time in June 2024 at the Top Marques in Monaco. The wedge shape is intended to be reminiscent of the Lancia Stratos 0 introduced by Bertone in 1970. A total of 33 GB110s are to be built.

== Specifications ==
The GB110 is powered by a modified version of the 5.2-liter V10 petrol engine used in the Lamborghini Huracán. In the GB110, it produces a maximum output of 827 kW (1,109 hp) at 8170 rpm and 1,100 N⋅m (811 lbf⋅ft) of torque at 6650 rpm. Power is transmitted to all four wheels via a 7-speed dual-clutch transmission. The car is said to accelerate from 0 to 300 km/h (186 mph) in 12.9 seconds, and has a top speed of 350 km/h (217 mph). The 21-inch front and 22-inch rear forged aluminum wheels are mounted on double wishbones. Carbon-ceramic brakes are used. The interior of the two-door model is accessible via scissor doors.

Standard equipment includes a head-up display, a navigation system, and automatic climate control.
