= Bertone Genesis =

Concept car designed by Bertone

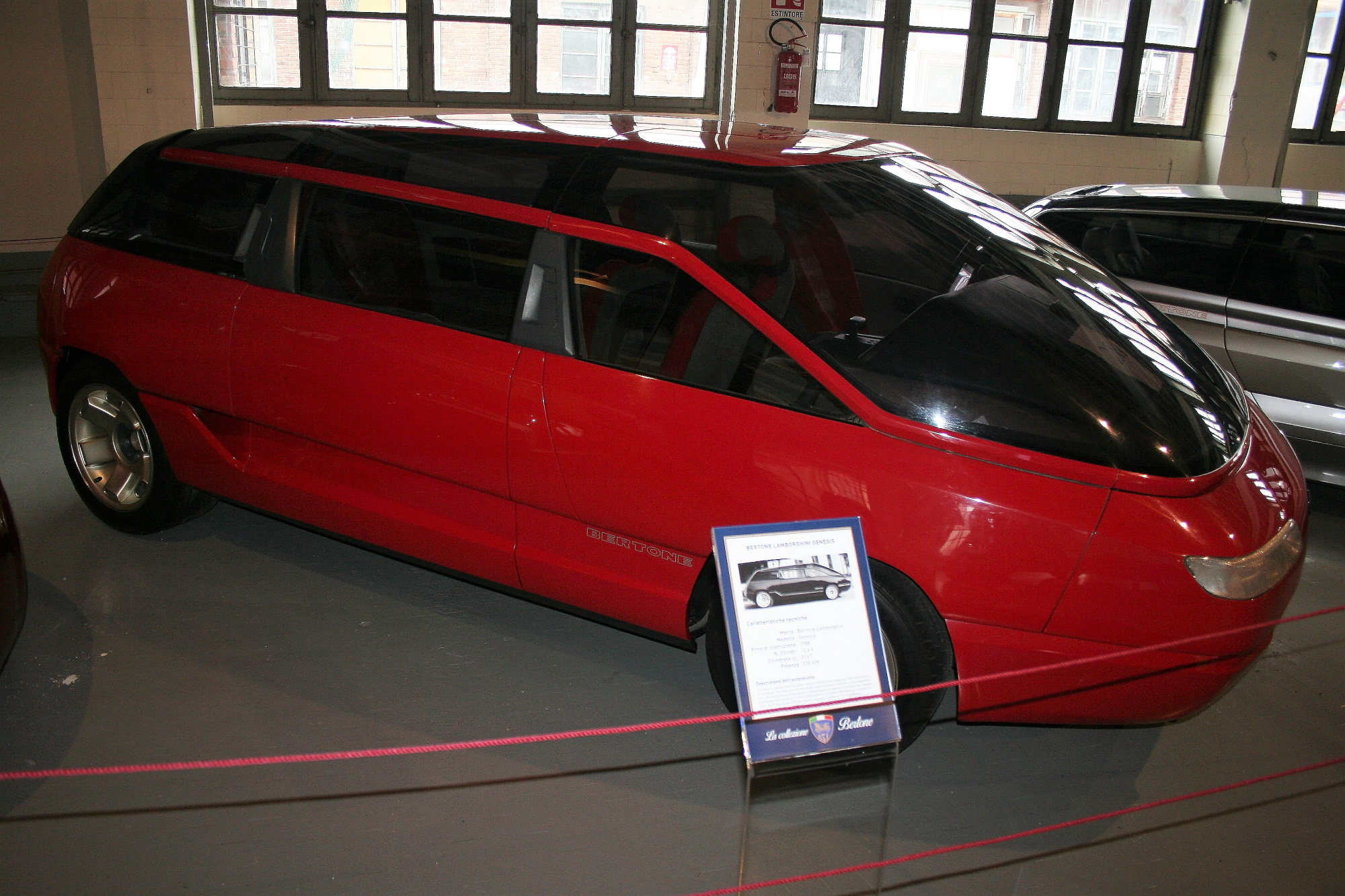
- Bertone Genesis at the Bertone collection of the Automotoclub Storico Italiano (ASI)

Overview
- Manufacturer: Bertone
- Also called: Lamborghini Genesis
- Production: 1988
- Designer: Bertone under Marc Deschamps

Body and chassis
- Body style: 5-door minivan
- Layout: FR layout
- Doors: Gullwing doors

Powertrain
- Engine: 5.2 L (5,167cc) V12
- Transmission: 3-speed TorqueFlite automatic

Dimensions
- Wheelbase: 2,650 mm (104 in)
- Length: 4,475 mm (176 in)

The Bertone Genesis, sometimes referred to as the Lamborghini Genesis, is a Bertone designed concept car using Lamborghini parts. It was first displayed to the public at the 1988 Turin Auto Show.

The Genesis is a five-door minivan and features gull-wing doors in the front and sliding doors at the back. It was powered by the same 455 bhp (339 kW) 5.2 L V12 engine found in the Lamborghini Countach Quattrovalvole, mated to a 3 speed TorqueFlite automatic transmission sending power to the rear wheels. The Genesis was significantly slower than the Countach though, with a weight of around 1,800 kg (3,968 lb) combined with the shorter gear ratios from the Chrysler 3-speed transmission.

The interior of the Genesis features seating for five, with two bucket seats in the front, placed over the engine, and three bucket seats in the rear, arranged in a V pattern. The rear two seats feature retractable leg rests which extend from under the seat, while the third rear seat, positioned further forward and in the middle of the other two, can swivel 180 degrees to face backwards, as well as be folded down.

While the LM002 had recently finished production, freeing up potential assembly space for the Genesis, or a vehicle like it, it was never really intended to go beyond the show car design study.
