= Gruppo Bertone =

Italian automobile company

Coordinates: 45.4631558°N 9.172412°E

Bertone
- Industry: Automotive
- Founded: Turin, Italy (during 1912; 114 years ago)
- Founder: Giovanni Bertone
- Area served: Worldwide
- Products: Cars
- Services: Coachbuilder of vehicles
- Owner: Jean-Franck Ricci; Mauro Ricci
- Website: bertone.it

Gruppo Bertone, commonly known as Bertone, was an Italian industrial design company which specialized in car styling, coachbuilding and manufacturing. It was also a car manufacturing company.

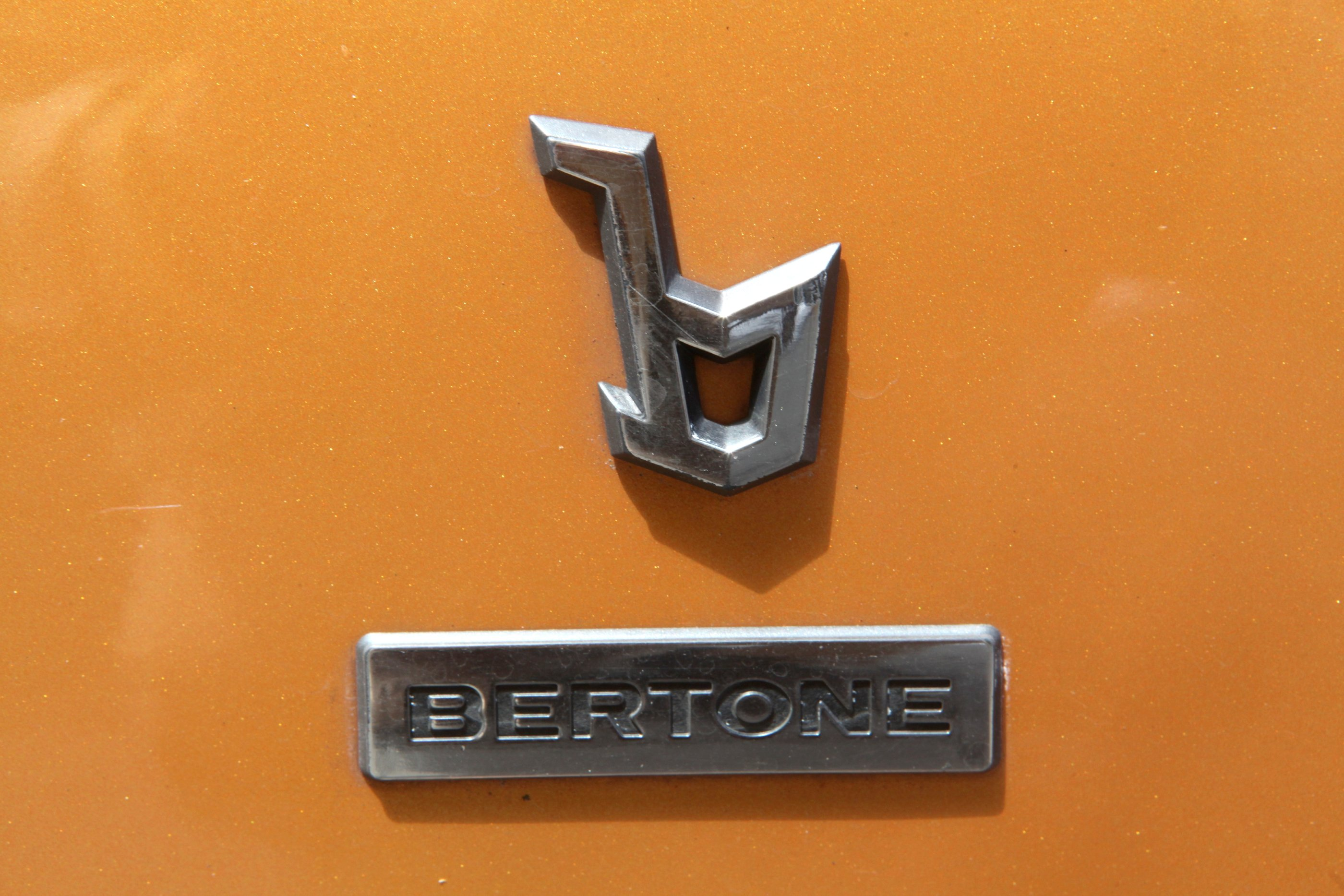
Bertone logo from an Opel Astra G Coupe Bertone

The company was based in Grugliasco, northern Italy. Gruppo Bertone was founded as Carrozzeria Bertone in 1912 by Giovanni Bertone. Designer Nuccio Bertone took charge of the company after World War II and the company was divided into two units: Carrozzeria for manufacturing and Stile Bertone for styling. Until its bankruptcy in 2014, the company was headed by the widow of Nuccio Bertone, Lilli Bertone. At the time of bankruptcy, it had around 100 direct employees. In 2014, most employees lost their jobs and were not absorbed by following acquisitions. Cars from the company museum went to other museums, like Automotoclub Storico Italiano and Volandia.

After its bankruptcy, the Bertone name was acquired by an architect and retained by some of its former employees, who continued as a Milan-based small external design office, Bertone Design, more focused on industrial design and architecture. Bertone Design was sold to the group AKKA Technologies in the second quarter of 2016, which already had automotive design activities through Mercedes-Benz Technologies. The AKKA Technologies group subsequently sold the Bertone brand in 2020 to Mauro and Jean-Franck Ricci, the new owners. In 2022, Mauro and Jean-Franck Ricci revived the Bertone brand. The first in a series of limited edition vehicles, the GB110, was presented in December 2022, then unveiled in June 2024.

== History ==
=== Early years ===
Giovanni Bertone started a carriage manufacturing business in Turin, Italy, at the age of 28. Along with three workers, he built horse-drawn vehicles. In 1914, Bertone's second son, Giuseppe, nicknamed "Nuccio", was born. The outbreak of the First World War forced Giovanni Bertone to close his company. In 1920, a new plant was opened near the Monginevro 119 in Turin. Twenty people were on the payroll. One year later, a contract on a torpedo-styled body based on the SPA 23S chassis was signed by the company. Then, the FIAT "501 Sport Siluro Corsa" was designed.

During the 1920s, Giovanni Bertone began doing bodywork on the Fast, Chiribiri, Aurea, SCAT, and Diatto chassis. Vincenzo Lancia nicknamed him "Bertunot"; he commissioned Bertone to create cars for the "limited series". Giovanni Bertone produced torpedo and saloon bodies for FIAT and Lancia and for Itala, Diatto, and SPA. Alongside sports models like the 1928 Ansaldo 6BS, Giovanni Bertone also designed cars like the Fiat 505 limousine and the Itala 51S, both in 1924. He later designed the Lancia Lambda VIII Series in 1928. In 1932, Giovanni designed the Lancia Artena, which was produced until 1936. In 1933, Nuccio Bertone officially began working in his father's company. The company moved to Corso Peschiera 225. Gruppo Bertone now had fifty members of staff. In 1934, Bertone created the Fiat 527S Ardita 2500.

With the outbreak of the Second World War, Bertone reacted to the crisis by turning to manufacturing military vehicles. The company created vehicles such as the Bertone ambulance on a Lancia Artena base. The chassis Fiat 2800 cabriolet was manufactured; it was built on commission for race driver and motoring journalist Giovanni Lurani Cernuschi. Nuccio Bertone also created cars like the Lancia Aprilia Cabriolet, the Fiat 1100 Stanguellini racing car, and the Berlinetta Aerodinamica Tecnica (BAT) concept cars.

In 1956, they produced the Abarth 750 Record; it was built on a Fiat 600 chassis and tested on the high-speed track at Monza. Abarth 750 Record sets ten world records, including doing 4,000 kilometres (2,500 mi) at an average of 156.36 km/h and covering 10,125.26 km in 72 hours. In 1957, the company expanded to start the production of the NSU Sport Prinz. Construction work began in Grugliasco for a new plant that became operative in 1959 with a workforce of 550. At the end of the 1950s, Bertone created the Giulietta Sprint Speciale, the Aston Martin DB2/4, and the Maserati 3500 GT.

=== 1960s–1990s ===
Giorgetto Giugiaro came up with five variations of five GT models: the Alfa Romeo 2600 Sprint, in coupé and cabriolet versions; two Ferrari 250 GTs, one named 'Wax' after the commissioning client; and the others for his personal use, the Aston Martin DB4 GT 'Jet' and the Maserati 5000 GT. At the same time, two new industrial partnerships were worked on with the Simca 1000 Coupé and the BMW 3200 CS limited series. The ASA 1000 GT, better known as the "Ferrarina", or "little Ferrari" (as the project originated with Enzo Ferrari), was a commercial failure upon its release. The Iso Rivolta GT 300, the Iso Rivolta GT 340, and the Iso Grifo were also created in the 1960s. Giorgetto Giugiaro designed a prototype cabriolet of the latter and a racing version known as the A3C. The Grifo years were also the years of the Chevrolet Testudo, driven personally by Nuccio Bertone to the Geneva Motor Show in 1963. The following year, they created the Alfa Romeo Canguro, followed in 1965 by the Alfa Romeo Giulia GT.

In 1965, Bertone launched the Fiat 850 Spider. The commercial success of this model led Nuccio Bertone to increase the company's production capacity to 120 units per day. Between 1965 and 1972, nearly 140,000 were produced, the great majority of which were sold in the United States. With the Fiat 850, the company increased its production volumes, from 13,000 units produced in 1966 to nearly 30,000 in 1968.

At the end of the 1960s, they formed a partnership with Ferruccio Lamborghini. The first vehicle to come out of this was the Lamborghini Miura. The Miura was followed by the Marzal in 1967 and the Espada in 1968. In the same period, two other coupés appeared: the Alfa Romeo Montreal and the Fiat Dino Coupé, both out in 1967. At the Paris Motor Show of 1968, Bertone presented the Carabo concept car, based on an Alfa 33 chassis. By 1970, Bertone had a workforce of 1,500 staff, and the Grugliasco factory covered an area of 267,000 square metres (2,870,000 sq ft). The partnership with Lamborghini led to the development of the Lamborghini Espada. The design was inspired by the Jaguar Pirana. After his initial success with the Espada, he went on to design the Lamborghini Jarama and the Lamborghini Urraco.

In 1972, Giovanni Bertone died. In that year, as a tribute to the company's founder, the Maserati Khamsin and the Fiat X1/9 were released. Based on the Fiat 128 chassis but with a mid-rear-engine layout, the X1/9 was in production from 1972 to 1988, with 160,000 units manufactured. The company also began working for Volvo on the 264 TE. The Volvo 262C was presented at the 1977 Geneva Motor Show. From the start of the 1980s, the Fiat Ritmo Cabrio and the Fiat X1/9 were produced and sold directly under the Bertone brand. In 1982, Marcello Gandini turned out the Citroën BX. A new commercial agreement drawn up with General Motors Europe in 1986 saw the production of the Kadett Cabrio handed over to Bertone. In 1993, the Opel Astra Cabrio and the Fiat Punto Cabrio began production. Next year, Bertone presented the Zero Emission Record (ZER); Gruppo Bertone was also awarded the ISO 9001 quality certification.

=== 2000s–present ===
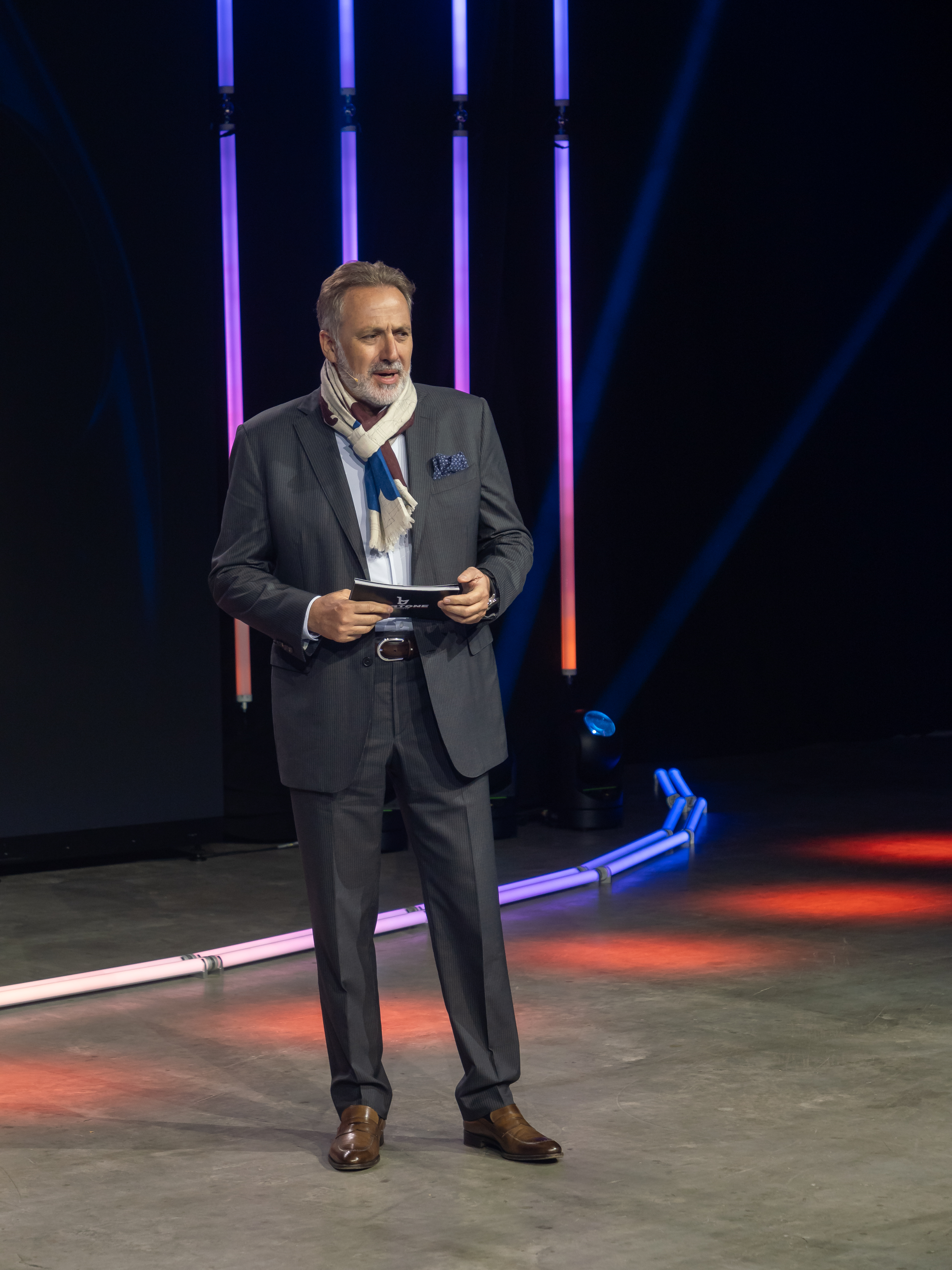
Jean-Franck Ricci

By 2009, a worsening financial situation caused Bertone to sell its Grugliasco plant, along with its manufacturing activities, to FIAT. Bertone underwent a major restructuring process. By then, the Bertone workforce had dropped to roughly 300 people, mainly engineers and designers. The financial situation continued, prompting Bertone to sell off some of its concept cars in 2011. After having ceased trading because of financial difficulties, Bertone, on 18 March 2014, confirmed that it would be declared bankrupt if a suitable buyer was not found by the end of April.

In May 2013, the license rights to the brand were granted by Bertone Cento to Bertone Design. They also formed a partnership with Citroën, but since the 2013 acquisition of the name, a car prototype or series was never made.

In June 2016, the Bertone brand was acquired for more than €2.6 million by AKKA Technologies, an engineering company. The rights to use the brand, however, were shared with Bertone Design which does not have the authorization to use it in the automotive field. Starting from November 2018, AKKA Technologies sold the license to use the Bertone brand in the electric automotive sector to Flymove Holding Limited UK, which in May 2019 proceeded with the definitive purchase of the brand for all applications and sectors. They relaunched Bertone through the presentation of new models of electric cars designed by Carlos Arroyo Turon (former Bertone Designer) and which use the battery swap system.

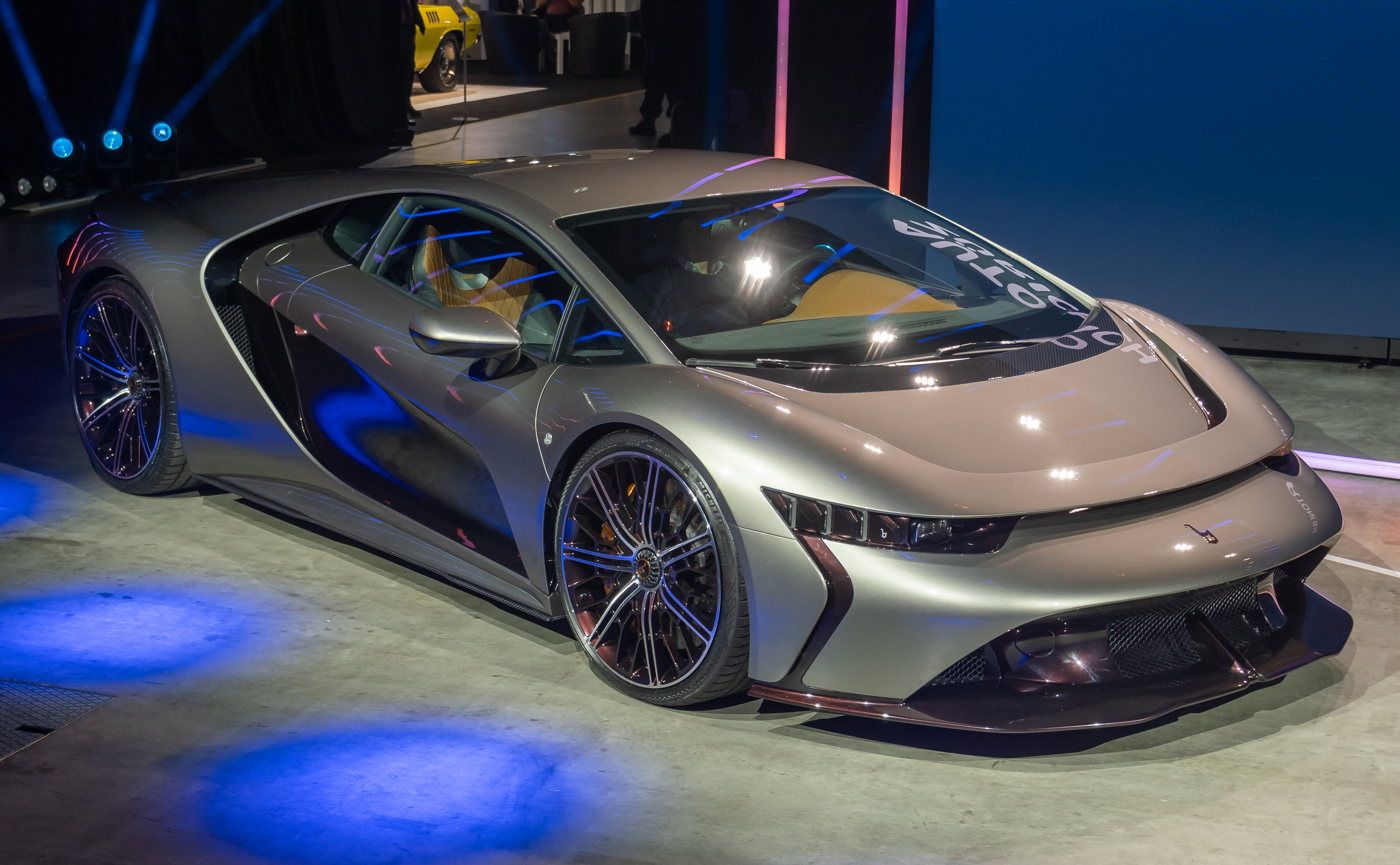
Bertone GB110 at Auto Zürich, November 2024

The AKKA Technologies group subsequently sold the Bertone brand to Ideactive, a company owned by Mauro and Jean-Franck Ricci. In 2022, the two Ricci brothers revived the Bertone brand. The first in a series of limited edition vehicles, the GB110, was launched in December 2022. In June 2024, the Bertone GB110 was publicly unveiled at Top Marques Monaco. In 2026, Bertone introduced the Runabout, a rear mid-engine sports car with a Toyota-sourced V6 engine, limited to 25 units, with a design inspired by the 1969 Autobianchi A112 Runabout concept car.

== Design and production activity ==
=== Passenger car designs ===
Concept cars and specials
Model	Year	Image
Abarth 1500 Biposto	1952	
Abarth OT 1000 Spider	1965	
Alfa Romeo 2000 Sportiva	1954	
Alfa Romeo BAT 11	2008	
Alfa Romeo BAT 5	1953	
Alfa Romeo BAT 7	1954	
Alfa Romeo BAT 9	1955	
Alfa Romeo Bella	1999	
Alfa Romeo Canguro	1964	
Alfa Romeo Carabo	1968	
Alfa Romeo Delfino	1983	
Alfa Romeo Montreal	1967	
Alfa Romeo Navajo	1976	
Alfa Romeo Pandion	2010	
Alfa Romeo Sportut	1997	
Aston Martin DB4 GT Jet	1961	
Aston Martin Rapide Jet 2+2	2013	
Aston Martin Vanquish Jet 2	2004	
Autobianchi A112 Runabout	1969	
Bertone Birusa	2003	
Bertone Blitz	1992	
Bertone Dianchè BSS GT One	2018	
Bertone Cadillac Villa	2005	
Bertone Fiat Barchetta	2007	
Bertone GT One	2018	
Bertone Mantide	2009	
Bertone Nuccio	2012	
Bertone Porsche Karisma	1994	
Bertone Porsche 911(996)	1992	
Bertone Porsche 911 2.0 Roadster	1966	
Bertone Porsche Boxster(986)	1992	
Bertone Pickster	1998	
Bertone Slim	2000	
Bertone Suagnà	2006	
Bertone BMW Spicup	1969	
Bertone BMW Garmisch	1970	
Bertone BMW Younique	2006	
Chevrolet Testudo	1963	
Chevrolet Nivola	1990	
Chevrolet Ramarro	1984	
Citroën GS Camargue	1972	
Citroën Zabrus	1986	
Ferrari 250 GT SWB Berlinetta Speciale	1959	
Ferrari 250 GT SWB Berlinetta Speciale	1962	
Ferrari Rainbow	1976	
Fiat 125 Executive	1967	
Fiat 127 Village	1974	
Fiat 128 Coupé	1969	
Fiat Cinquecento Rush	1992	
Fiat Punto Racer	1994	
Fiat Bravo Enduro	1996	
Ford Mustang Bertone	1965	
Innocenti 186 GT	1964	
Jaguar Ascot	1977	
Jaguar B99	2011	
Jaguar FT Coupé	1966	
Jaguar Pirana	1967	
Lamborghini Athon	1980	
Lamborghini Bravo	1974	
Lamborghini Genesis	1988	
Lamborghini Marzal	1967	
Lancia Kayak	1994	
Lancia Sibilo	1978	
Lancia Stratos Zero	1970	
Lancia Stratos HF prototype	1971	
Lotus Emotion	1991	
Maserati 5000 GT Bertone	1961	
Mazda MX-81	1981	
NSU Trapeze	1973	
Opel Filo	2001	
Opel Slalom	1996	
Saab Novanta	2002	
Suzuki Go	1972	
Volvo Tundra	1979	

Production cars
Model	Year	Image
Abarth 1000 GT Coupé	1958	
Alfa Romeo 1900 Sport Spider	1954	
Alfa Romeo 2000/2600 Sprint	1960	
Alfa Romeo 90	1984	
Alfa Romeo Giulia Sprint GT Veloce	1967	
Alfa Romeo Giulietta Sprint	1954	
Alfa Romeo Giulietta/Giulia Sprint Speciale	1960	
Alfa Romeo GT	2003	
Alfa Romeo Montreal	1970	
Arnolt-Aston Martin DB2/4 Spider	1954	
Arnolt-Bristol	1955	
Arnolt-MG	1953	
ASA 1000 GT	1962	
Bertone Freeclimber	1989	
Bertone GB110	2023	
Bertone Runabout	2026	
BMW 3200 CS	1962	
Changhe Ideal	2003	
Chery A1	2008	
Chevrolet Niva (restyling)	2009	
Citroën BX	1982	
Citroën Xantia	1993	
Citroën XM	1989	
Citroën ZX	1991	
Daewoo Espero	1990	
Ferrari 208/308 GT4	1974	
Fiat 1100 TV	1953	
Fiat 131 Abarth	1976	
Fiat 850 Spider	1965	
Fiat 8V Spider	1953	
Fiat Dino	1967	
Fiat X1/9	1972	
Fiat Ritmo Cabrio	1978	
Fiat Panda	2003	
Innocenti Mini	1974	
Iso Grifo	1965	
Iso Lele	1969	
Iso Rivolta IR	1962	
Lamborghini Countach	1971	
Lamborghini Espada	1968	
Lamborghini Jalpa	1981	
Lamborghini Jarama	1970	
Lamborghini Miura	1967	
Lamborghini Silhouette	1976	
Lamborghini Urraco	1970	
Lancia Stratos HF	1972	
Gordon-Keeble	1960	
Maserati Khamsin	1972	
Maserati Quattroporte II	1974	
Mazda Luce	1965	
Mercedes-Benz W126 Limousine	1981	
NSU Spider	1960	
NSU Sport Prinz	1959	
Opel Astra F Cabrio	1994	
Opel Astra G Cabrio	2001	
Opel Astra G Coupé	2001	
Opel Kadett E Cabrio	1987	
Riich G5	2009	
Simca 1000 Coupé	1962	
Simca 1200 S Coupé	1967	
Škoda Favorit	1987	
Stanguellini 1100 Berlinetta	1953	
Volvo 780	1985	

=== Motorcycle designs ===
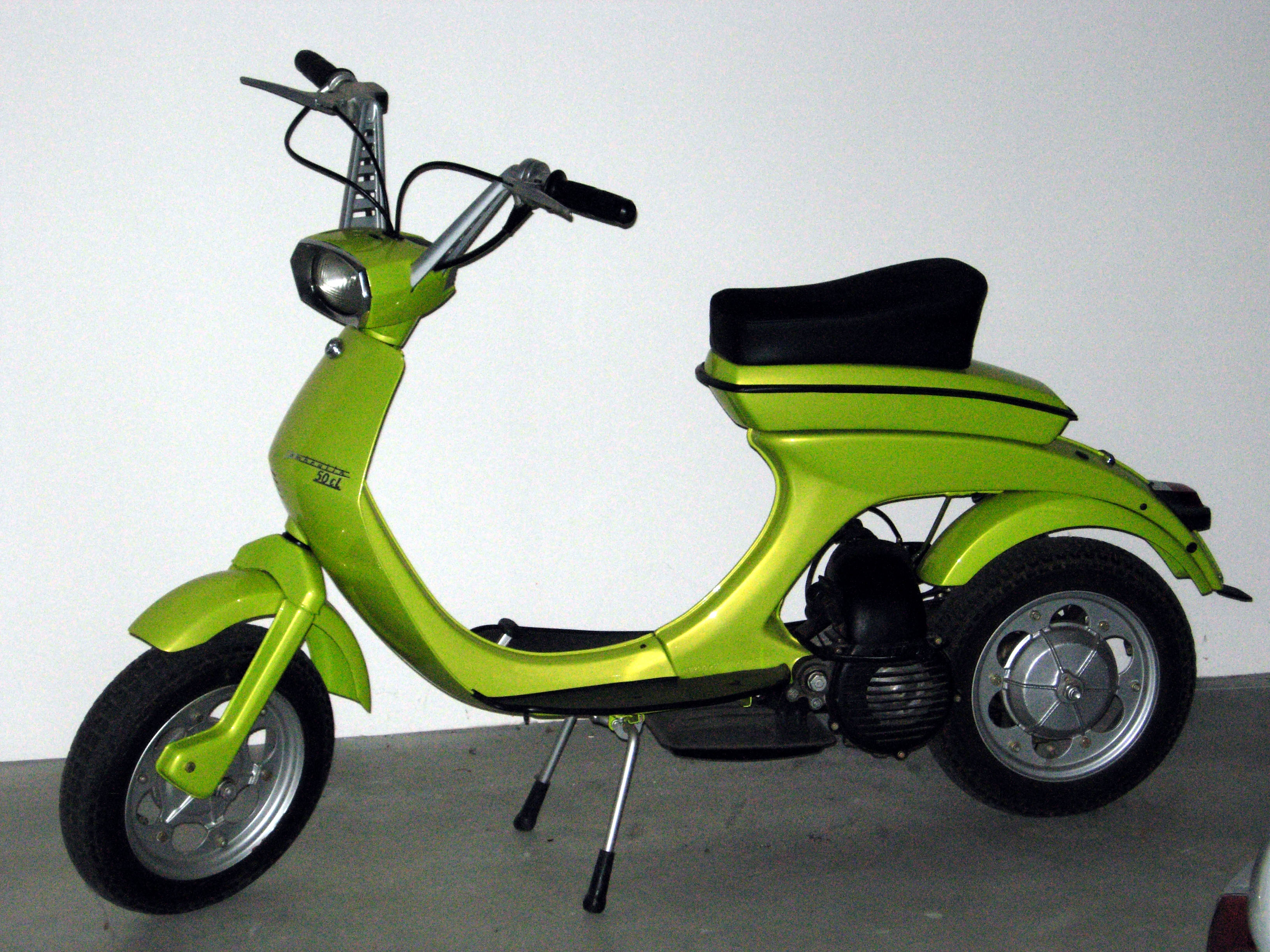
Lambretta Luna Range

- Lambretta Luna Range: Lui/Vega/Cometa (1968)
- Lambretta GP/DL (1969)

=== Vehicles produced by Bertone, but not of Bertone design ===
- BMW C1 (2000–2003)
- Fiat Punto Cabrio (1995–1999)
- Mini Cooper GP (2006)
- Volvo 262C (1977–1981)

== Notable designers ==
- Giovanni Bertone (1912–1945)
- Mario Revelli di Beaumont (1933–1954)
- Giovanni Michelotti (1950–1954)
- Franco Scaglione (1952–1959)
- Giorgetto Giugiaro (1959–1965)
- Marcello Gandini (1965–1979)
- Marc Deschamps (1970s–1974; 1979–1992)
- Luciano D'Ambrosio (1992–2001)
- Giuliano Biasio (1980–1990; 1997–2006)
- David Wilkie (2007–2008)
- Jason Castriota (2008–2009)
- Michael Vernon Robinson (2009–2013)
