= Bertone Blitz =

1992 electric sports car

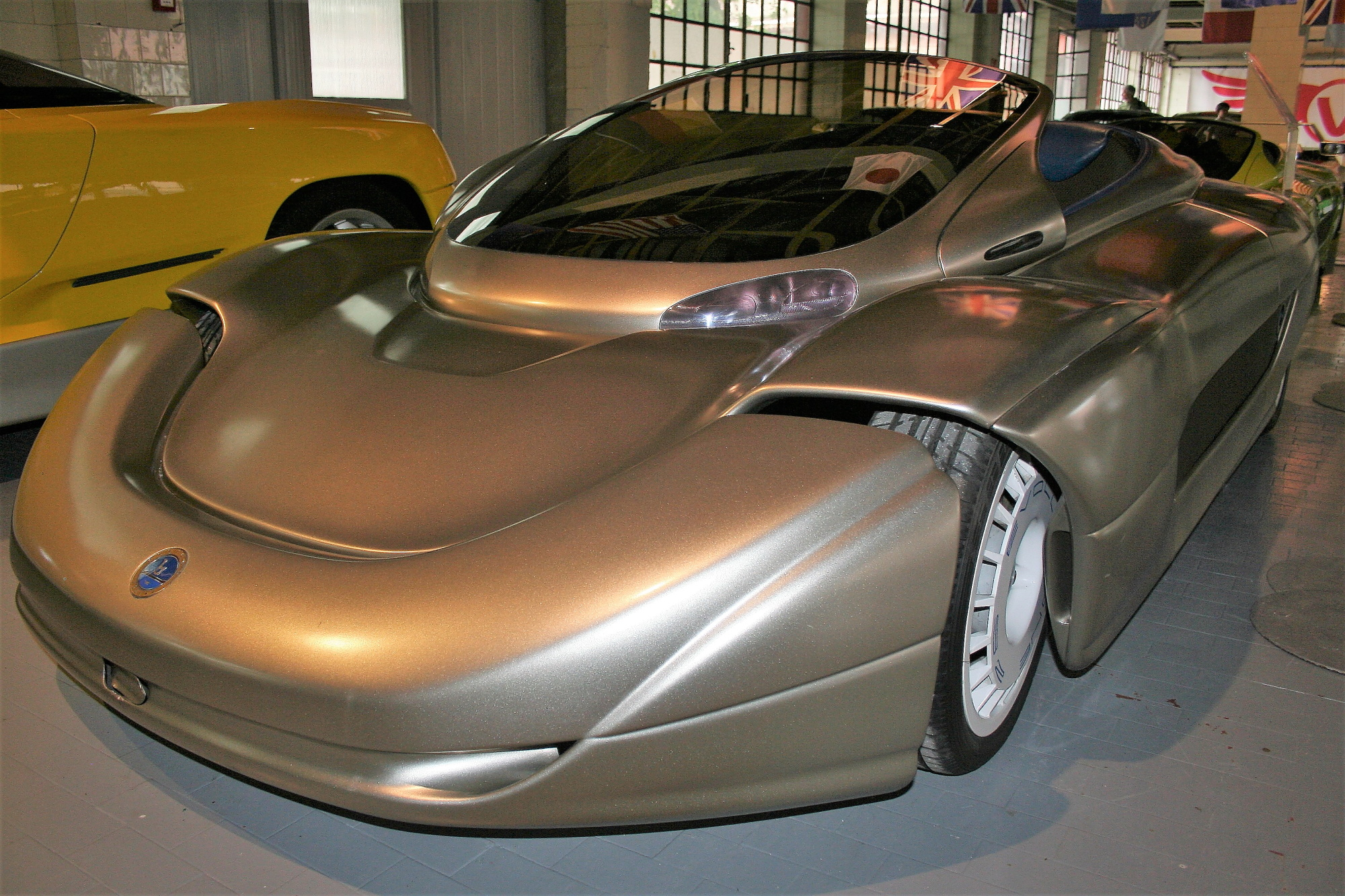
- Bertone Blitz at the Bertone ASI museum outside Milan

Overview
- Manufacturer: Bertone
- Production: 1992 (2 made)
- Designer: Luciano D'Ambrosio at Bertone

Body and chassis
- Class: Concept car

The Bertone Blitz is an electric concept car produced in 1992 by the Italian design house Bertone and introduced at the 1992 Turin Auto Show.

== Specifications ==
The Blitz is built on a steel tube frame chassis with fiberglass panels over top, giving it a weight of 650 kg (1,430 lb), 260 kg (570 lb) of which is the lead acid batteries. It features an open top, two seater layout with the passenger seat mounted to the side, but offset back, from the driver seat. The interior is made from carbon fiber, with the seats being integrated into the tub, fitted with small pieces of colorful padding over top. The Blitz is powered by two 36 hp (27 kW) (continuous output) DC motors for a combined total of 56 kW (75 hp) and 95 Nm (70 ft·lbf) of torque, reportedly allowing it to accelerate from 0 to 62 mph (0 to 100 km/h) in 6 seconds. It has a range of 62 mi (100 km) on a single charge and it can be recharged within 4 to 6 hours.

== Gallery ==
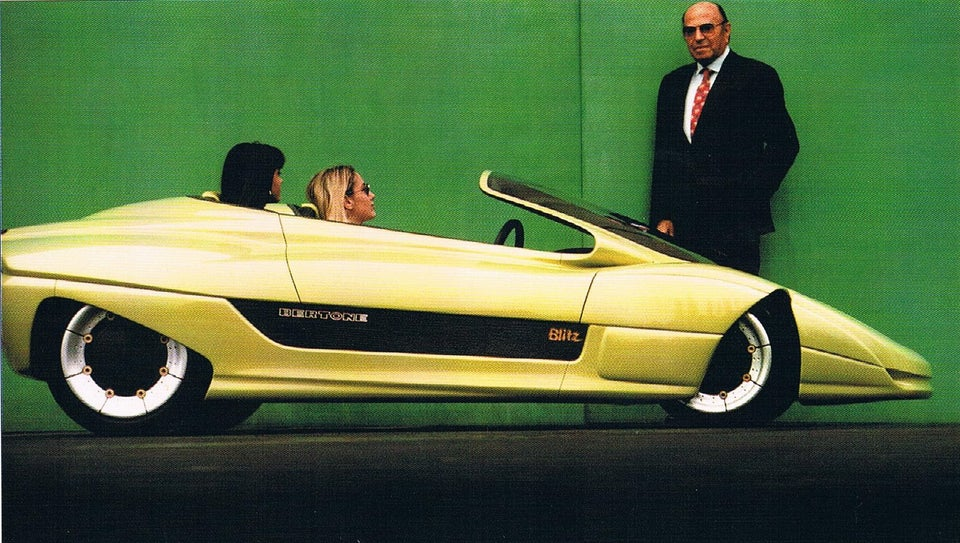
The second Bertone Blitz, finished in green

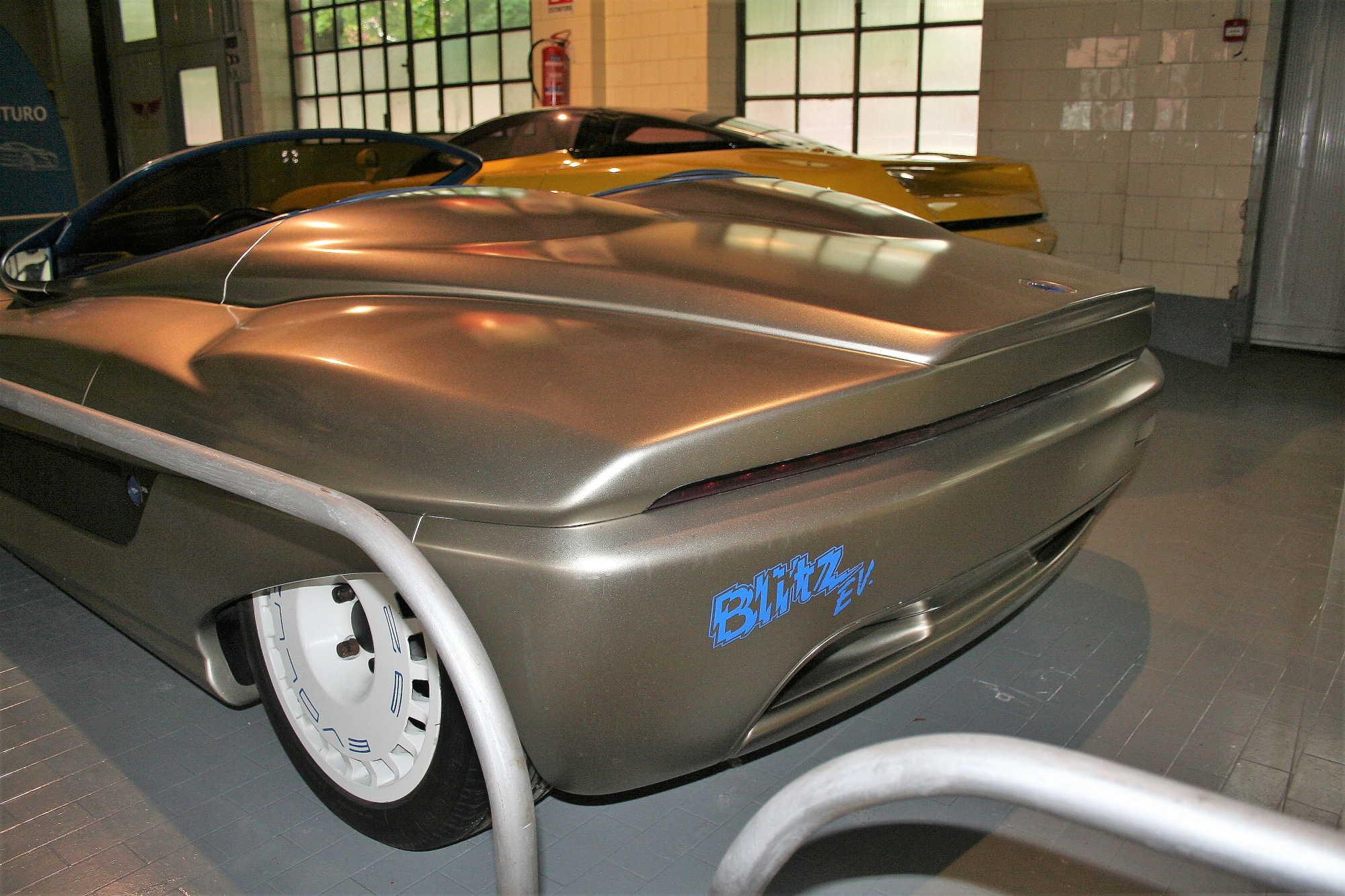
Rear view
