= Rétromobile =

Annual classic auto show held in Paris, France

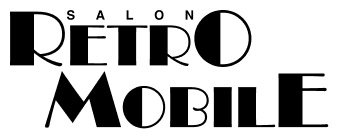
Rétromobile Logo

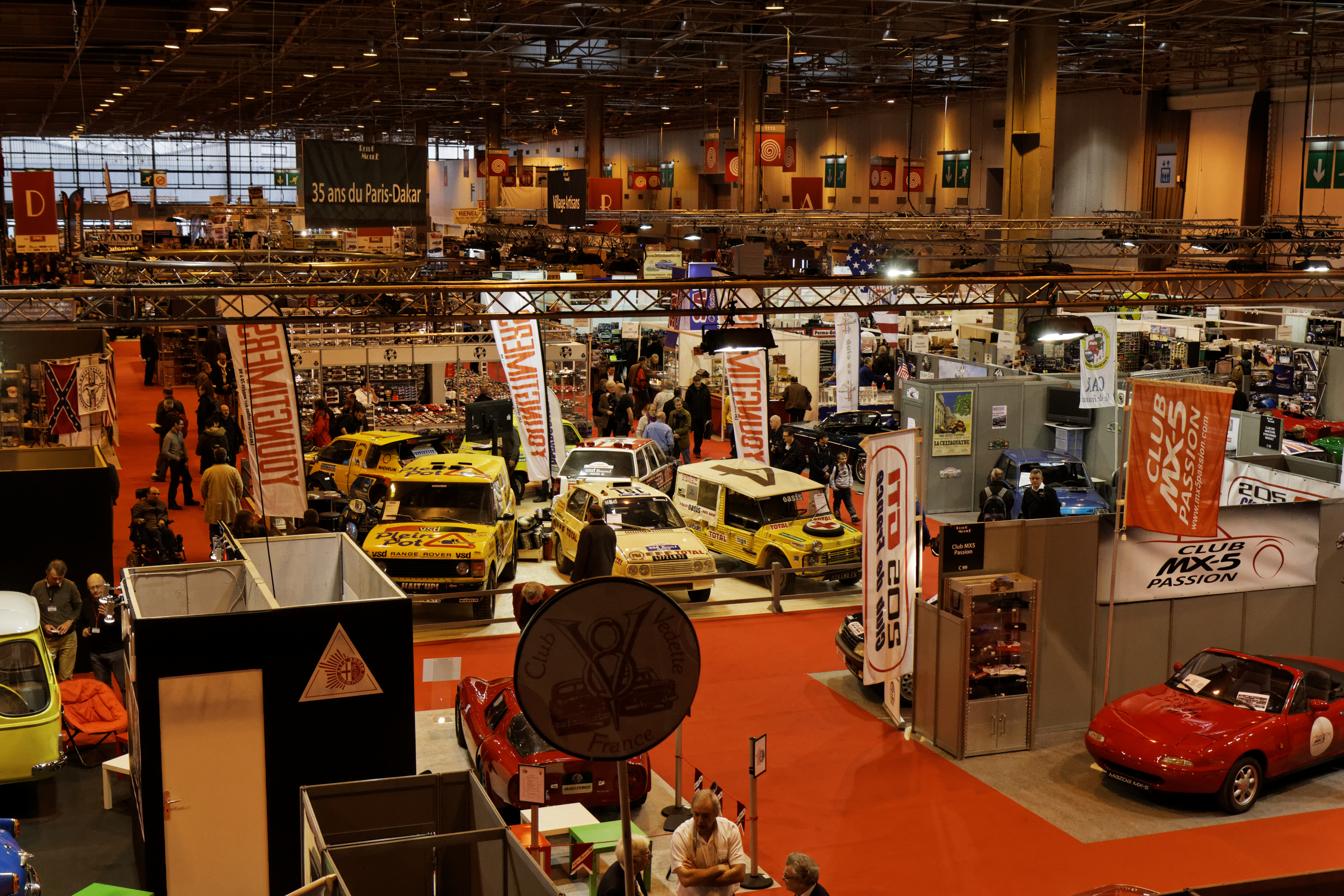
Rétromobile 2014 - view of hall

Rétromobile is an annual classic auto show held in February in the French city of Paris. First held in 1976, the show is hosted at the Paris expo Porte de Versailles, a convention centre located between the Boulevards of the Marshals and the Boulevard Périphérique. Traditionally the first major classic car show of the year. Rétromobile is also the location of a classic car auction.
