= Nuccio Bertone =

Italian automobile designer (1914–1997)

Giovanni Bertone (left) with his son Giuseppe "Nuccio" Bertone (right)

Giuseppe Bertone, also called "Nuccio", (4 July 1914, in Turin – 26 February 1997, in Turin) was an automobile designer and constructor. He took over Carrozzeria Bertone from his father, Giovanni after World War II, growing the small business to a car building and designing powerhouse. After racing Fiat, O.S.C.A., Maserati, and Ferrari, Bertone moved to construction, agreeing to build his first car, a series of 200 MGs, at the 1952 Turin Motor Show. He drew attention at the Paris Motor Show that year with an Abarth concept, and was chosen to design the replacement for the Alfa Romeo Disco Volante. These so-called BAT (Berlina Aerodinamica Tecnica) cars used the Alfa Romeo 1900 Sprint chassis. Bertone is also responsible for designing the famous Lambretta GP/DL range of scooters and the Luna line of scooters.

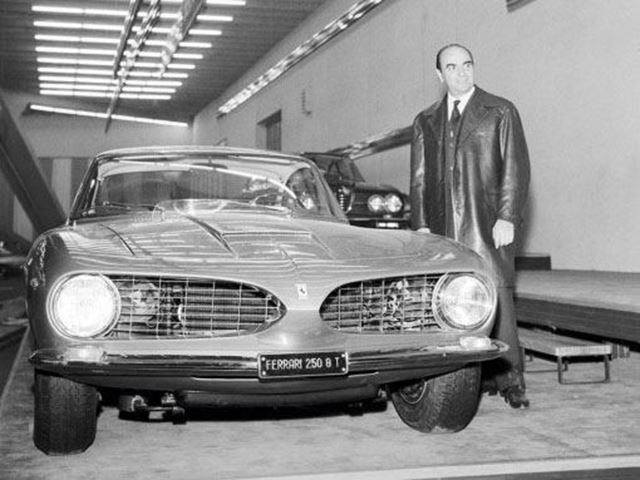
Nuccio Bertone with the 1962 Ferrari 250 GT SWB Bertone designed by Giorgetto Giugiaro

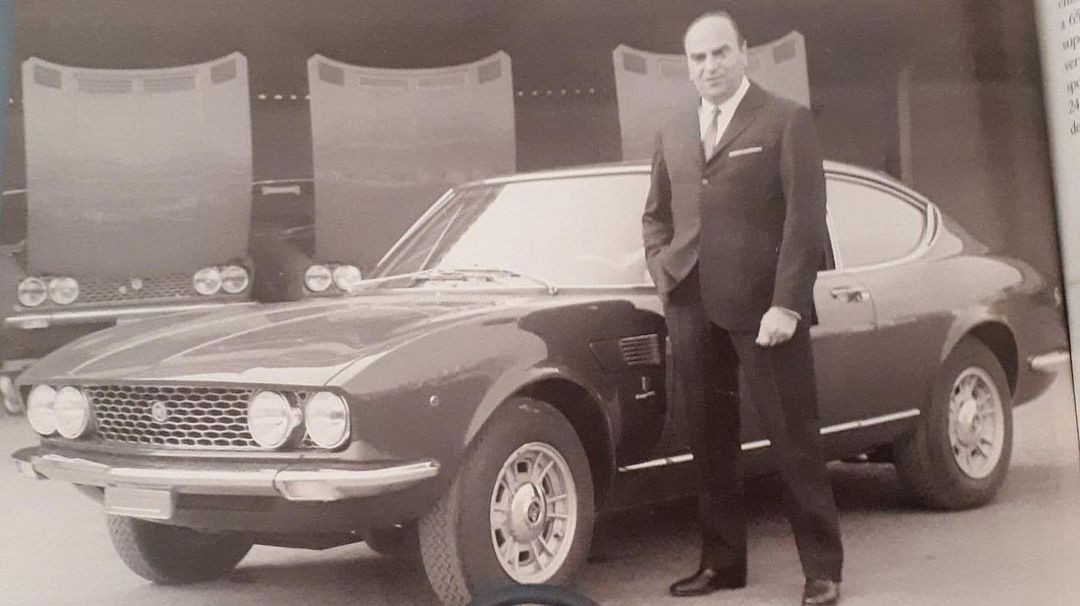
Nuccio Bertone with a 1967 Fiat Dino (designed by Giugiaro and Gandini)

Two years later at Turin, Bertone introduced the Storm Z concept based on a Dodge chassis alongside his latest BAT concept and a prototype of the Alfa Romeo Giulietta Sprint, which would become the company's main product for the coming years. Bertone built more than 31,000 bodies in 1960, including Fiat 850 Spiders, Fiat Dinos, Simca 1200S coupes, the Alfa Romeo Montreal, and Lamborghinis. His 100th design was a special Ford Mustang, introduced at the 1965 New York Auto Show and commissioned by Automobile Quarterly. From 1972 to 1989 built the Fiat X1/9.

Bertone summed up his philosophy when introducing the Fiat 850:

"Our role is the production of car bodywork on which we impose the styling trends, build prototypes, develop the design, the production methods, and the tooling. Naturally, we produce them in quantity."

When Bertone designed Ferraris, penned by Giorgetto Giugiaro, this was a radical departure for Ferrari that drew the ire of rival design house Pininfarina, which Ferrari had so far often worked with. However, his two 250 GT SWBs only foreshadowed the controversial Dino 308 GT4 of the 1970s, designed by Marcello Gandini, who had by that time designed several stand-out models for Ferrari's rival Lamborghini.

Bertone was inducted into the Automotive Hall of Fame in 2006. and the European Automotive Hall of Fame. He was married to Lilli and had two daughters.
