= Volvo Elisabeth I =

The Volvo Elisabeth I was a concept car designed by Giovanni Michelotti and built by Vignale sometime in 1953, on the chassis of a Volvo P445.

The lines are recognizable in the later Amazon, but the Elisabeth has a small triangular grille, similar to one on an Alfa Romeo. The man behind the project was the businessman Gösta Wennberg, who made official contact with Michelotti in Paris in 1952. Michelotti was supposed to design the bodywork of a car to be built by Ghia Aigle, but the drawings came from Vignale instead. The work itself took place mainly at Carrozzeria Allemano located in Turin not too far from Vignale.

Because of the construction of the chassis, there was no space for any back seats. This was probably one of the main reasons for Volvo's lack of interest in serial production of Elisabeth I, which had been Wennberg's original intention with the project. The one-off car was crashed sometime in the beginning of the 1960s.
