= Jowett Jupiter =

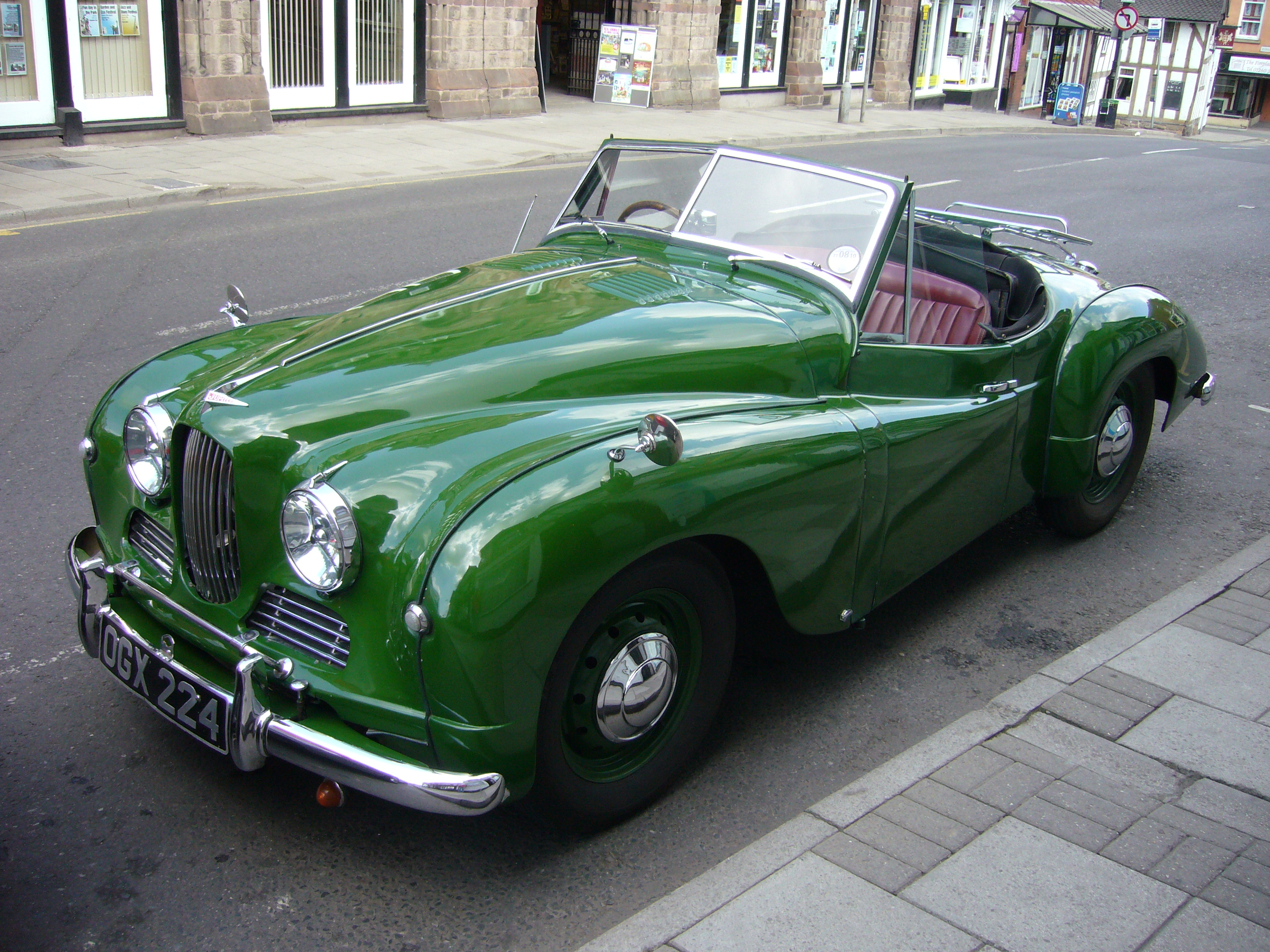

Overview
- Manufacturer: Jowett Cars Ltd
- Also called: Jowett Javelin Jupiter
- Production: 1950–1954. about 900 made
- Designer: Reg Korner (exterior design); Robert Eberan-Eberhorst (chassis)

Body and chassis
- Class: Sports car
- Body style: 2-seater drophead coupé wind-up windows

Powertrain
- Engine: 1486 cc Jowett flat four
- Transmission: 4-speed manual

Dimensions
- Wheelbase: 93 in (2,400 mm)
- Length: Series 1: 163 in (4,100 mm); Series 1a: 168 in (4,300 mm)
- Width: 62 in (1,600 mm)
- Height: 56 in (1,400 mm)
- Curb weight: 2,100 lb (953 kg)

The Jowett Jupiter is a British sports car which was produced by Jowett Cars Ltd of Idle, near Bradford.

Following the launch of the all new Jowett Javelin and its successes in competition, Jowett decided to use its powertrain in a sports car for export in the hope of increasing their inadequate steel allocation.

The chassis only was displayed in October at the London Motor Show, which opened 28 September 1949, and the complete car for the first time in New York in April 1950. Again, the chassis only was given its continental launch at the Geneva Motor Show which opened 16 March 1950. Initially, the car was known as the Jowett Javelin Jupiter. However, the Javelin part of the name was dropped in February 1951. It continued in production until 1954.

== Design features ==
Jowett through Lawrence Pomeroy of The Motor joined forces with ERA and they persuaded Eberan von Eberhorst, formerly with Auto Union, to come to England. He joined ERA in Dunstable and, amongst other projected development and chassis work, designed and developed what became the Jupiter's tubular steel chassis. The suspension used soft torsion bars and anti-roll bars front and rear with independent suspension at the front. The engine was mounted very far forward ahead of the front axle line with the radiator low behind it over the gearbox. Adjustment of the anti-roll bars easily influenced oversteer and understeer to provide fine suspension tuning. On this torsionally stiff frame, Reg Korner of Jowett put a steel-framed aluminium drophead coupé body with a bench seat for three people. Eberan's chassis had been designed for a closed coupé and it proved to require strengthening. The anti-roll bars were abandoned. There was no external access to the boot (trunk) and the bonnet (hood) was rear-hinged and opened complete with the wings. These cars were only for export; it was hoped coachbuilders would supply the local market.

An initial 75 chassis were supplied to external coachbuilders such as Stabilimenti Farina, Ghia Suisse, Abbott of Farnham and others in Britain. The high cost of these, mostly handsome, bodies for what was only a 1500 c.c. car obliged Jowett to build their own complete cars. The Jowett factory made 731 Mk1 and 94 Mk1a cars. The Mk 1a came out in late 1952 with a little more power (63 bhp) and an opening lid to a boot of larger capacity.

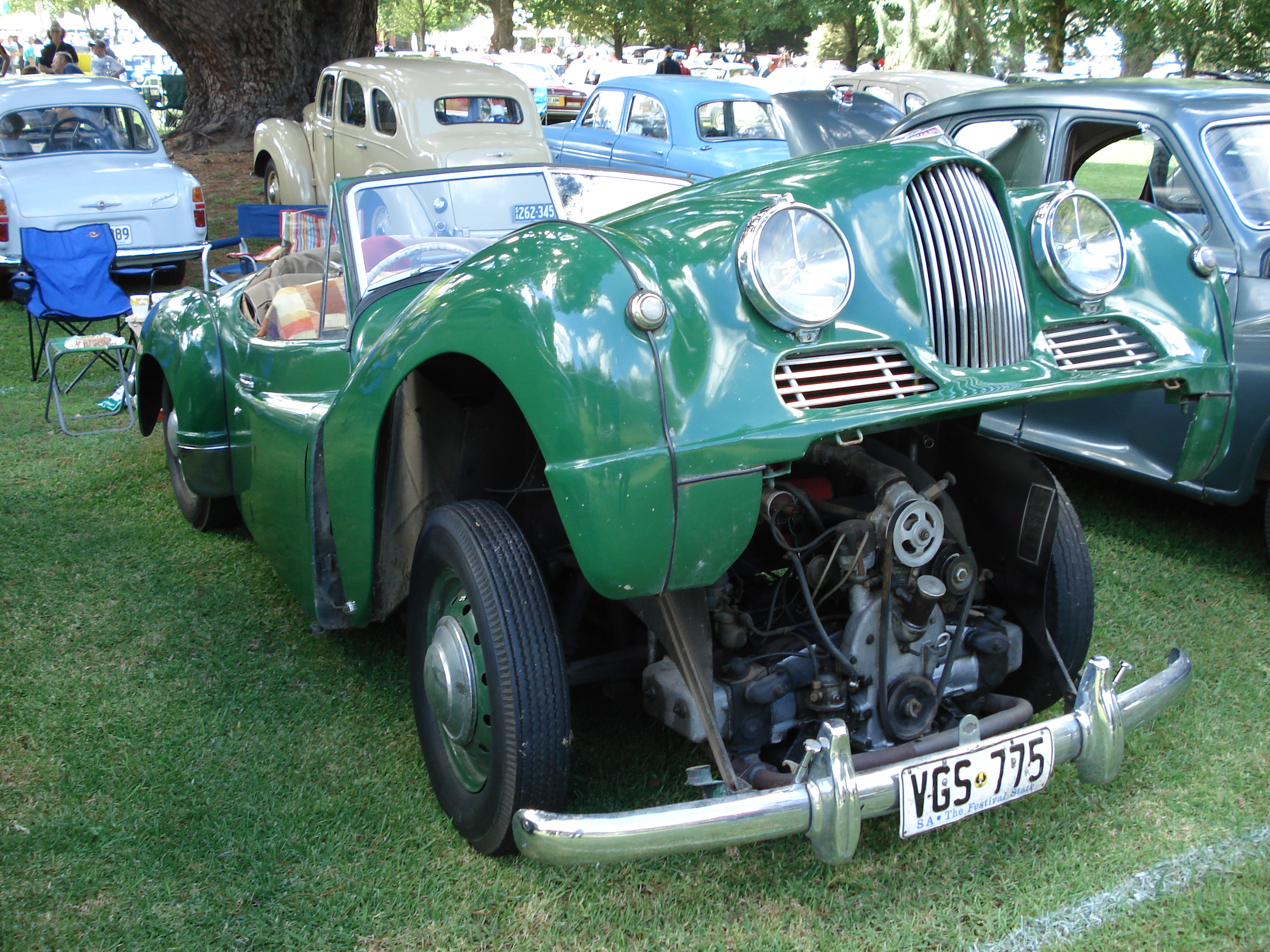
Jowett Jupiter with open bonnet

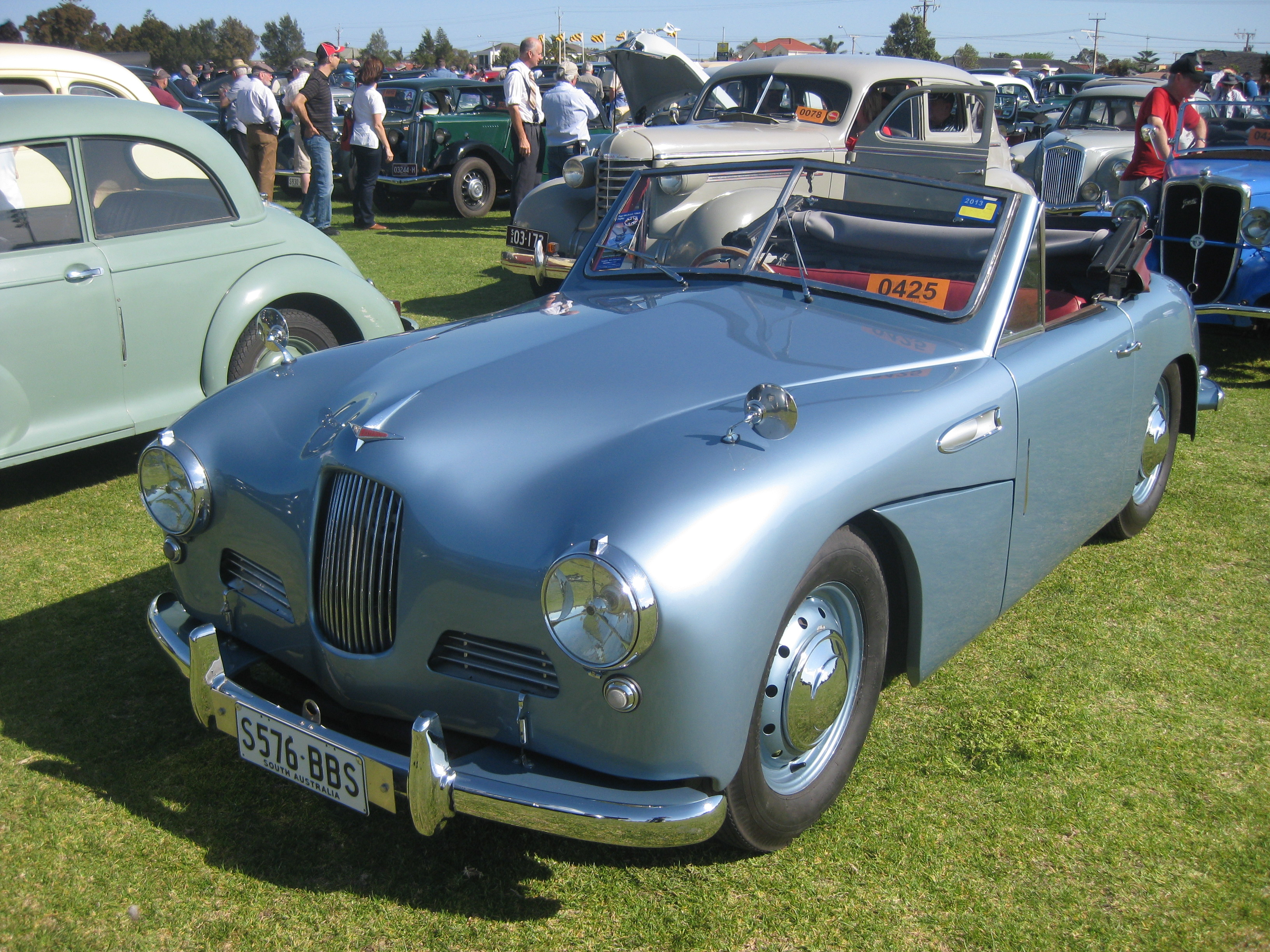
Jowett Jupiter with body by coachbuilder Richard Mead of Dorridge, Warwickshire. One of six built.

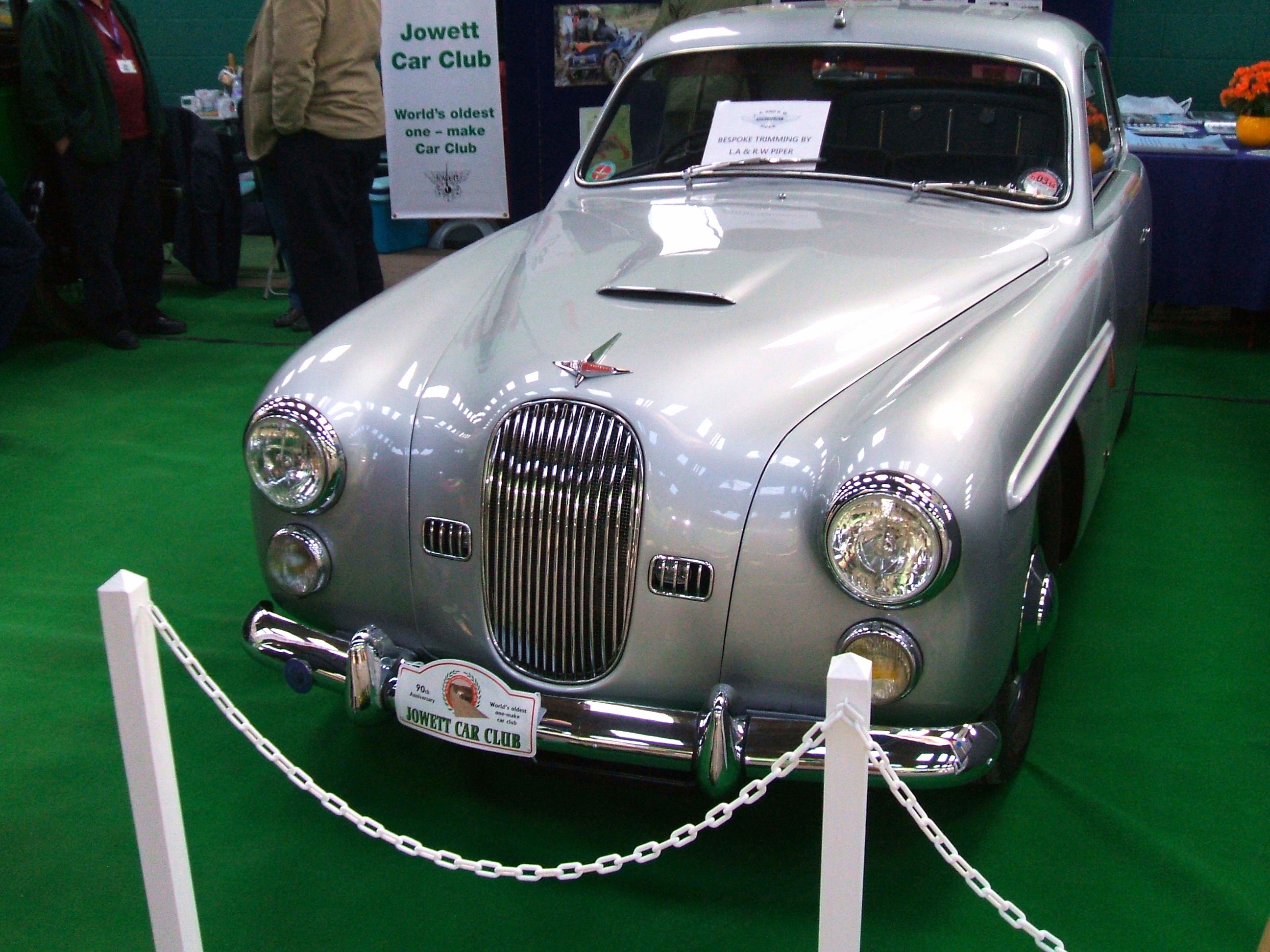
Jowett Jupiter by Stabilimenti Farina

== Powertrain ==
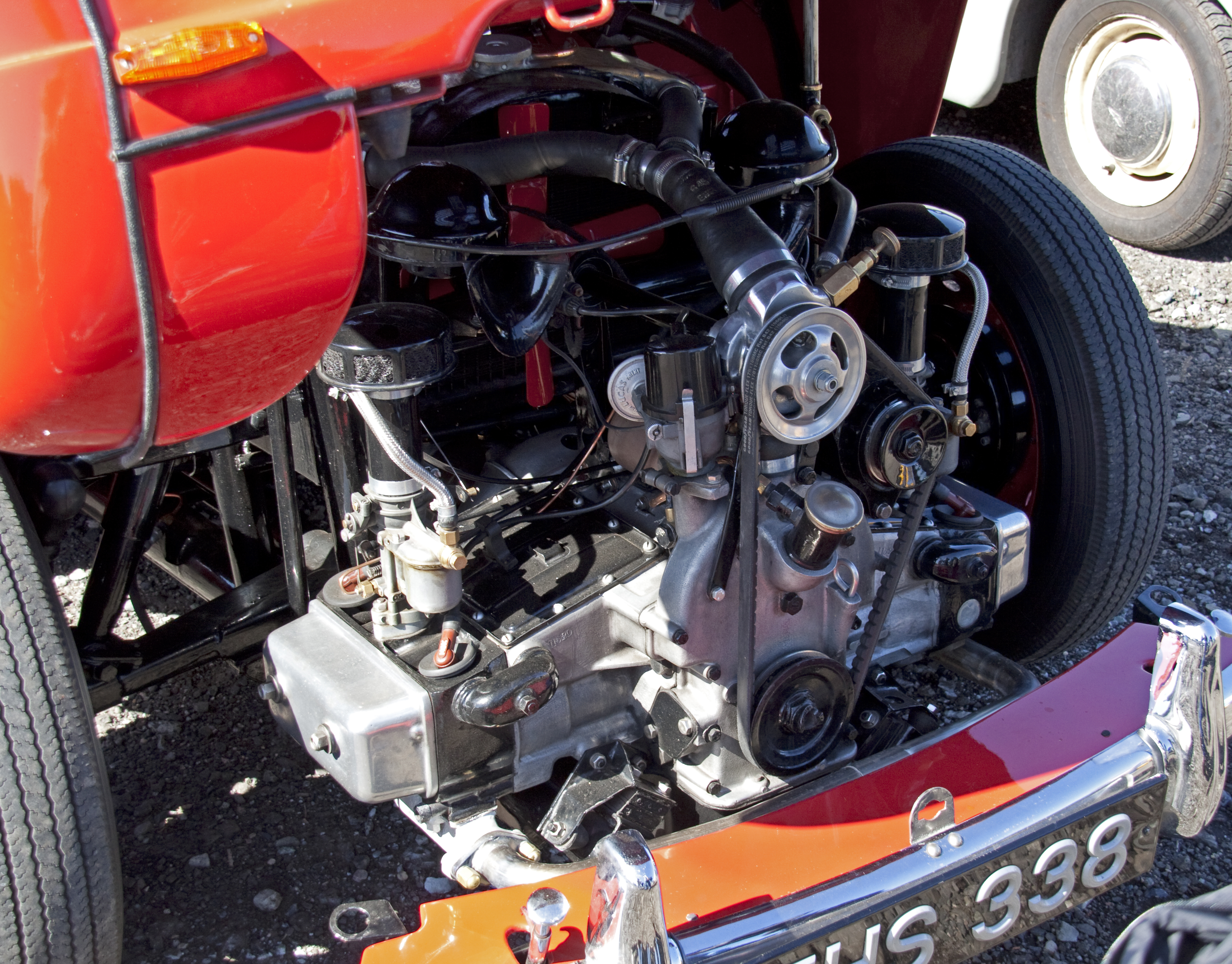
Under the bonnet of a Jupiter

The flat four overhead valve engine of 1486 cc was more highly tuned than in the Javelin and had its compression ratio raised from 7.2:1 to 8.0:1, developing 60 bhp (45 kW) at 4500 rpm and giving the car a maximum speed of 85 mph (137 km/h) and a 0-50 mph time of 11.7 seconds. Two Zenith carburettors were fitted. A four speed gearbox with column change was used.

== Motorsport ==
The Jupiter achieved competition success with a record-breaking class win at the 1950 Le Mans 24 Hour race, a class one-two in the 1951 Monte Carlo International Rally, an outright win in the 1951 Lisbon International Rally, and a class one-two in a gruelling four-hour sports car race on the public road at Dundrod Circuit in Northern Ireland in September 1951. This was a resurrection of the famous Ulster Tourist Trophy races of 1928-1936 previously run on the 13.7-mile (22.0 km) Ards circuit. Le Mans was again class-won in 1951 and 1952, and lesser events were taken in 1952 but by 1953 newer faster cars were proving a match for the Jupiter which was after all a well-appointed touring car first and foremost.

== Contemporary road tests ==
A car tested by the British magazine The Motor in 1950 had a top speed of 86.1 mph (138.6 km/h) and could accelerate from 0-60 mph (97 km/h) in 18.0 seconds. A fuel consumption of 25.1 miles per imperial gallon (11.3 L/100 km; 20.9 mpg_{‑US}) was recorded. The test car cost £1086 including taxes. At this time a Jaguar XK120 cost £1263 including taxes when tested by the same magazine.

A road test by the competitor magazine, The Autocar recorded a top speed of 90 mph (145 km/h) but acceleration to 60 mph (97 km/h) for these testers took them to 20.4 seconds. The final drive ratio on the first publicly presented prototype of 4.1 to 1 was reduced to 4.56 to 1 and it is possible that the final drive on the tested cars was not the same. The Autocar testers were enthusiastic about the car's performance, especially in view of the "well-known ... verve of the Javelin engine" and its "susceptibility to power output increase". The Jupiter's compression ratio of 8:1 was nevertheless higher than on most UK market cars in 1950, and some mild "pinging" was recorded using 72 octane fuel, which was the highest grade normally available in Britain at the time. Other features drawing particular praise included quick, light though highly-geared steering and gear-change linkage which was "unusually positive for a steering column layout".

== Jupiter R1 ==
A racing derivative of the Jupiter, the R1, was entered in the 1951 1500 cc sports car race at Watkins Glen, driven to first place by George Weaver. In the 1952 24 Hours of Le Mans another example won its class at 13th overall, driven by Marcel Becquart and Gordon Wilkins. Three examples of the R1 were made - one survives.

== Jupiter R4 ==
The original Jupiter was a somewhat heavy car and this handicapped its performance. An intended successor, the R4, was made with fibreglass body and a new lighter chassis and showed the potential of being a genuine 100 mph (161 km/h) car but Jowett closed before the car could reach production. Three prototypes were made of which two survive.

== Popular culture ==
- In Raymond Chandler's The Long Goodbye, Terry Lennox drives a Jowett Jupiter (described as "a rust-colored Jupiter-Jowett with a flimsy canvas rain top under which there was only just room for the two of us").
