= Alfa Romeo 1900 =

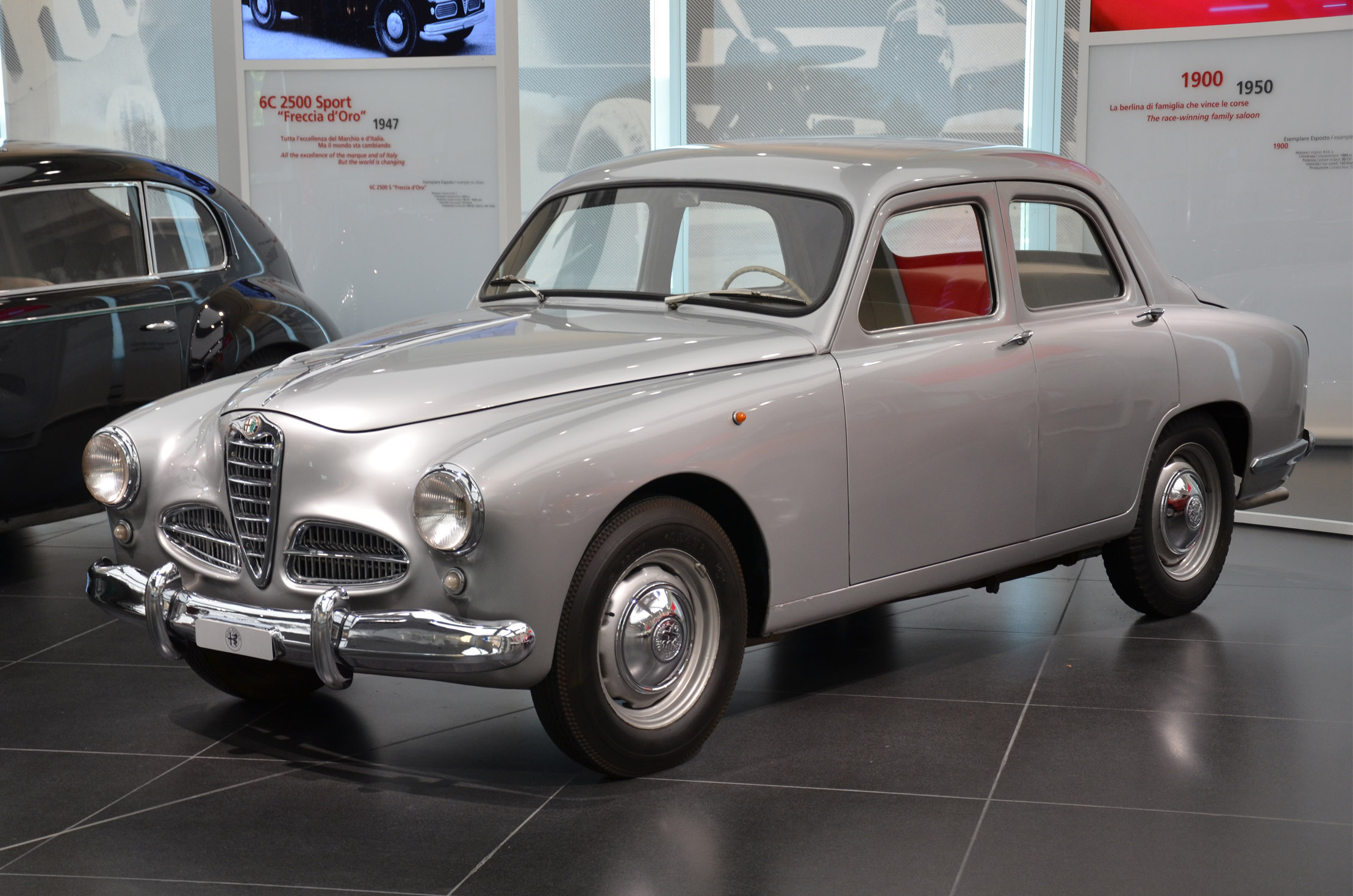
- 1950 Alfa Romeo 1900

Overview
- Manufacturer: Alfa Romeo
- Production: 1950–1959
- Assembly: Italy: Portello Plant, Milan; Belgium: Nessonvaux, Liege (S.A. Impéria: 1953–1954)
- Designer: Orazio Satta

Body and chassis
- Body style: 4-door saloon (Berlina); 2-door coupé (Sprint); 2-door convertible
- Layout: Front-engine, rear-wheel-drive
- Related: Alfa Romeo Matta; Alfa Romeo 2000 Sportiva; Alfa Romeo BAT; IKA Bergantín

Powertrain
- Engine: 1.9 L tipo 1306 DOHC I4; 2.0 L tipo 1308 DOHC I4
- Transmission: 4- and 5-speed manual

Dimensions
- Wheelbase: Berlina/Sprint; 2,630 mm (103.5 in)/2,500 mm (98.4 in); 2,500 mm (98.4 in) (1900C)
- Length: 4,400 mm (173.2 in)/4,400 mm (173.2 in)
- Width: 1,600 mm (63.0 in)/1,630 mm (64.2 in)
- Height: 1,490 mm (58.7 in)/1,350 mm (53.1 in)
- Kerb weight: 900–1,100 kg (2,000–2,400 lb)

Chronology
- Predecessor: Alfa Romeo 6C 2500
- Successor: Alfa Romeo 2000

The Alfa Romeo 1900 is an automobile produced by Italian car manufacturer Alfa Romeo from 1950 until 1959. Designed by Orazio Satta, it was an important development for Alfa Romeo as the marque's first car built entirely on a production line and first production car without a separate chassis. It was also the first Alfa Romeo offered with left-hand drive. The car was introduced at the 1950 Paris Motor Show.

== 1900 Berlina and Sprint ==
The 1900 was offered in two-door or four-door models, with a new 1,884 cc (bore 82.55 mm (3.3 in), stroke 88 mm (3.5 in)), 90 hp (66 kW), four-cylinder twin cam engine. It was spacious and simple, yet quick and sporty. The slogan Alfa used when selling it was "The family car that wins races", not-so-subtly alluding to the car's success in the Targa Florio, Stella Alpina, and other competitions. In 1951, the short wheelbase 1900C (c for corto (Italian for short)) version was introduced. It had a wheelbase of 2,500 mm (98.4 in). In the same year, the 1900 TI with a more powerful 100 hp (74 kW) engine was introduced; it had bigger valves, a higher compression ratio, and was equipped with two twin choke carburetors. Two years later, the 1900 Super and 1900 TI Super (also 1900 Super Sprint) with a 1975 cc engine were introduced (bore increased to 84.5 mm (3.3 in), stroke unchanged). The larger engine size increased the power output to 115 hp (85 kW). Transmission was a 4-speed manual on basic versions and 5-speed manual in Super Sprint version, the brakes were drum brakes. The 1900 had independent front suspension (double wishbones, coil springs and hydraulic telescopic shock absorbers) and live rear axle. The first of the 1900 came fitted with 6.00-16 Pirelli Stella Bianca, and then in 1952 moved to the radial 165HR400 Pirelli Cinturato.

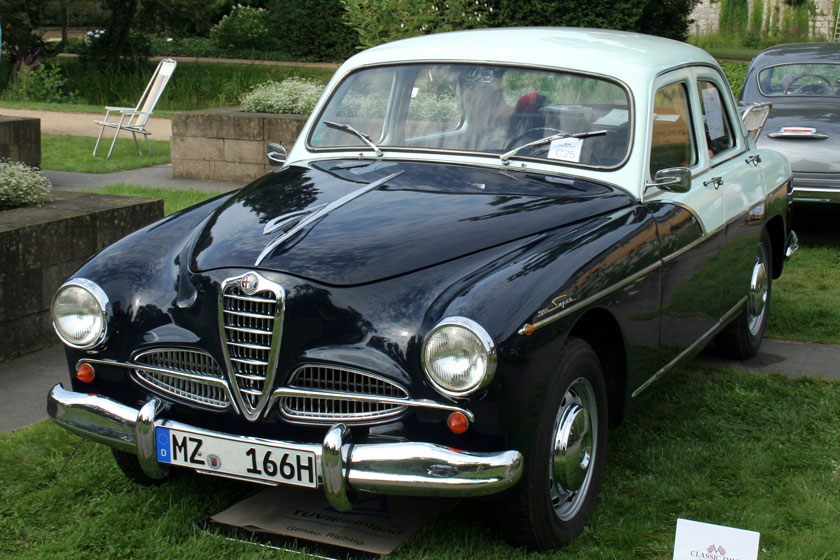
1956 1900 Super

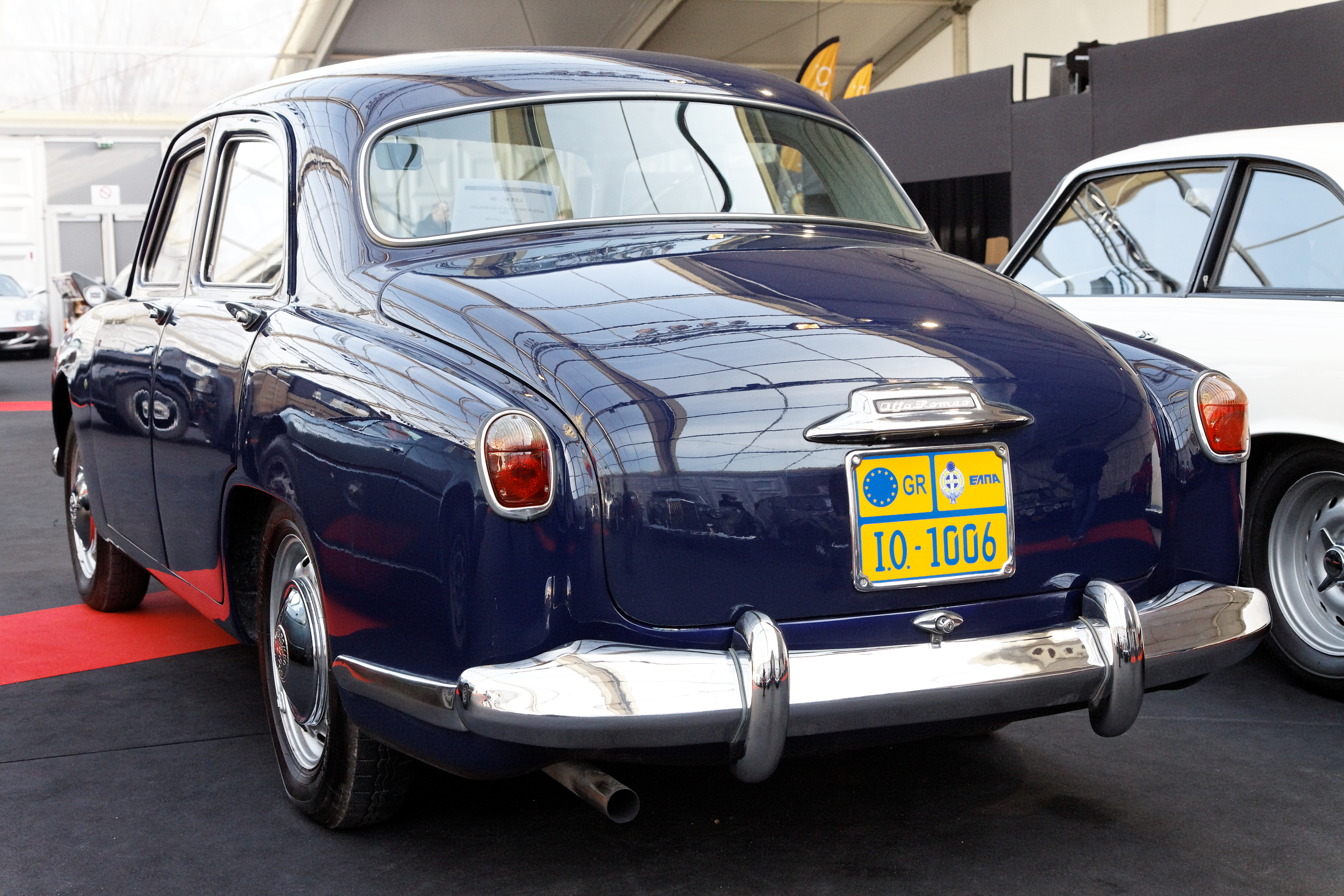
1954 1900 Super

Production at the company's Milan plant continued until 1959: a total of 21,304 were built, including 17,390 of the saloons.

The chassis was designed specifically to allow coachbuilders to rebody it, the most notable of which was the Zagato designed, 1900 Super Sprint coupé, with an improved engine and custom body design. The Alfa Romeo 1900M AR51 (or "Matta") is a four-wheel drive off-road vehicle based on the 1900-series.

== Coachbuilt versions ==
Iginio Alessio, then general manager of Alfa Romeo, was concerned for the viability of the independent Italian Coachbuilding industry–the advent of the unibody chassis design was threatening to put the carrozzerie out of business. Alessio was also a personal friend of Gaetano Ponzoni co-owner of Carrozzeria Touring Superleggera, thus from 1951 to 1958 Alfa Romeo built five different variations of the 1900 unibody chassis specifically for independent coachbuilders.

Alfa Romeo gave official contracts to Touring to build the sporty 1900 Sprint Coupé and to Pinin Farina to build an elegant four seat Cabriolet and Coupé. The availability of a suitable chassis led to many other coachbuilders to build versions of the 1900.

Carrozzeria Zagato built a small series of coupés with the unofficial designation of 1900 SSZ, designed for racing with an aerodynamic lightweight aluminium body and Zagato's trademark double bubble roof.

One-off specials were numerous, from the famous Bertone BAT series of aerodynamic studies, to an infamous sci-fi like Astral spider designed by Carrozzeria Boneschi for Rafael Trujillo the dictator of the Dominican Republic. There was a Barchetta or "Boat Car" made by Ghia-Aigle in Lugano Switzerland designed by Giovanni Michelotti at the request of a wealthy Italian who had two passions: Riva boats and his mistress; the car has no doors or windscreen wipers.

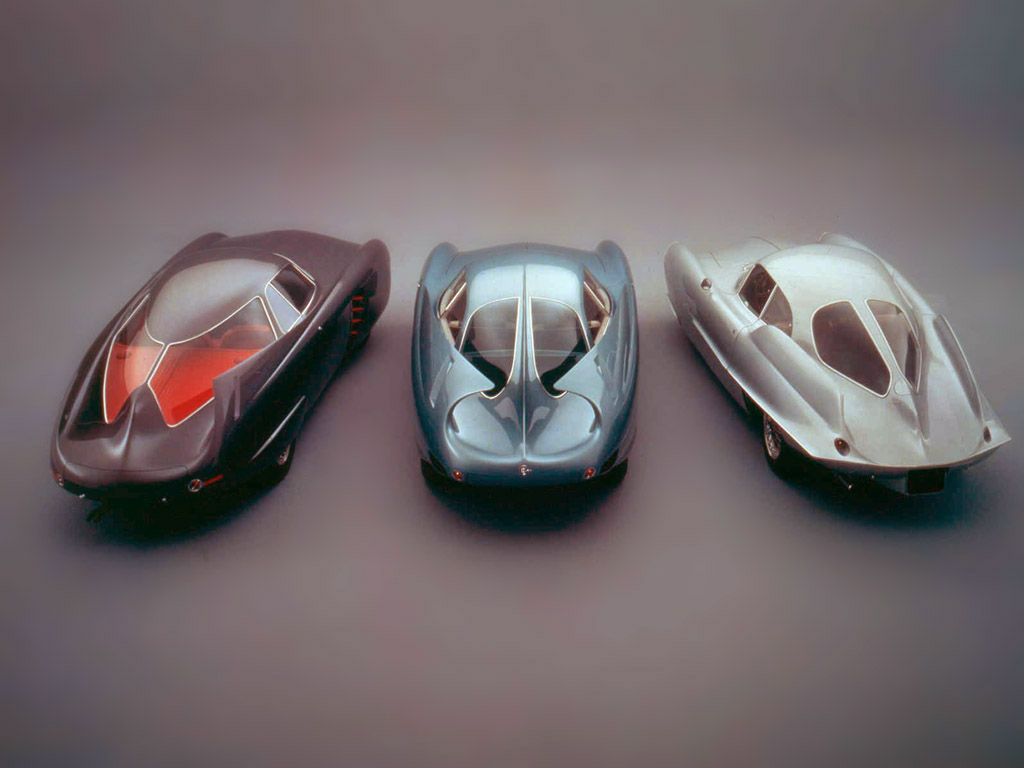
The Alfa Romeo BAT concept cars, all based on Alfa Romeo 1900 chassis

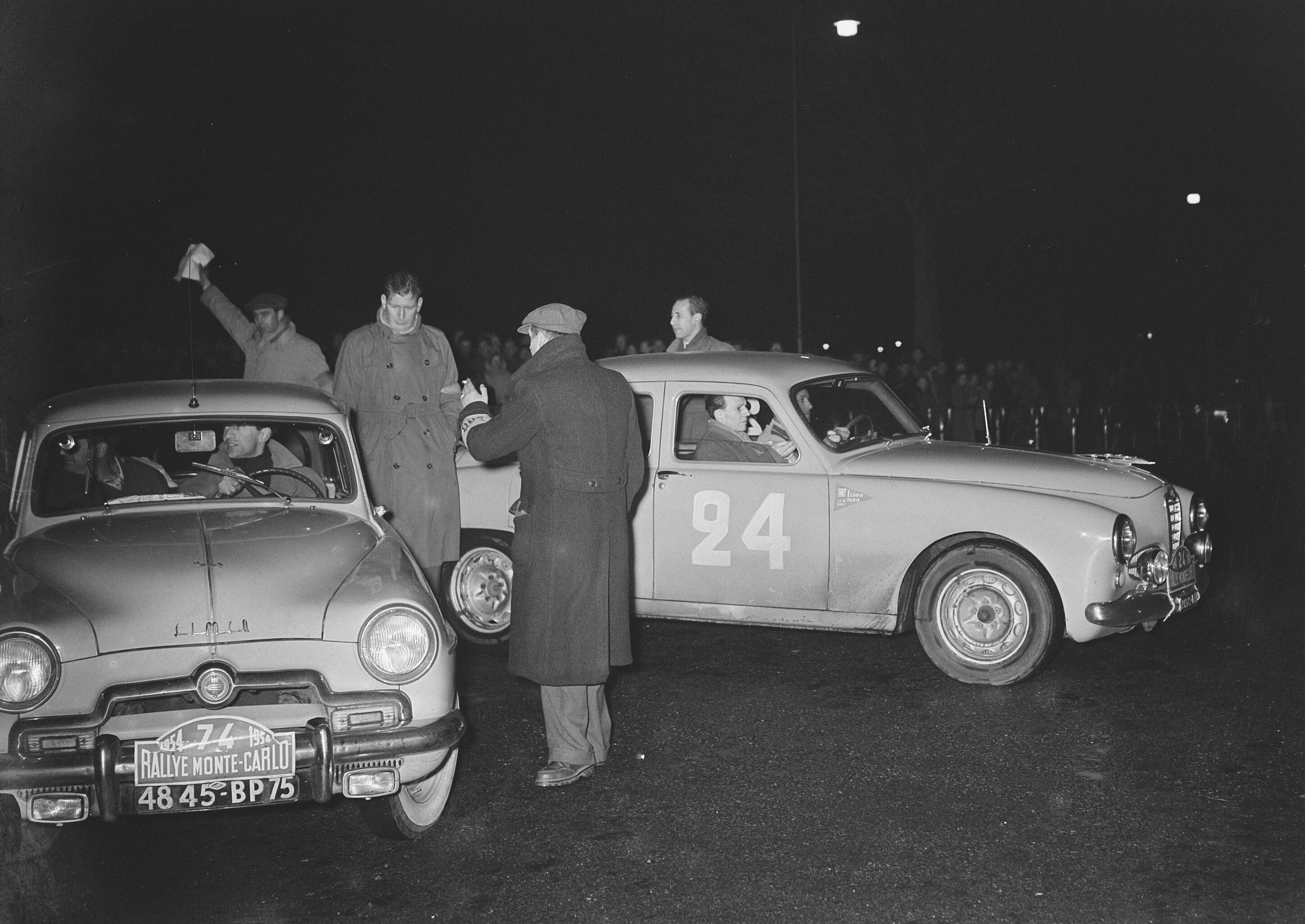
Entry #74 at the 1954 Rallye Monte Carlo was a Simca Aronde (French license "48 45 BP 75") entered by De Kluguenau and Mathieu. Entry #24 (in the right) is an Alfa Romeo 1900 entered by Georges Houel and Quinlin Julio, finished 10th.

Below is a list of coachbuilt Alfa Romeo 1900s.

Year	Coachbuilder	Model	Quantity
1951	Touring	Sprint 2+2	circa 800
–	Pinin Farina	4 seat Coupé	1
1952	Zagato	SSZ	39
1957	Zagato	SSZ Spyder	2
1953	Touring	Corto Gara	11 (incl. 3 Stradale)
1955	Touring	"tipo 55" coupé 2 seater.	1
1955	Touring	"tipo 55" cabriolet 2 seater.	1
1956	Touring	"1966 Series" Super Sprint 2 seater.	–
1957	Touring	"1966 Series" Cabriolet 2+2	1
1952	Pinin Farina	Cabriolet	88
1952	Pinin Farina	Coupé	100
1953	Pinin Farina	Coupé	1
1952	Pinin Farina	TI Coupé	1-2
1953	Boneschi	Astral spider	2
1955	Boano	Primavera Coupé	–
1955	Boano	SS Coupé	–
–	Boano	Coupé Tipo3	1
1952	Colli	Coupé	–
1952	Stabilimenti Farina	Victoria Cabriolet	48
1952	Boneschi	Coupé	–
1953	Ghia	C coupé	–
1953	Ghia	SS coupé	1
1954–1955	Ghia	1900C Coupé Special	10
1955	Ghia-Aigle	Cabriolet (I)	1
1955	Ghia-Aigle	Cabriolet (II)	1
1956	Ghia-Aigle	Coupé	–
1956	Ghia-Aigle	Barchetta "Spider Razza"	1
1957	Ghia-Aigle	SS Cabriolet	–
1957–1959	Ghia-Aigle	Coupé Lugano	–
1958	Ghia-Aigle	SS Cabriolet	–
1958	Ghia-Aigle	SS Coupé	–
1953	Bertone	BAT 5	1
1954	Bertone	BAT 7	1
1955	Bertone	BAT 9	1
–	Bertone	Coupé	–
1955	Worblaufen	SS Cabriolet	–
1953	Vignale	"La Fleche" Spider	1
1953	Vignale	SS Coupé	–

=== 1954 Alfa Romeo 1900 Sport Spider ===
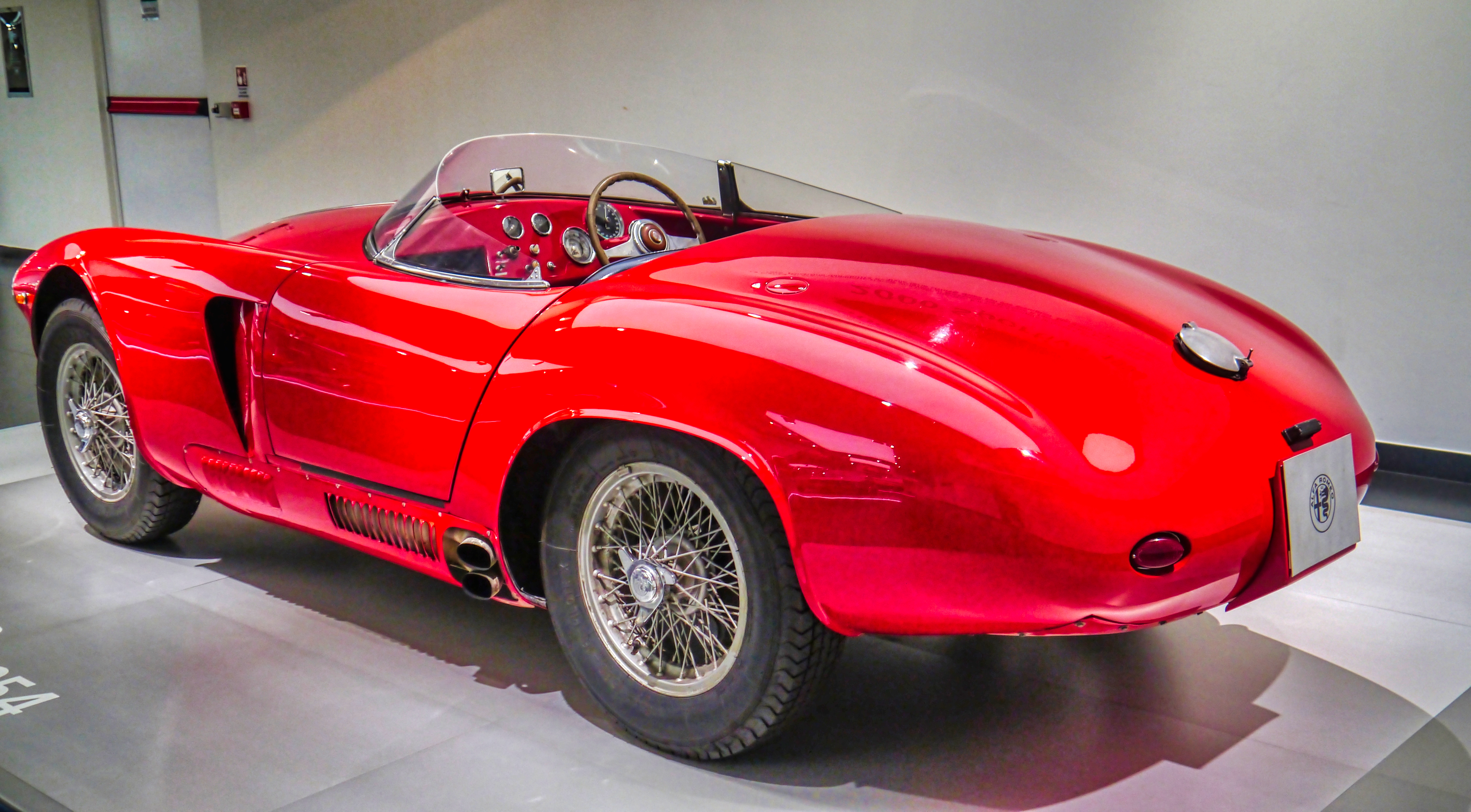
1900 Sport Spider at the Museo Alfa Romeo

In 1954, Alfa Romeo made two spiders and two coupés using similar chassis as the C52 Disco Volante. In Bertone, Franco Scaglione penned two unique aluminium bodies, a coupé and a spider. The coupé was known as 2000 Sportiva. It weighs 2,000 lb (907 kg) and has 138 horsepower (103 kW). The acceleration is on par with most contemporary exotics and top speed is around 137 mph (220 km/h).

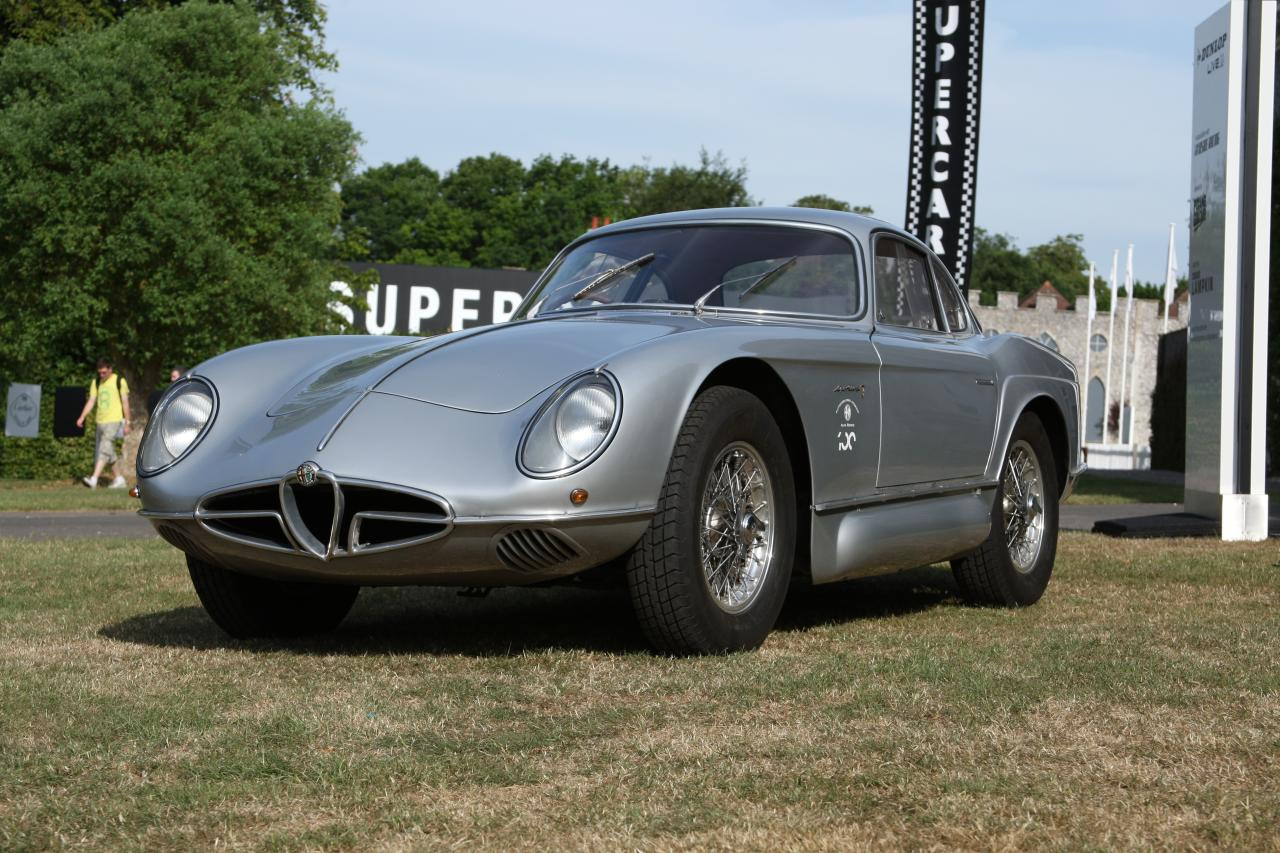
Alfa Romeo 2000 Sportiva Goodwood

== Engines ==
Model	Displacement	Power	Top speed
1900	1,884 cc	80–90 bhp (60–67 kW)	103–106 mph (166–171 km/h)
TI	1,884 cc	100 bhp (75 kW)	170 km/h (106 mph)
Super	1,975 cc	90 bhp (67 kW)	160 km/h (99 mph)
TI Super	1,975 cc	115 bhp (86 kW)	112 mph (180 km/h)

== Production ==
Year	1950	1951	1952	1953	1954	1955	1956	1957	1958	1959	Sum
Berlina	6	1,220	3,107	3,115							7,611
TI	0	0	0	0							572
Sprint 1. serie	0	8	353	289	0	0	0	0	0	0	650
Sprint 2. serie	0	0	0	0	299	0	0	0	0	0	299
Lunga Cabriolet	0	0	91	0	0	0	0	0	0	0	91
Super	0	0	0	0							8,282
TI Super	0	0	0	0							478
Berlina Primavera	0	0	0	0	0	4	286	10	0	0	300
Super Sprint	0	0	0	0	7	248	314	270	15	0	854
M (AR 51)	0	0	5	2,007	0	0	0	0	0	0	2,012
M (AR 52)	0	0	0	0	154	1	0	0	0	0	155
Sum	6	1,228	3,556	5,411	3,909	2,961	2,244	1,804	172	6	21,304

== IKA Bergantín ==
Between March 1960 and February 1962 Industrias Kaiser Argentina produced a car named IKA Bergantín. The body and suspension was from the 1900 Berlina while the drivetrains came from Willys; a 2.5 L (151 cu in) inline-four was fitted to most examples, while the Continental 3.7 L (226.2 cu in) inline-six equipped the Bergantín Super 6. Maximum power is 77 hp (57 kW) and 115 hp (86 kW), respectively. Nearly 5,000 examples were built, of which only 353 were fitted with the six-cylinder engine which was introduced in May 1961. The Bergantín was available in estándar (standard), de Lujo (de Luxe), Super 6, or taxi trim levels.

== Gallery of models ==
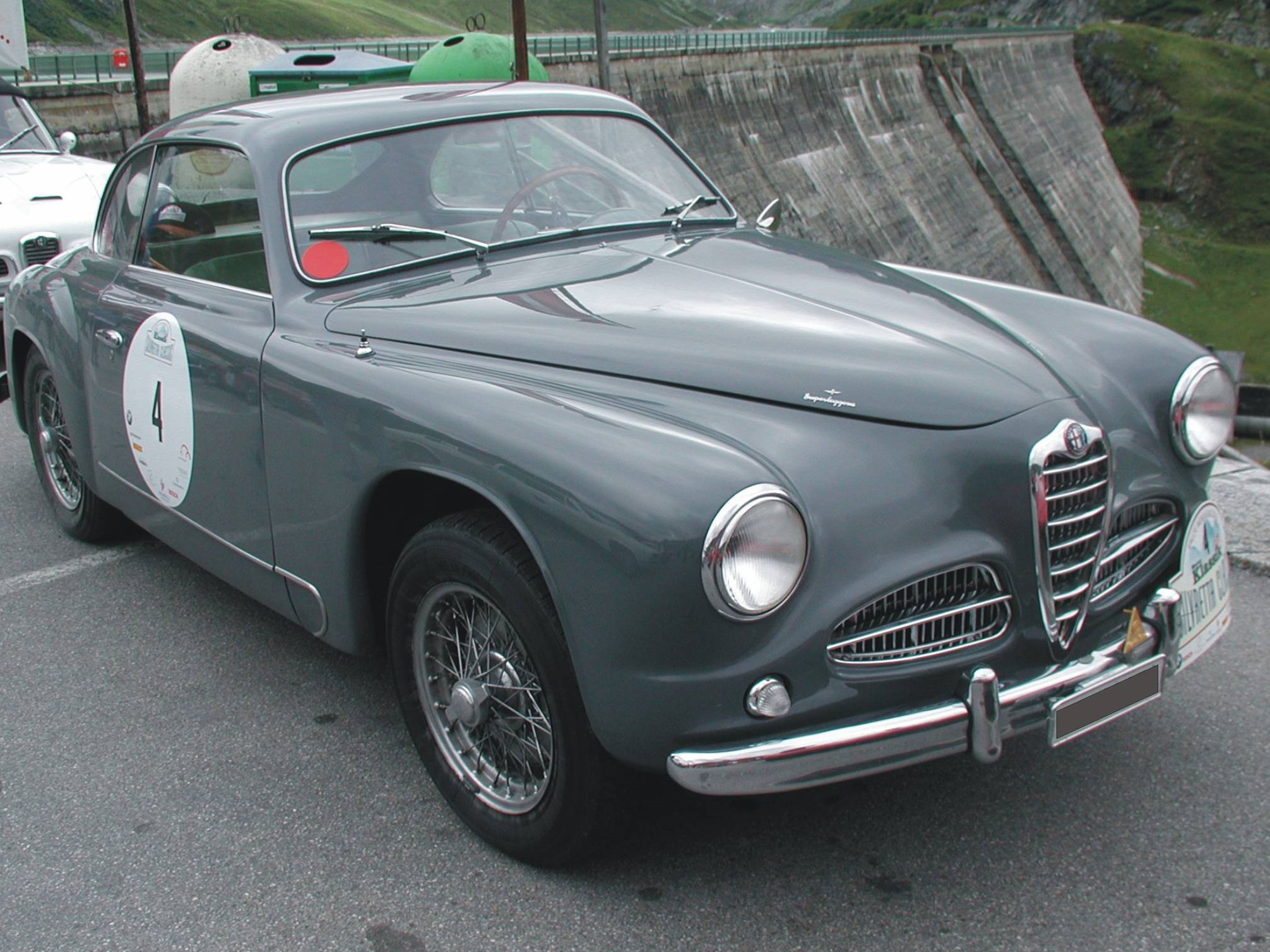
1900 C Sprint Touring (1951; first series)

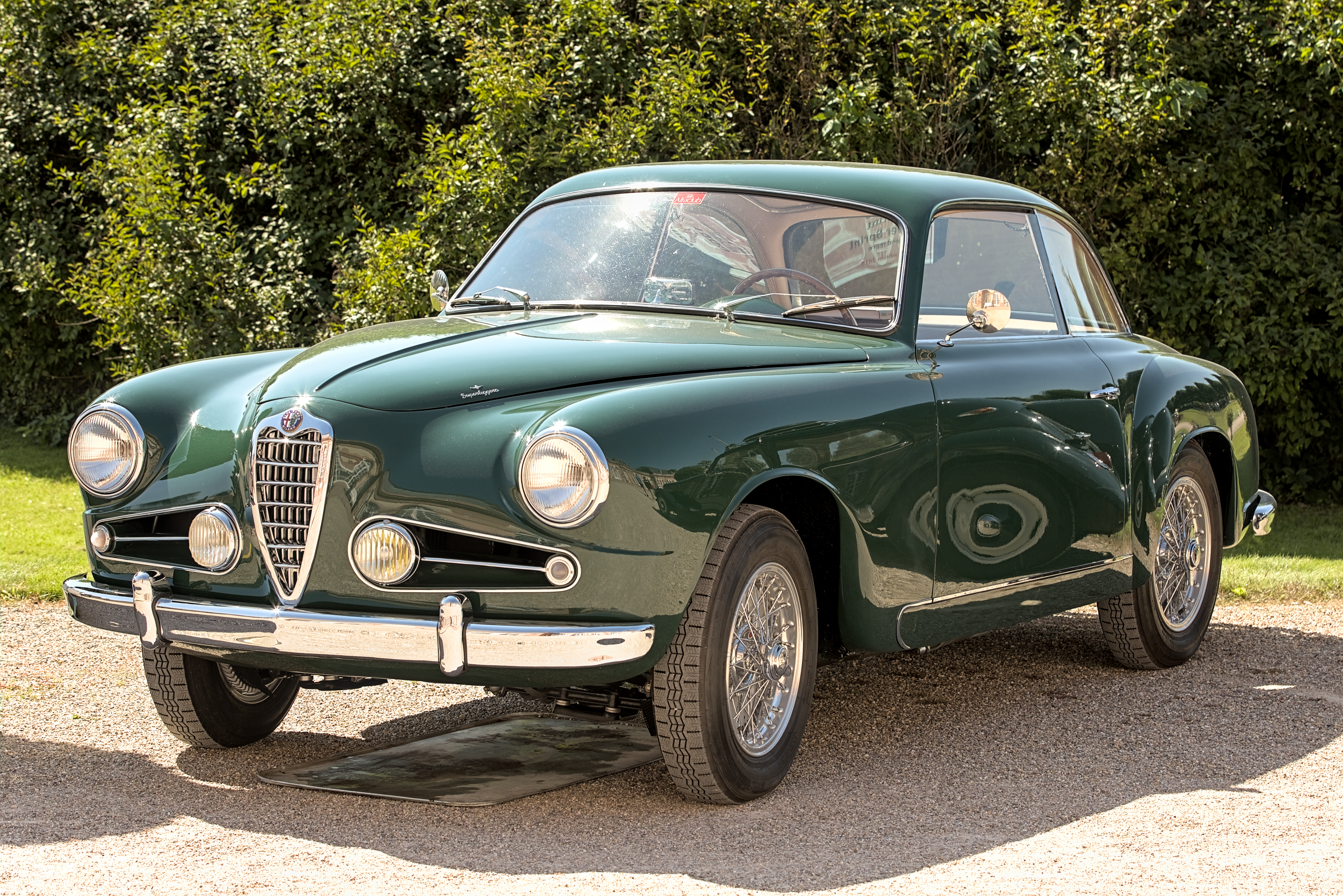
1900 C Super Sprint Touring (1954; second series)

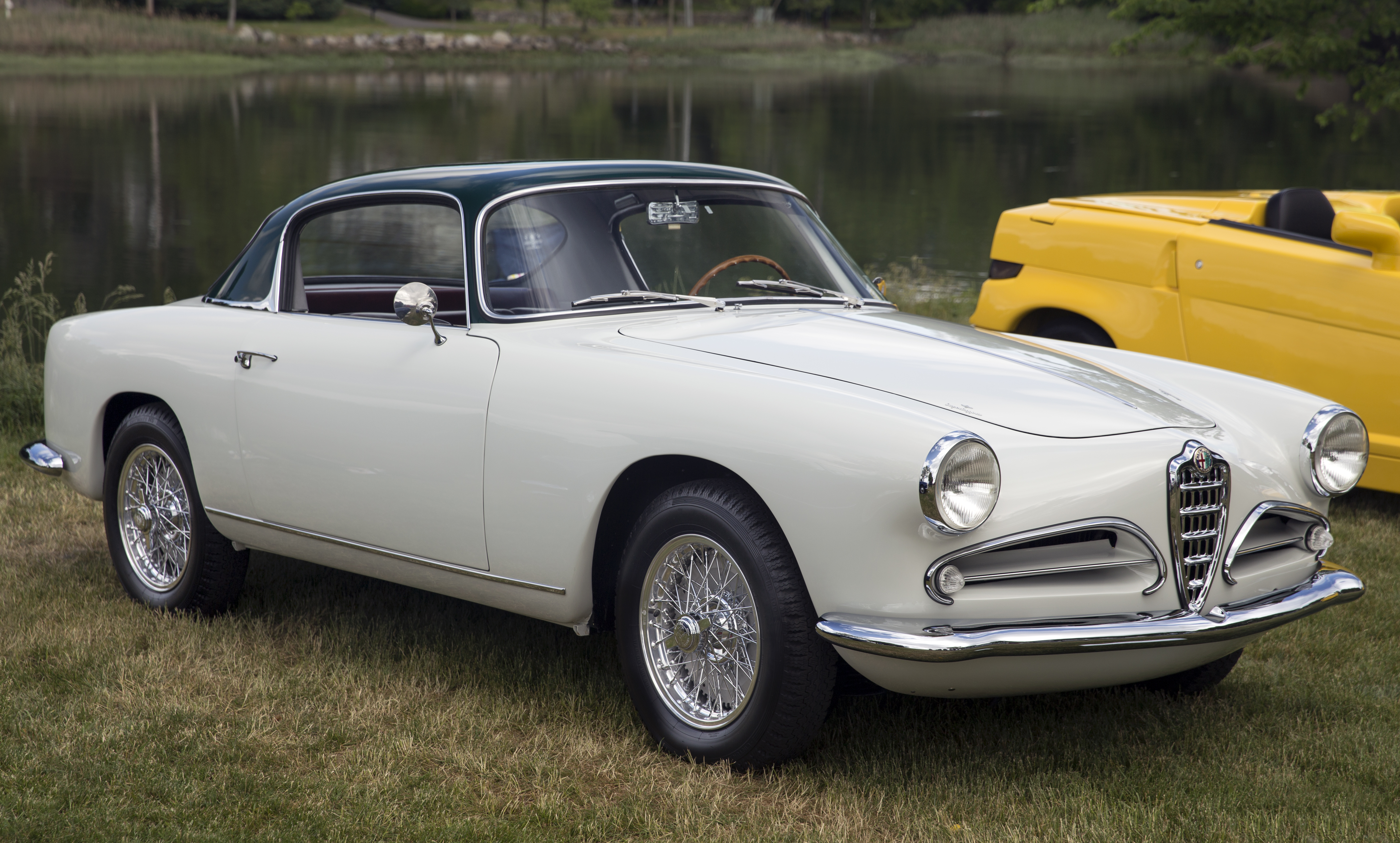
1900C Super Sprint Touring (1956; third series)

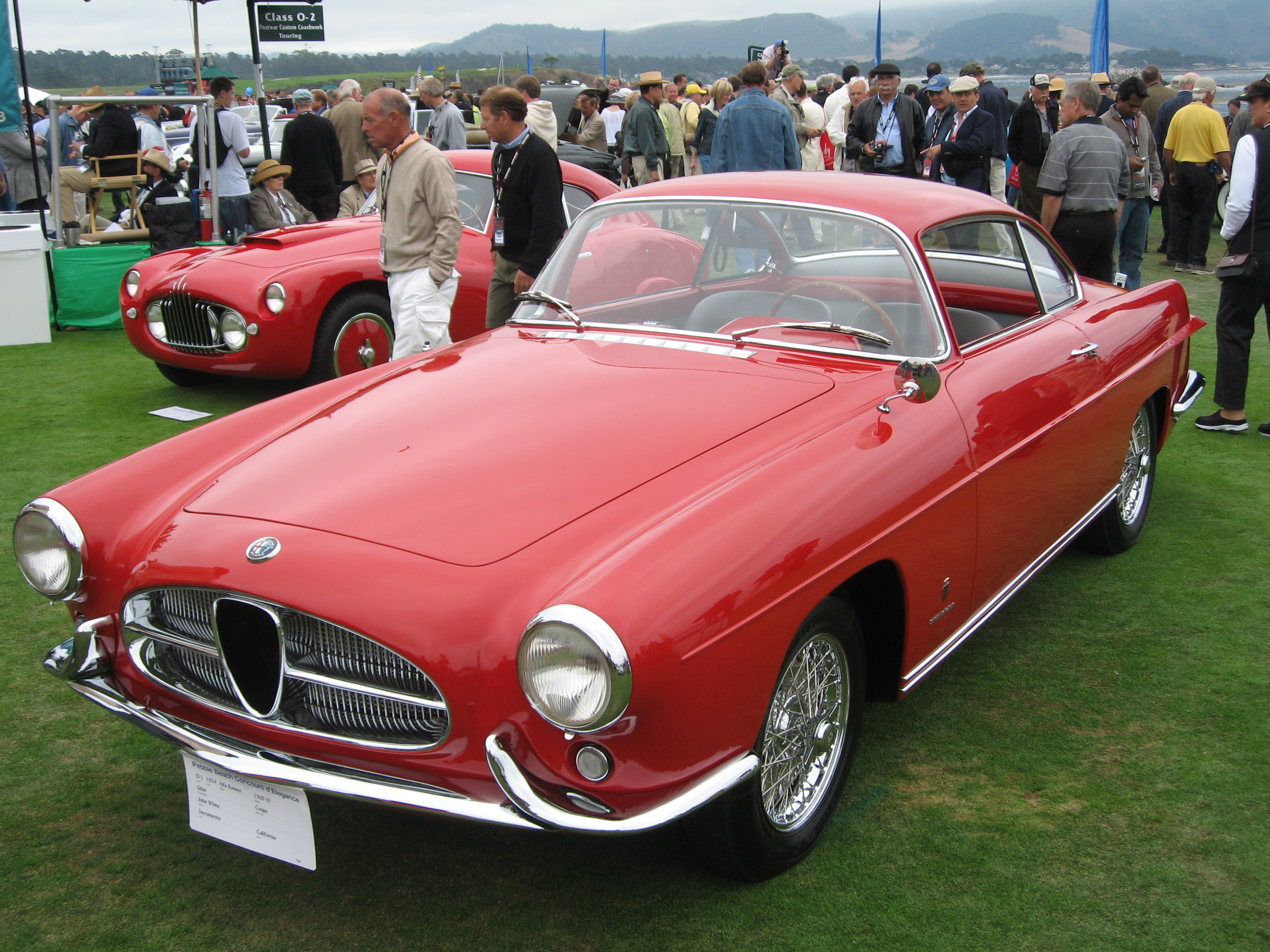
1900 SS Ghia (1954)

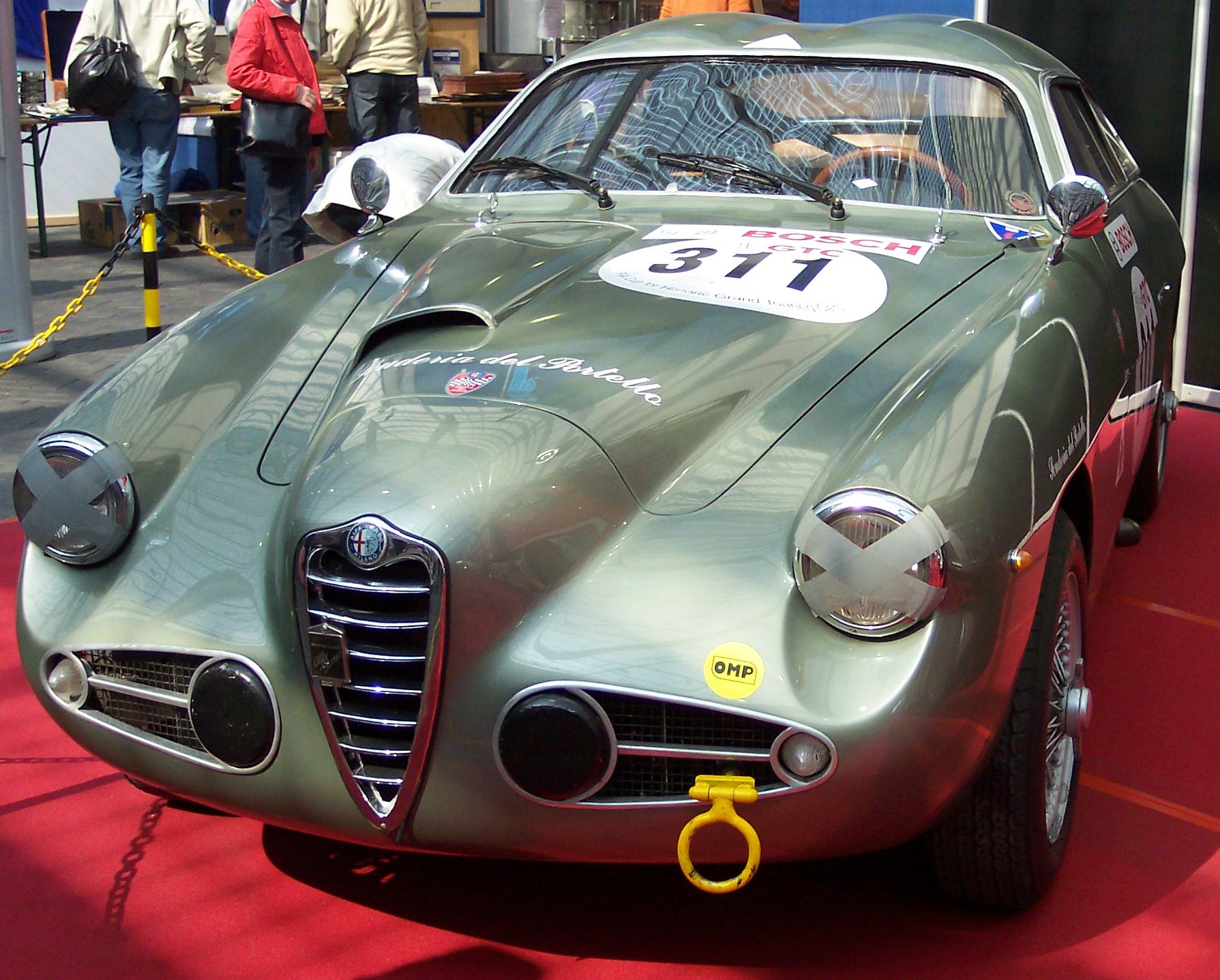
1900 CSS Zagato

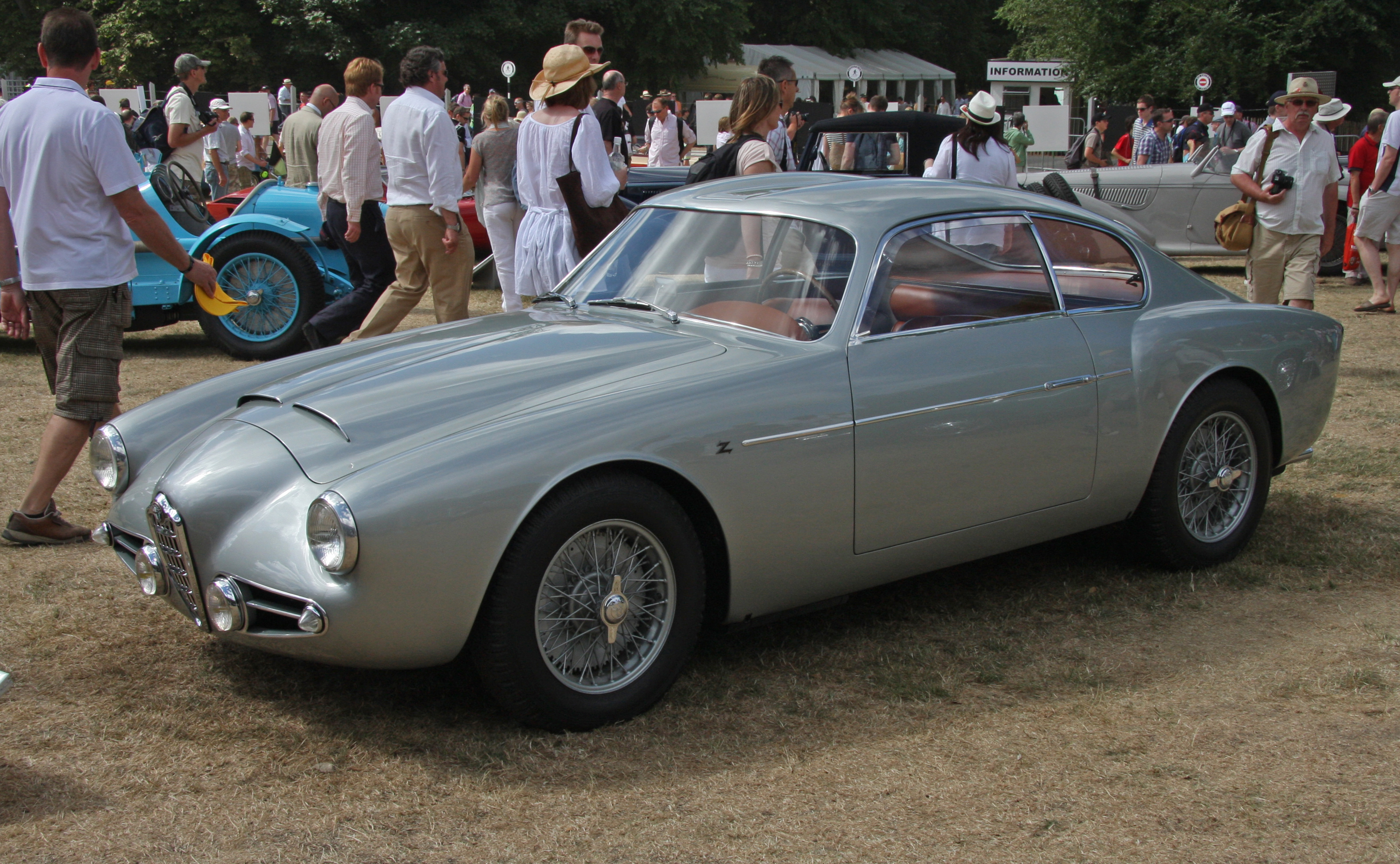
1900 SS Zagato

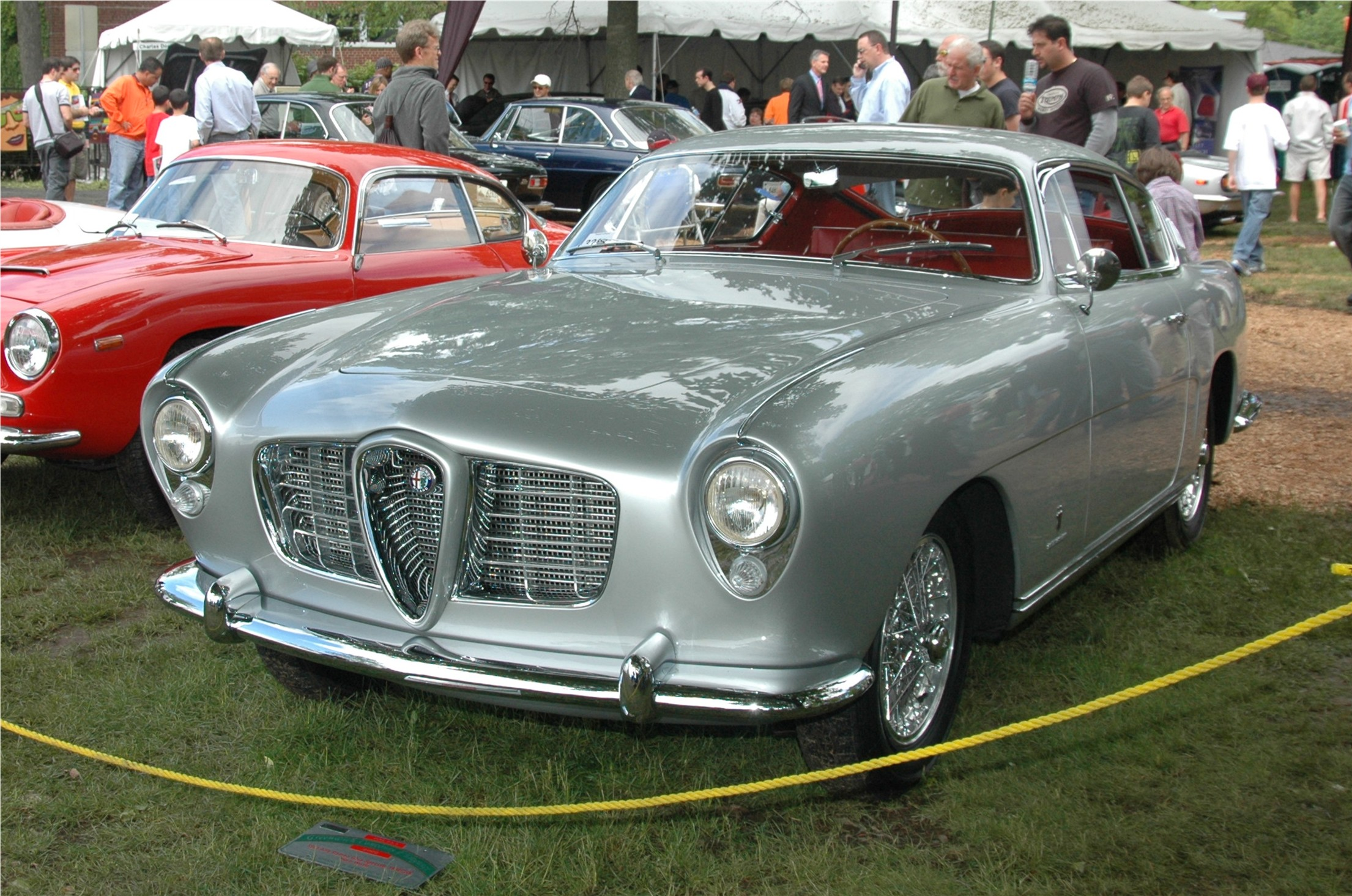
Ghia Speciale 1900 CSS

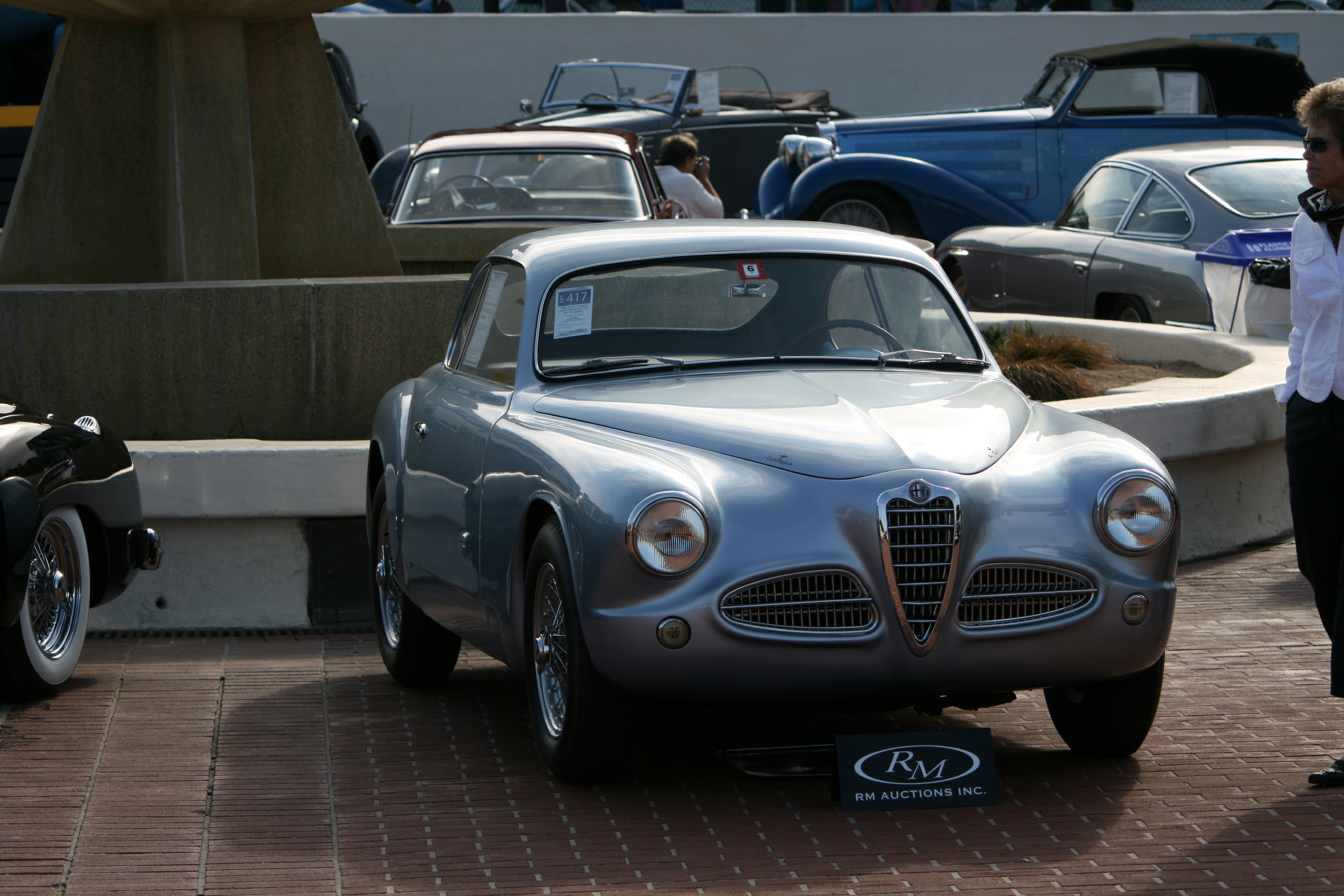
1900C Berlinetta Touring Superleggera (1952)

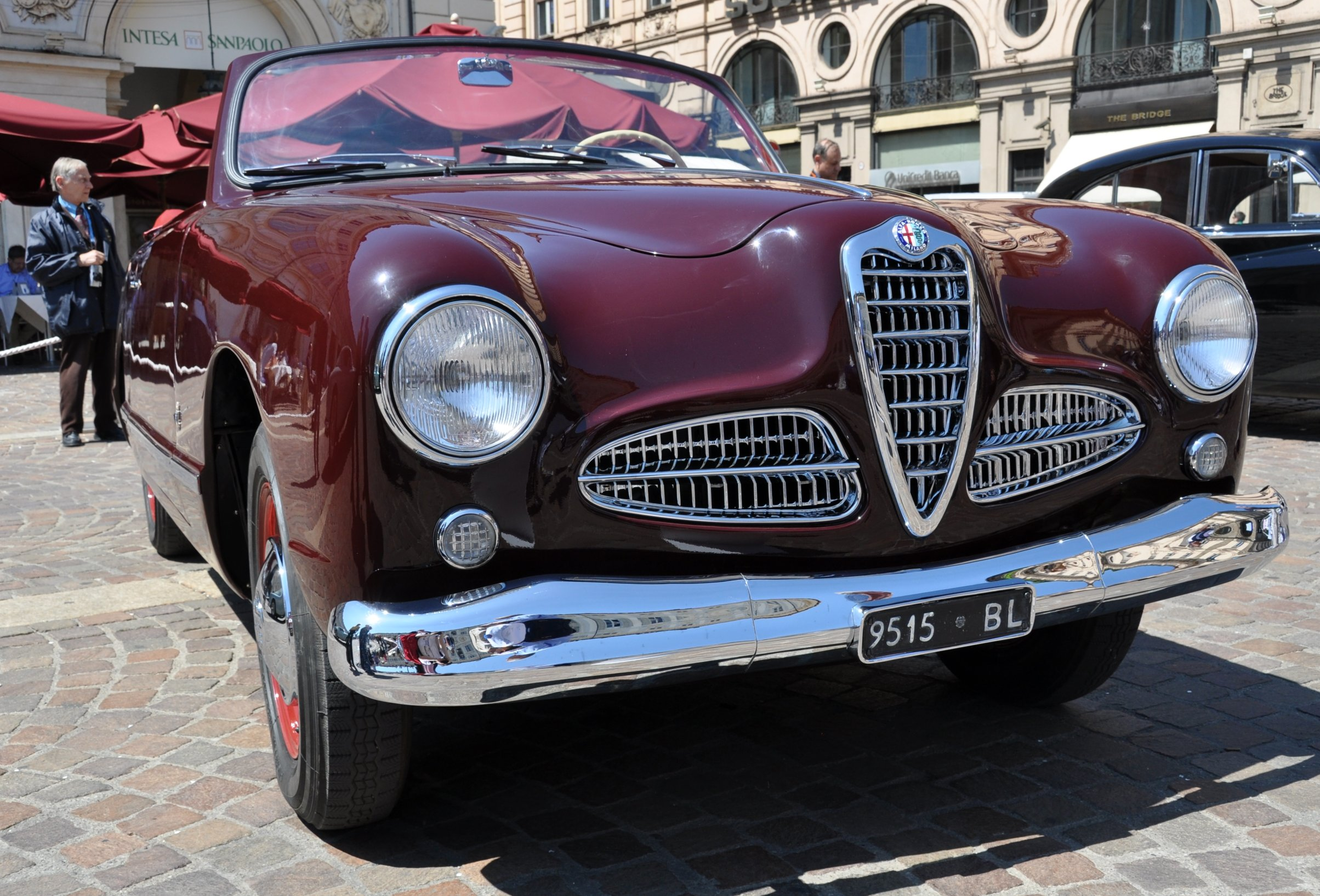
1900 L Victoria Cabriolet 1952 Stabilimenti Farina

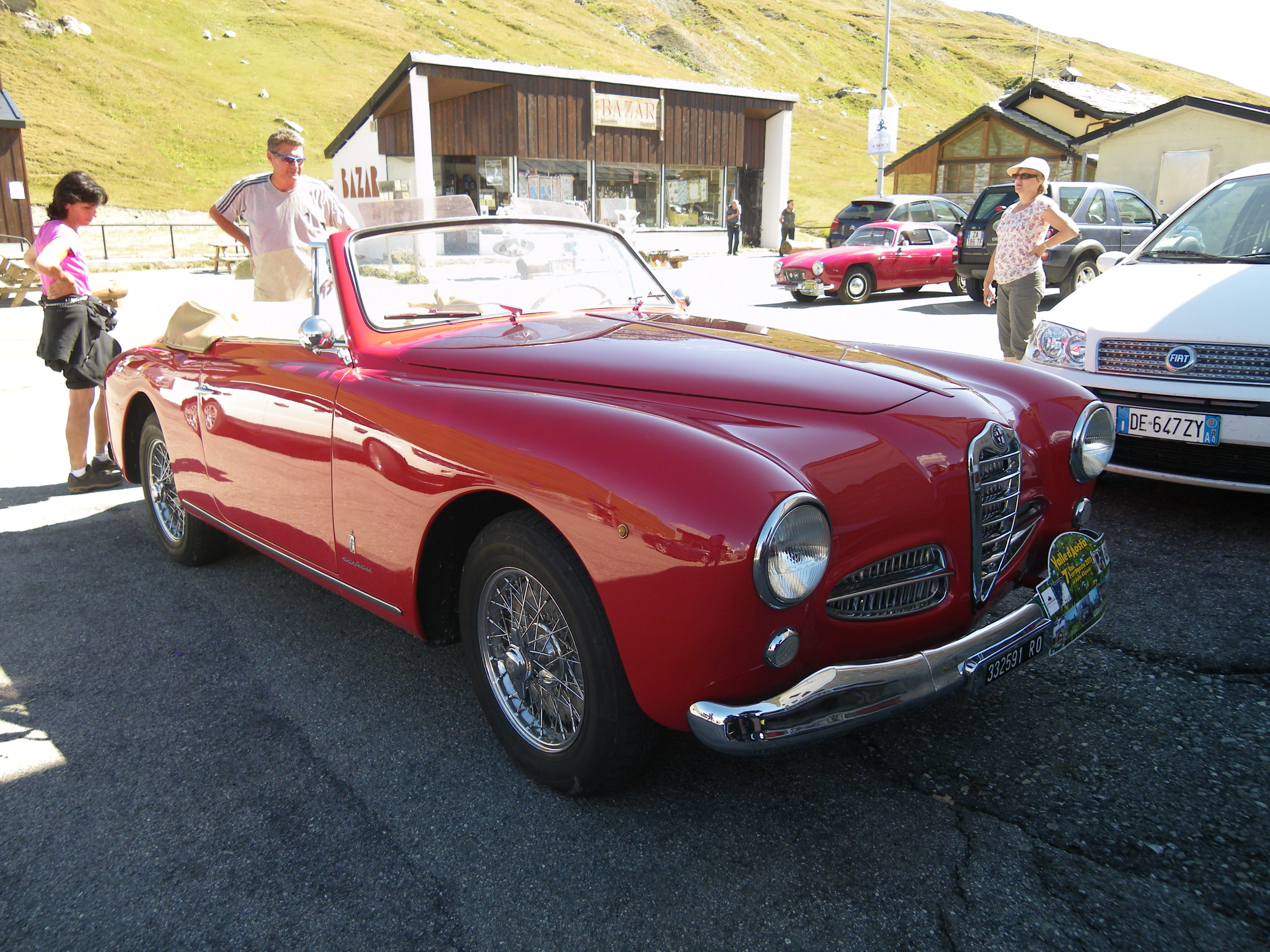
1900 Sprint Cabriolet Pinin Farina (1953)

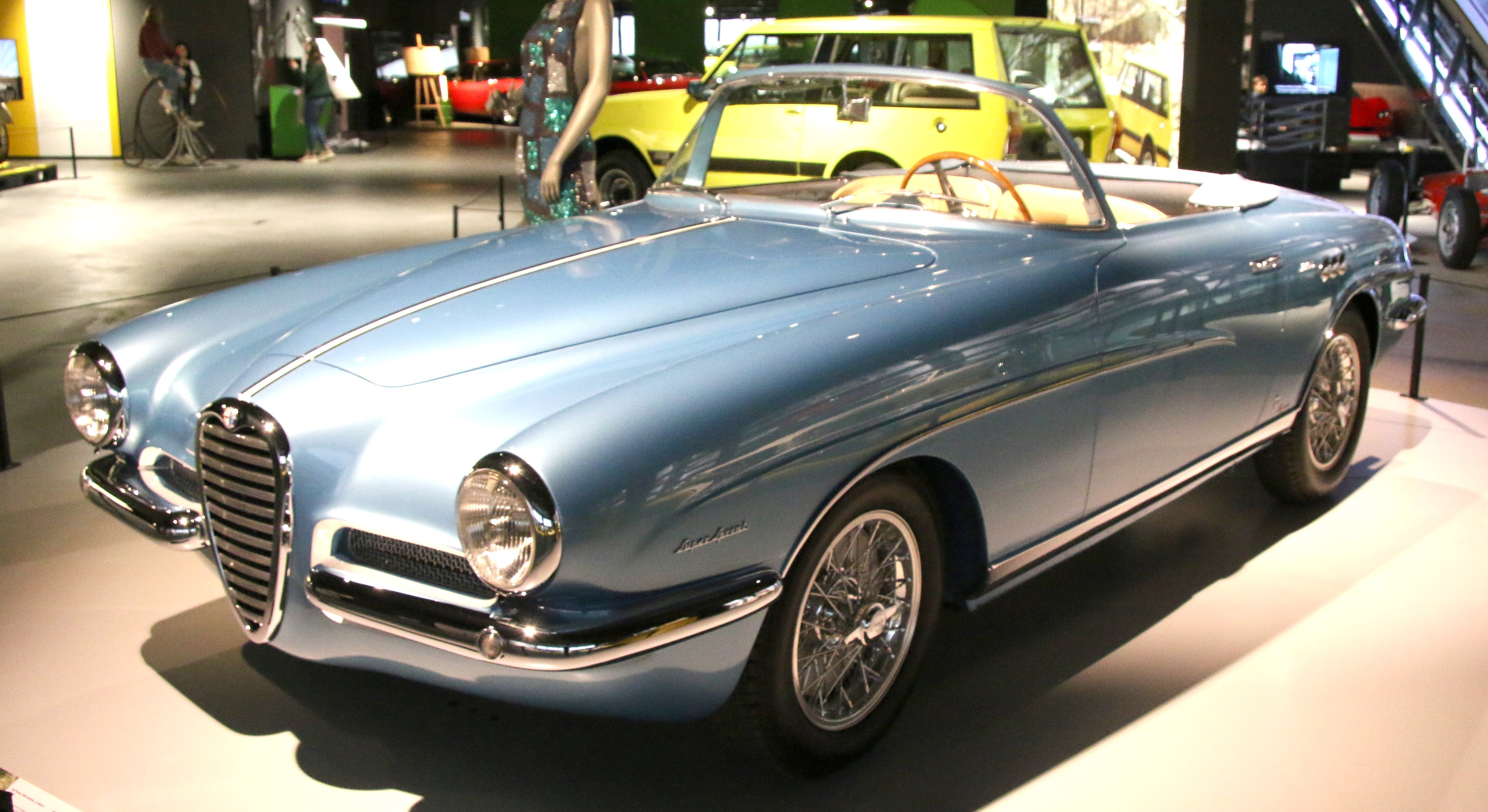
1900C SS Cabriolet La Fleche Vignale

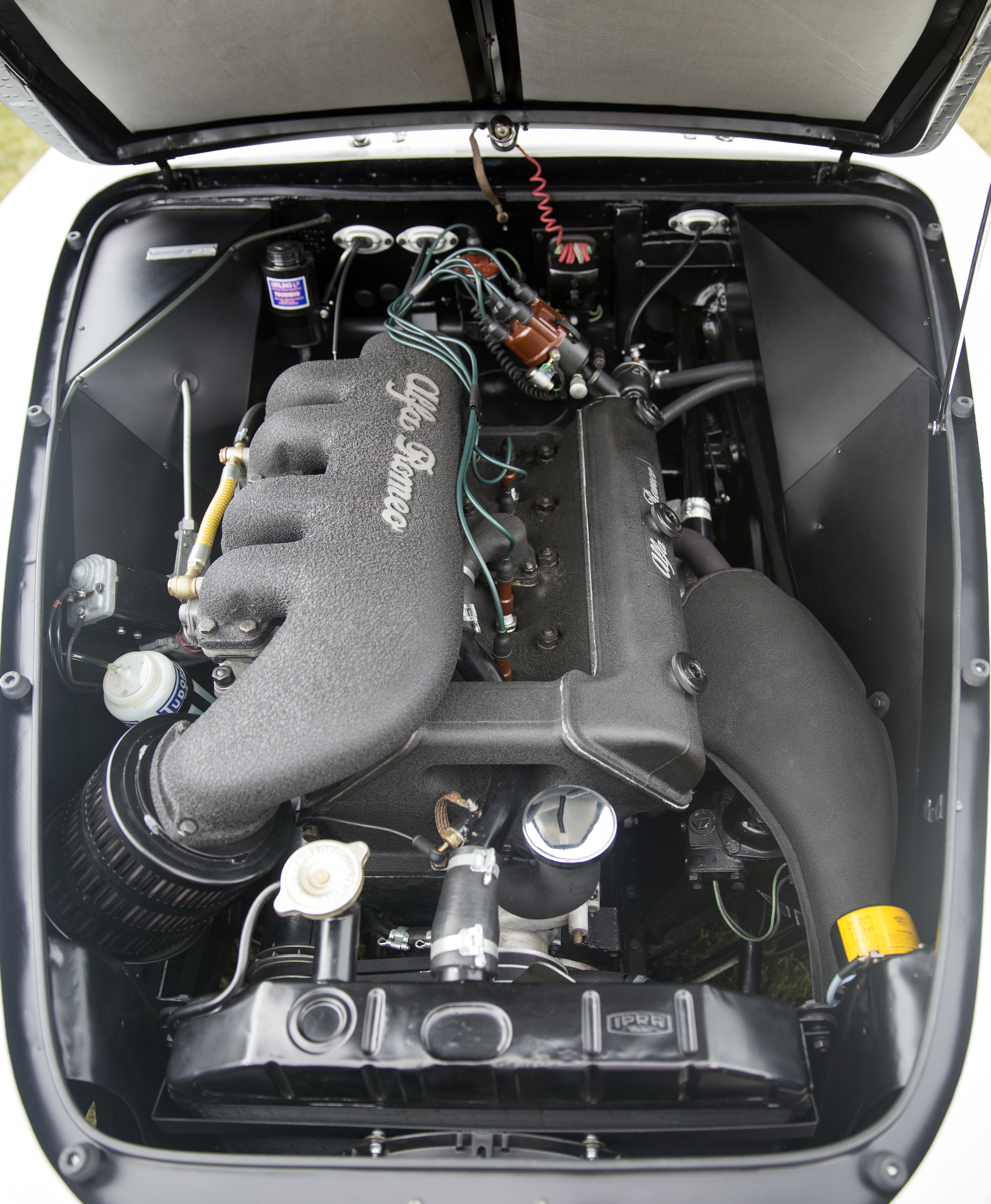
The later, 1975 cc (tipo 1308) engine in a 1900 C SS
