= Ghia-Aigle =

Ghia-Aigle (officially Carrosserie Ghia S.A., Aigle) was a Swiss automobile design and manufacturing company. It was established in 1948 in Aigle, Switzerland, and closed in 1988.

== History ==
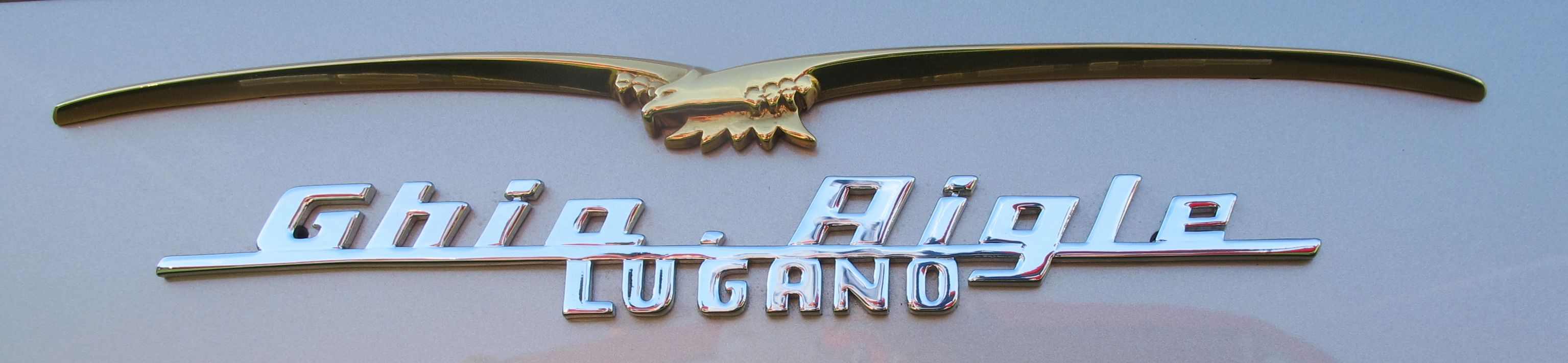
Emblem

Established by P. P. Filippi of Turin, the company originally operated as a subsidiary of Carrozzeria Ghia, becoming independent in 1953 and temporarily located in Lugano (1954–1958). Designers were mainly from Ghia, including Mario Boano (1948–1951), Giovanni Michelotti (1948–1957), and Pietro Frua (1957–1960).

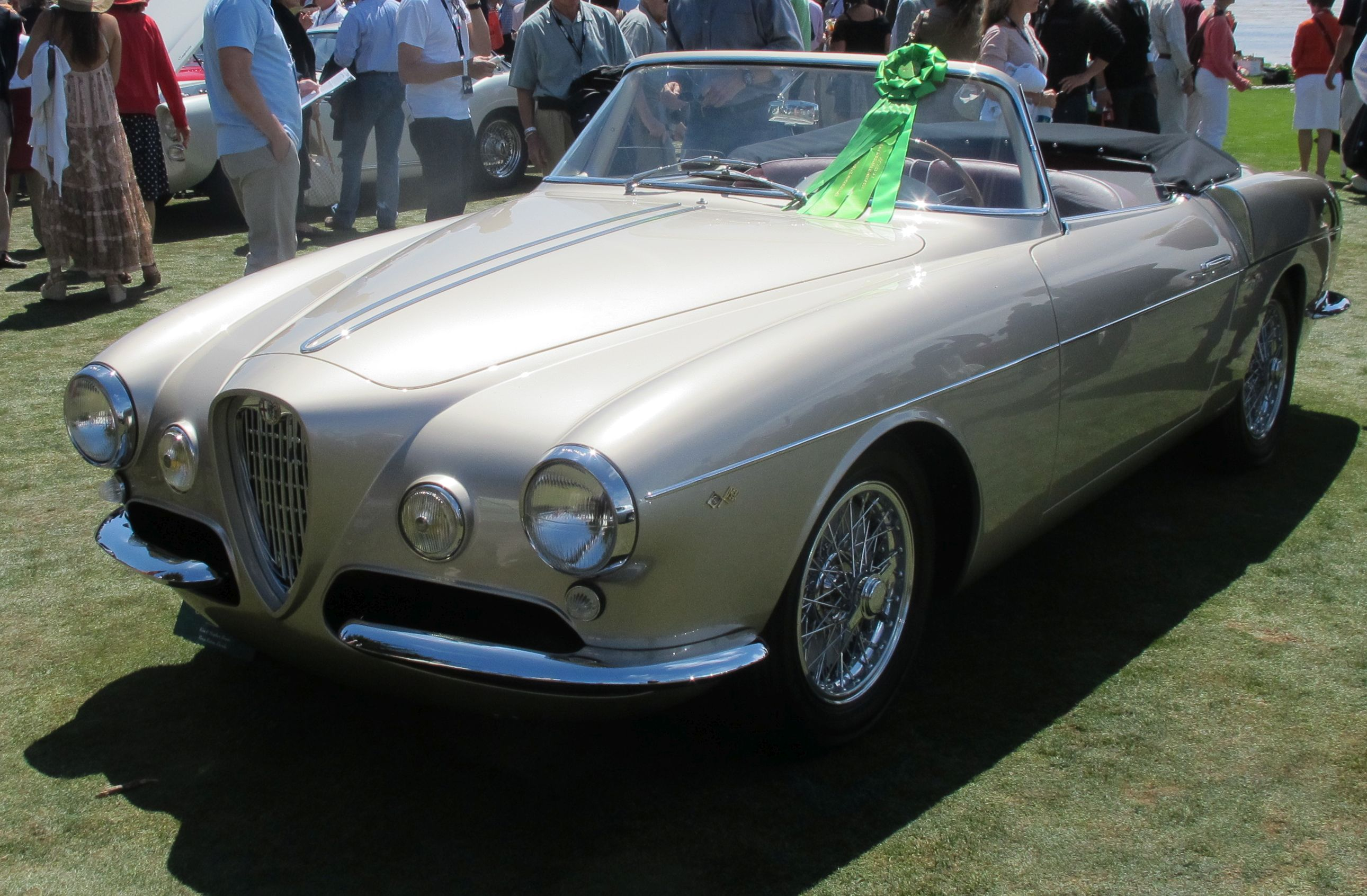
1955 Alfa-Romeo 1900C SS by Ghia-Aigle

Small-scale special designs such as Delahaye 135 (1948), MG T-type#TD (1952), Jowett Jupiter (1951), Panhard Dyna Z coupe (1954), Volkswagen coupe (1957), Lloyd Alexander (1958–1959), Austin-Healey 100 spider, Fiat 500 spider (1957), Lotus Eleven spider and coupe, Chevrolet Corvette coupe, Renault Dauphine spider, MG spider, Porsche 356B coupe, Jaguar XK150 coupe, Alfa Romeo 1900 SS coupe and spider.

The first Alfa-Romeo bodied by Ghia-Aigle was made in 1955 and was shown at the 1955 Geneva Auto Salon. This car was the first of eight Alfas bodied by the firm and it is shown on this page.

Since 1960, the company was mostly involved in minor remodeling of vehicles and closed operations in 1988.
