= List of vehicles with hidden headlamps =

The following is a list of vehicles that feature hidden headlamps (also called pop-up headlights). The vast majority of hidden headlamps are on cars, however, there are a handful of vehicles included in the list that do not fit this category. These include motorcycles, buses and trains. Hidden headlamps have rarely been installed on vehicles since the turn of the millennium, with only low volume production vehicles being manufactured since the discontinuation of the C5 Corvette and Lotus Esprit in 2004.

== List of vehicles with hidden headlamps ==
=== Production vehicles ===
Name	Production start	Production end	Ref.
Abarth 1300 Scorpione	1968	1971	
AC 3000ME	1979	1984	
Ares Design Project1	2018	2018	
Adams Brothers Probe 15	1969	1969	
Adams Brothers Probe 16	1969	1970	
Adams Brothers Probe 2001	1970	1972	
Alfa Romeo Montreal	1970	1977	
Alpine A610	1991	1995	
Alpine GTA	1987	1987	
Aston Martin Lagonda	1976	1989	
Aston Martin Vantage Zagato Volante	1986	1989	
Bertone Runabout	2026	-	
Bitter CD	1973	1978	
Bitter SC	1981	1986	
Bricklin SV-1	1974	1976	
BMW 8 Series (E31)	1989	1999	
BMW M1	1978	1981	
Buick Reatta	1988	1991	
Buick Riviera	1965	1969	
Buick SkyHawk	1986	1989	
Cadillac Eldorado	1967	1968	
Chevrolet Camaro	1967	1969	
Chevrolet Caprice	1968	1969	
Chevrolet Corvette	1963	2004	
Chevrolet Kingswood Estate	1969	1969	
Chrysler 300	1968	1971	
Chrysler Imperial	1969	1993	
Chrysler LeBaron	1987	1992	
Chrysler New Yorker Fifth Avenue	1990	1993	
Chrysler New Yorker	1976	1981	
Cizeta-Moroder V16T	1991	2003	
Clan Clover	1984	1988	
Cord 810/812	1936	1937	
Covini B24	1981	1981	
DARE DZ	1998	1999	
Davis Divan	1947	1949	
DeSoto	1942	1942	
De Tomaso Mangusta	1970	1971	
De Tomaso Pantera	1971	1974	
De Tomaso Guarà	1993	2004	
Dodge Charger	1966	1972	
Dodge Charger Daytona	1969	1970	
Dodge Daytona	1987	1991	
Dodge Magnum	1978	1979	
Dodge Monaco	1972	1973	
Dodge Stealth	1991	1993	
Dodge St. Regis	1979	1981	
Eagle Talon	1990	1991	
Eccentrica V12	2024	-	
Evante Sports 1600 Mk.2	1985	1994	
Ferrari/Dino 208/308 GT4	1974	1980	
Ferrari 288 GTO	1984	1985	
Ferrari 308 GTB	1975	1984	
Ferrari 328	1985	1989	
Ferrari 348	1989	1995	
Ferrari 365 California Spyder	1966	1967	
Ferrari Daytona	1971	1973	
Ferrari Daytona SP3	2022	2023	
Ferrari 400/412	1976	1989	
Ferrari 456/456M	1992	2003	
Ferrari Berlinetta Boxer	1973	1984	
Ferrari F355	1994	1999	
Ferrari F40	1987	1992	
Ferrari Mondial	1980	1995	
Ferrari Testarossa 512TR	1984	1994	
Fiat 125 Samantha	1967	1967	
Fiat/Bertone X1/9	1972	1989	
Ford/Mercury Capri	1989	1994	
Ford Galaxie 500 XL	1968	1970	
Ford LTD (Americas)	1968	1978	
Ford LTD (Australia)	1973	1976	
Ford Landau	1973	1976	
Ford Probe	1989	1997	
Ford Ranchero GT	1970	1971	
Ford Thunderbird	1967	1969	
Ford Torino Brougham	1970	1971	
Geo Storm	1990	1991	
Ginetta G23/24	1981	1981	
Ginetta G26/31	1984	1986	
Ginetta G27	1986	1990	
Ginetta G32	1989	1992	
Ginetta G33	1991	1991	
Hofstetter Turbo	1986	1991	
Honda Accord	1986	1989	
Honda Ballade	1984	1987	
Honda/Acura Integra/Rover 416	1986	1989	
Honda/Acura NSX	1990	2001	
Honda Prelude	1983	1991	
Honda Vigor	1986	1989	
Irish Clan	1982	1982	
Isdera Imperator 108i	1991	1993	
Iso Lele	1969	1974	
Iso Grifo	1965	1974	
Isuzu Piazza	1981	1993	
Italdesign Aztec	1988	1992	
Jaguar XJR-15	1990	1992	
Jaguar XJ220	1992	1994	
Kimera K-39	2026		
Kodiak F1	1983	1989	
Lamborghini Countach	1974	1990	
Lamborghini Diablo	1990	1998	
Lamborghini Islero	1968	1970	
Lamborghini Jalpa	1981	1988	
Lamborghini Jarama	1970	1976	
Lamborghini Urraco	1973	1979	
Lamborghini Miura	1966	1973	
Lamborghini Silhouette	1976	1979	
Lancia Scorpion	1975	1979	
Lancia Stratos	1972	1973	
Ledl AS	1981	1987	
Lincoln Continental	1968	1983	
Lister Storm	1993	1999	
Lombardi Grand Prix	1968	1972	
Lotus Eclat	1975	1982	
Lotus/Kia Elan	1962	1995	
Lotus Elite	1974	1982	
Lotus Esprit	1976	2004	
Lotus Excel	1982	1992	
Malzoni GT	1975	1977	
Manta Mirage	1974	1986	
Maserati Bora	1971	1980	
Maserati Ghibli	1966	1973	
Maserati Indy	1969	1974	
Maserati Khamsin	1974	1982	
Maserati Merak	1972	1982	
Matra 530	1967	1973	
Matra Bagheera	1973	1980	
Matra Murena	1980	1983	
Mazda 626	1987	1987	
Mazda Cosmo/929 HB coupé	1981	1989	
Mazda Familia Astina	1989	1994	
Mazda MX-5/Miata	1989	1997	
Mazda RX-7	1978	2002	
Mercury Capri	1991	1994	
Mercury Cougar	1967	1970	
Mercury Cyclone	1970	1971	
Mercury Marauder	1969	1970	
Mercury Marquis	1969	1978	
Mercury Montego MX	1970	1971	
Mitsubishi GTO/3000GT	1991	1993	
Mitsubishi Eclipse	1990	1991	
Mitsubishi Starion	1982	1990	
Monica 560	1973	1974	
Nissan 180SX/200SX/240SX	1989	1998	
Nissan 300ZX "Z31"	1984	1989	
Nissan EXA	1983	1990	
Oldsmobile Toronado	1966	1969	
Opel GT	1968	1973	
Pangra	1972	1973	
Panther Solo	1989	1990	
Panther 6	1976	1977	
Plymouth Fury	1970	1971	
Plymouth Fury III	1972	1972	
Plymouth Laser	1990	1991	
Plymouth Superbird	1970	1970	
Pontiac Fiero	1984	1988	
Pontiac Firebird (3rd/4th Gen)	1982	2002	
Pontiac Grand Prix	1967	1968	
Pontiac GTO	1968	1969	
Pontiac Sunbird SE/GT	1986	1993	
Pontiac Tojan	1985	1991	
Porsche 911 Turbo SE 'Slantnose'	1985	1989,	
Porsche 914	1969	1976	
Porsche 924	1976	1988	
Porsche 928	1978	1995	
Porsche 944	1982	1991	
Porsche 964 Turbo S 'Flatnose'	1994	1994	
Porsche 968	1991	1994	
Reliant Scimitar SS1/SST/Sabre	1984	1995	
Saab Sonett III	1970	1974	
Saturn SC2	1991	1996	
Subaru XT	1985	1991	
Siata 208 CS	1952	1954	
Siva S160 Spyder	1971	1973	
Spectre R42	1995	1998	
Škoda 1100 GT	1970	1970	
Tatra MTX V8	1991	1991	
Toyota 2000GT	1967	1970	
Toyota Celica	1984	1993	
Toyota MR2	1984	1999	
Toyota Sprinter Trueno/Corolla coupé	1983	1991	
Toyota Supra	1982	1992	
Toyota Tercel	1986	1990	
Triumph TR7/TR8	1975	1982	
TVR 350i, 350SX	1983	1989	
TVR 350SE	1990	1991	
TVR 390SE, 420SE	1984	1989	
TVR 400SE, 400SX, 430SE, 450SE	1988	1991	
TVR 420 SEAC	1986	1988	
TVR 450 SEAC	1988	1989	
TVR Tasmin 280i, Tasmin 200	1980	1988	
Venturi 400 GT	1994	1997	
Venturi Atlantique	1987	1999	
Venturi Coupé series/Transcup	1987	1996	
Volvo 480	1986	1995	
Vector M12	1995	1999	
Vector W8	1989	1993	
Yulon Arex	1993	1995	
Zimmer Quicksilver	1986	1990	

=== Concept cars ===
Name	Production start	Production end	Ref.
Alfa Romeo Caimano	1971	1971	
Alfa Romeo Carabo	1968	1968	
Alfa Romeo Delfino	1983	1983	
Alfa Romeo Iguana	1969	1969	
Alfa Romeo Navajo	1976	1976	
AMC AMX/3	1970	1970	
Aston Martin Bulldog	1980	1980	
Autozam AZ-550 Type A	1989	1989	
Avion	1984	1984	
Bertone Bmw Spicup	1969	1969	
Bertone Ramarro	1984	1984	
BMW 2800 Spicup Bertone	1969	1969	
BMW GINA	2008	2008	
BMW Turbo	1972	1972	
Buick Y-Job	1938	1938	
Cadillac Voyage	1988	1988	
Chevrolet Aerovette	1969	1976	
Chevrolet CERVIII	1990	1990	
Chevrolet Corvair Monza GT	1962	1962	
Chevrolet Corvette Cerv III	1990	1990	
Chevrolet Mako Shark	1962	1962	
Chrysler Turboflite	1961	1961	
Dome Zero	1976	1986	
Ferrari 408 4RM	1987	1988	
Ferrari FZ93 Zagato	1993	1993	
Ferrari Rainbow	1976	1976	
Fiat 850 Dart	1969	1969	
Fitch Phoenix	1966	1966	
Ford Cobra 230 M.E.	1986	1986	
Ford GT70 Concept	1971	1971	
Ford Probe I	1979	1979	
Ford Maya	1984	1984	
Ford XP Bordinat Cobra	1965	1965	
FSO Ogar LS	1977	1977	
General Motors Le Sabre	1951	1951	
General Motors XP-819	1965	1965	
Ginetta G25	1983	1983	
Gorgona NM	2022	2022	
Holden Hurricane	1969	1969	
Holden Torana GTR-X	1990	1990	
Honda 0 Saloon	2025	2025	
Iso Grifo 90	1991	1991	
Iso Varedo	1972	1972	
Isuzu Bellett Mx1600 by Ghia	1969	1969	
Jaguar XJ Spider	1978	1978	
Volkswagen Karmann Cheetah	1971	1971	
Lamborghini Athon	1980	1980	
Lamborghini Bravo	1974	1974	
Lamborghini Frua Faena	1978	1978	
Lamborghini Marco Polo	1982	1982	
Lamborghini P140	1987	1987	
Lancia Medusa	1980	1980	
Lancia Mizar	1974	1974	
Lancia Sibilo	1978	1978	
Lincoln Quicksilver	1983	1983	
Lotus Etna	1984	1984	
Lotus M90	1984	1984	
Mako Shark II	1965	1965	
Maserati Boomerang	1972	1972	
Maserati Simun	1968	1968	
Matra Laser	1971	1971	
MVS Ventury	1984	1986	
Mazda Iconic SP	2023	2023	
Mazda P729	1986	1986	
Mazda V705	1985	1985	
Mazda MX-81 Aria	1981	1981	
Mercedes-Benz C111	1969	1970	
MG Boxer	1978	1978	
MG Cyber X	2025	2025	
MG EX-E	1985	1985	
Monteverdi Hai 450	1970	1973	
Nissan 126X	1970	1970	
Nissan300 Bambu	1992	1992	
Nissan MID4	1985	1987	
NSU Trapeze	1973	1973	
Opel CD	1969	1969	
Opel Experimental GT	1965	1965	
Škoda 110 Super Sport	1971	1971	
Satecmo Eolia	1954	1954	
Serenissima GT by Ghia	1968	1968	
Tesla Roadster	2026	2026	
Toyota FXV	1985	1985	
Toyota SA-X	1981	1981	
Toyota SV-2	1981	1981	
Toyota SV-3	1983	1983	
Tracer TXC	1985	1985	
Vauxhall XVR	1966	1966	
Vector WX-3	1993	1993	
Volvo Tundra	1979	1979	
Yuna 2500	1982	1982	
Zender Vision 1S	1983	1983	
Zender Vision 2	1985	1985	
Zender Vision 3	1987	1987	
Zender Vision 3C	1986	1986	

=== Other vehicles ===
Name	Type	Production start	Production end	Ref.
Alfa Romeo 8C 2900A Pininfarina Berlinetta	Coachbuilt car	1936	1936	
Talbot-Lago T150C SS Figoni et Falaschi	Coachbuilt car	1937	1938	
Maserati A6 1500 Pininfarina Berlinetta Speciale	Coachbuilt car	1947	1947	
Ferrari 375 MM Pininfarina Bergman Coupé Speciale	Coachbuilt car	1954	1954	
Ferrari 400 Superamerica Pininfarina Superfast II	Coachbuilt car	1960	1960	
Porsche 911 Roadster (901) Bertone	Coachbuilt car	1966	1966	
Keisei AE100 series	Train	1990	2016	
Honda Elite/Spacy 125/150	Scooter	1984	1987	
Pegaso-Obradors	Bus			
Rover-BRM	Race car	1963	1965	
Suzuki GSX750S Katana	Motorcycle	1984	1985	

== Notes ==
1. Redesign of the Lamborghini Huracán, also known as the Ares Panther.
2. Installed on U.S. spec models due to DOT headlight height requirements.
3. Not on models between 1971 and 1974.
4. Also sold as the Isuzu Piazza and Asüna Sunfire. Does not include model years 1988-1990.
5. Dealer optional with Mazda Cosmo HB front-end for the Indonesian market.
6. Includes Trans Am and Formula models.
7. Includes Toyota Tercel, Corolla II, and Corsa.
8. Custom coachbuilt example of the original Alfa Romeo 8C. Notable as potentially the first vehicle with hidden headlamps.
