= Hidden headlamp =

Headlamps that are hidden while not in use

Two images showing a Mazda 323F's headlights retracted and visible.

Hidden headlamps, also commonly known as pop-up headlamps, pop-up headlights, flip-eye headlamps, or hideaway headlights, are a form of automotive lighting and an automotive styling feature that conceals an automobile's headlamps when they are not in use.

Depending on the design, the headlamps may be mounted in a housing that rotates so as to sit flush with the front end as on the Lamborghini Miura or Porsche 928, may retract into the hood and/or fenders as on the 1963–2004 Chevrolet Corvette, or may be concealed behind retractable or rotating grille panels as on the 1966-1970 Dodge Charger, 1970-1971 Mercury Cyclone, or the 1965 Buick Riviera.

== History ==
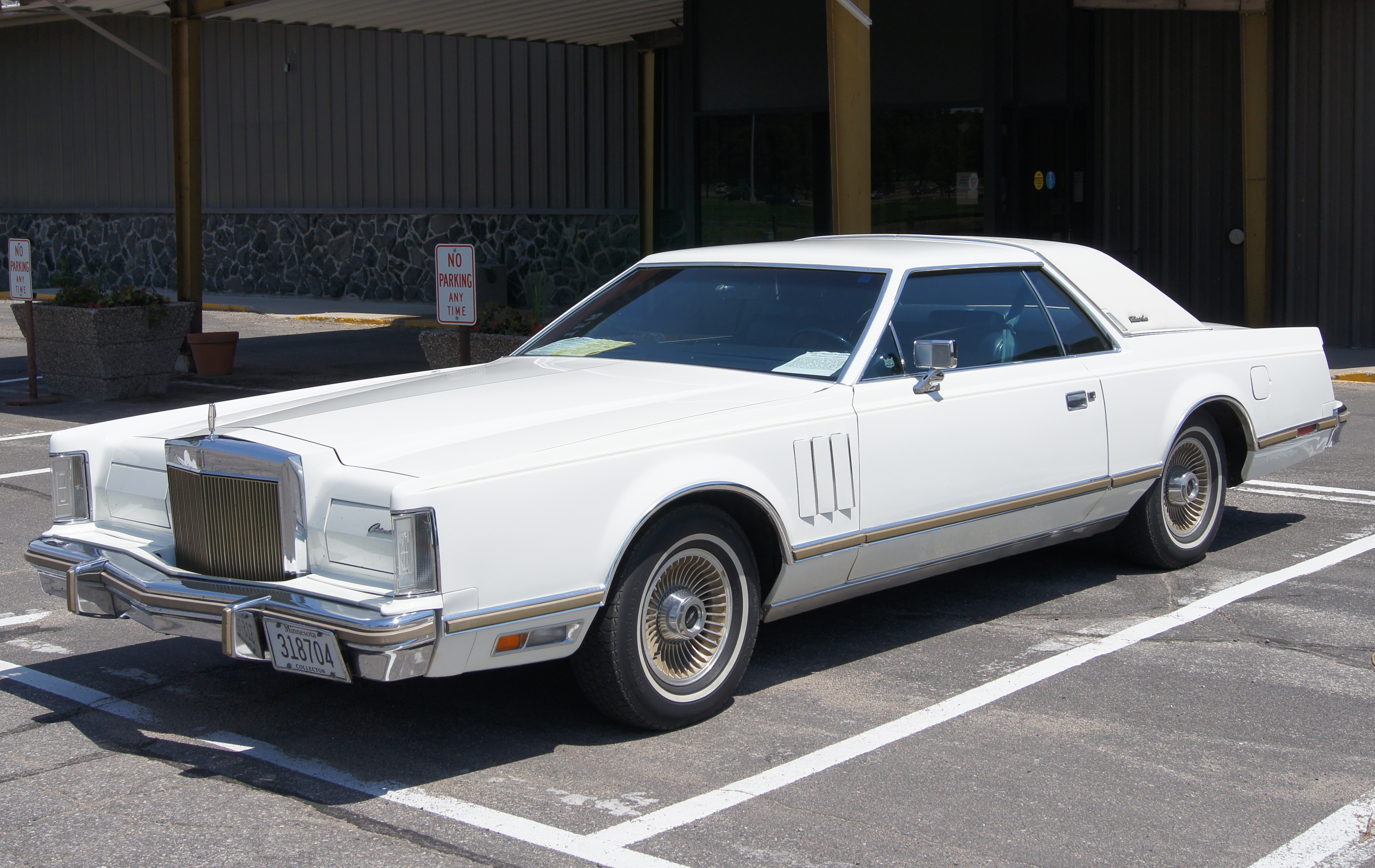
1979 Lincoln Continental Mark V Collector’s Edition, with its large headlight covers in their lowered position.

Hidden headlamps first appeared on the Cord 810 in November 1935 at the New York Auto Show and shortly after on a custom example of the Alfa Romeo 8C in 1936. In the Cord, a pair of cranks on either side of the dashboard could be turned by hand to bring out the headlamps when needed. Powered hidden headlamps first appeared on GM's concept car in 1938, the Buick Y-Job, and appeared on concept cars for several years after, including the 1951 General Motors Le Sabre. However, power hidden headlamps would not appear on a production vehicle until 1962 with the Lotus Elan. The popularity of this feature has waxed and waned over time. Hidden headlamps regained popularity in the mid-to-late 1960s, first in Europe but particularly in the US where aerodynamic headlamps were not permitted. A relatively large variety of cars incorporated hidden headlamps in the 1970s, 1980s, 1990s, and up to the early 2000s. Subsequent legislation led to hidden headlamps falling increasingly out of favor.

In the past, manufacturers often used hidden headlamps to circumvent headlight height regulations in the United States. For instance, in 1983, Toyota exported their retractable headlight version of the AE86 (known domestically as the Sprinter Trueno) instead of the Corolla Levin, as the former had a higher headlamp height, enough to satisfy US regulations. This prevented them from needing to raise the body height of the car, which would have affected handling.

=== Discontinuation ===
US laws now permit aerodynamic headlamps, relative to which hidden headlamps represent added cost, weight, and complexity as well as reliability concerns as cars age. Internationalized ECE auto safety regulations have also recently incorporated pedestrian-protection provisions restricting protuberances from car bodies, making it more difficult and expensive to design compliant pop-up headlamps.

The last time pop-up headlamps appeared on a volume-production car was in 2004, when both the Lotus Esprit and Chevrolet Corvette (C5) ended production. Development of both projector beam headlamps such as those on the 1990 Nissan 300ZX (Z32), and more efficient, bright LED headlamps has, in practice, eliminated the need for hidden headlamps altogether.

After 2004, hidden headlamps made an almost complete disappearance from production cars. Despite this, however, hidden headlamps are not outright banned, and as such, they can be still be installed on street-legal vehicles today such as the Ares Design Project1. One of the few modern production cars to use hidden headlamps is the Ferrari Daytona SP3, which features retractable eyelids that cover part of the headlight. Additionally, some modern concept cars, such as the Mazda Iconic SP, have also been shown with hidden headlamps.

== Other vehicles with hidden headlamps ==
Although most hidden headlamps are installed on cars, they have also been installed on other types of vehicles. These include motorcycles such as the Honda Elite 150, some coaches such as Pegaso-Obradors and trains such as the Keisei AE100.

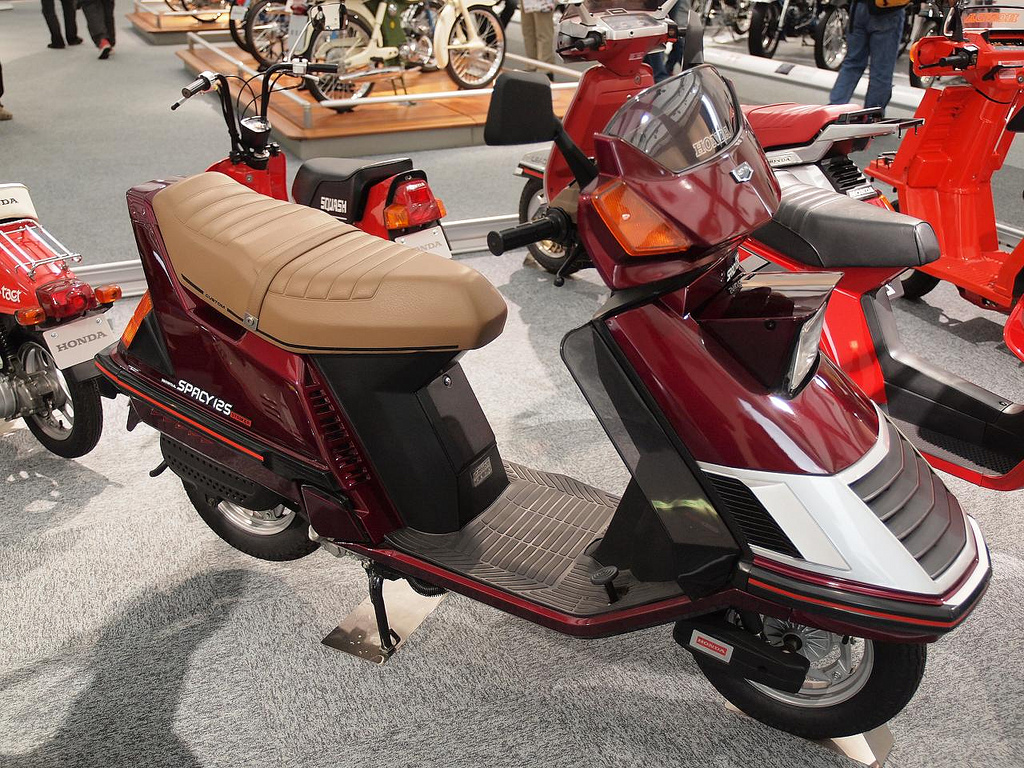
Honda Spacy 125 Striker

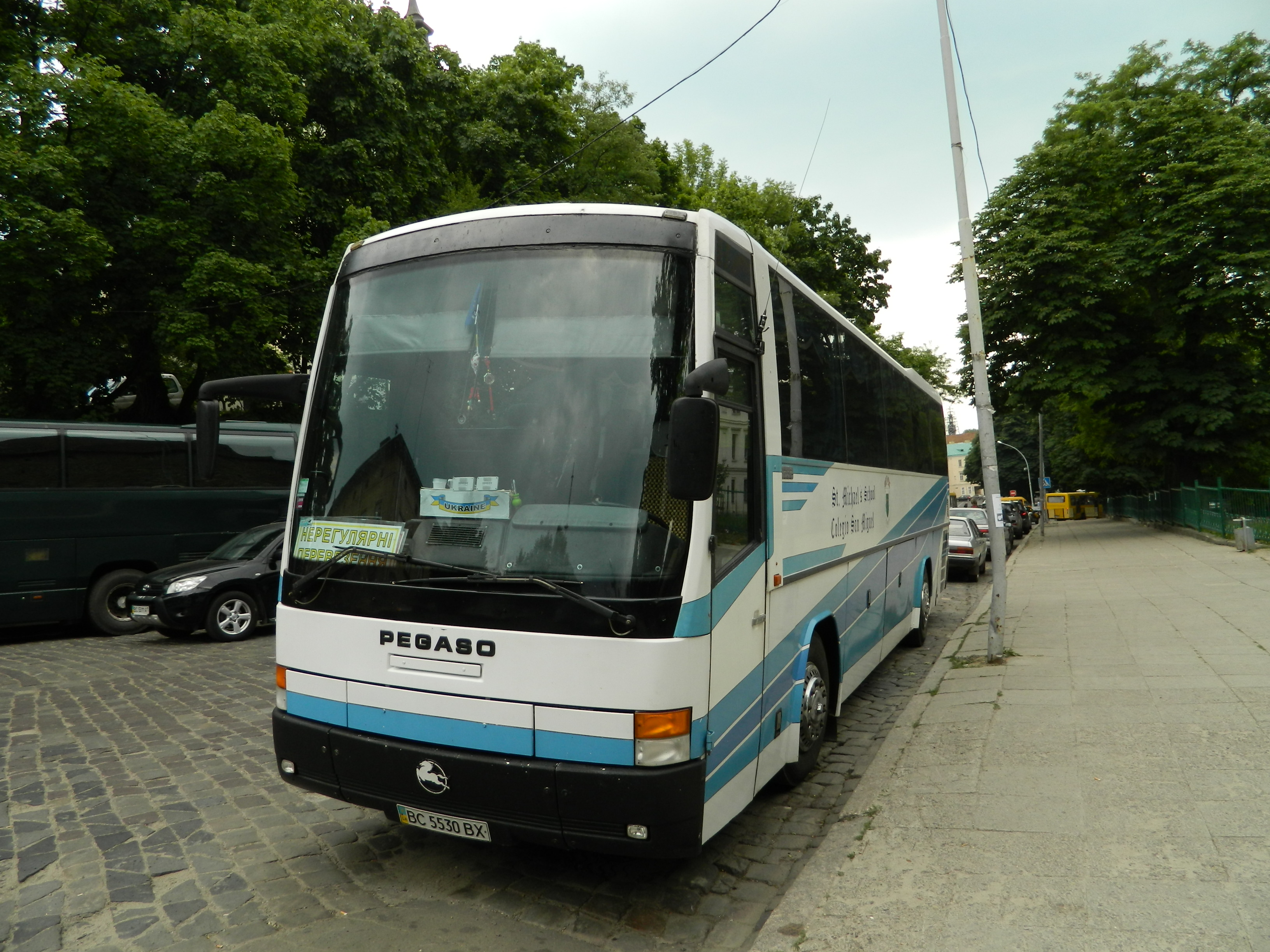
Pegaso-Obradors ST-350

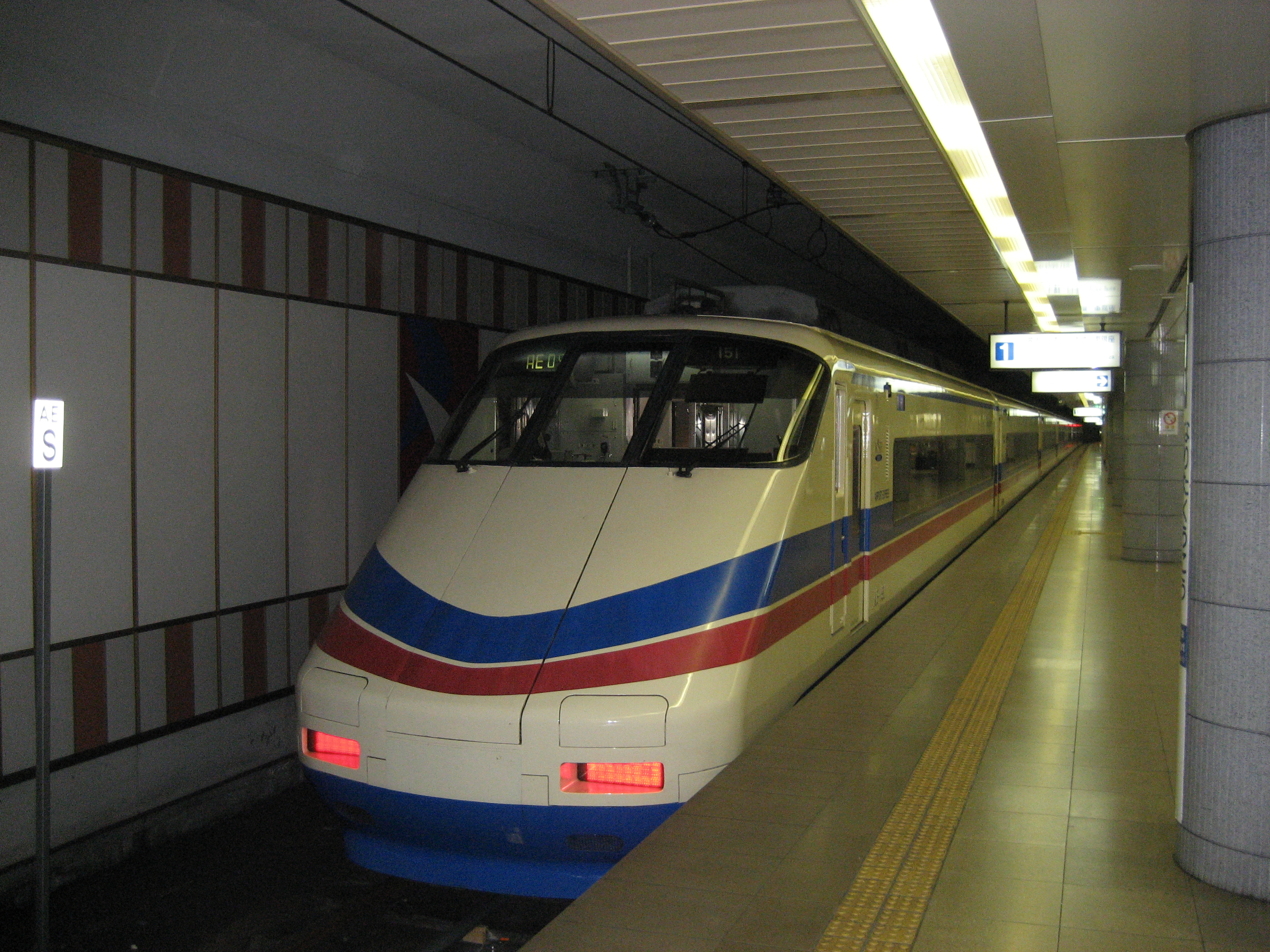
Keisei AE100 Skyliner

== Gallery ==
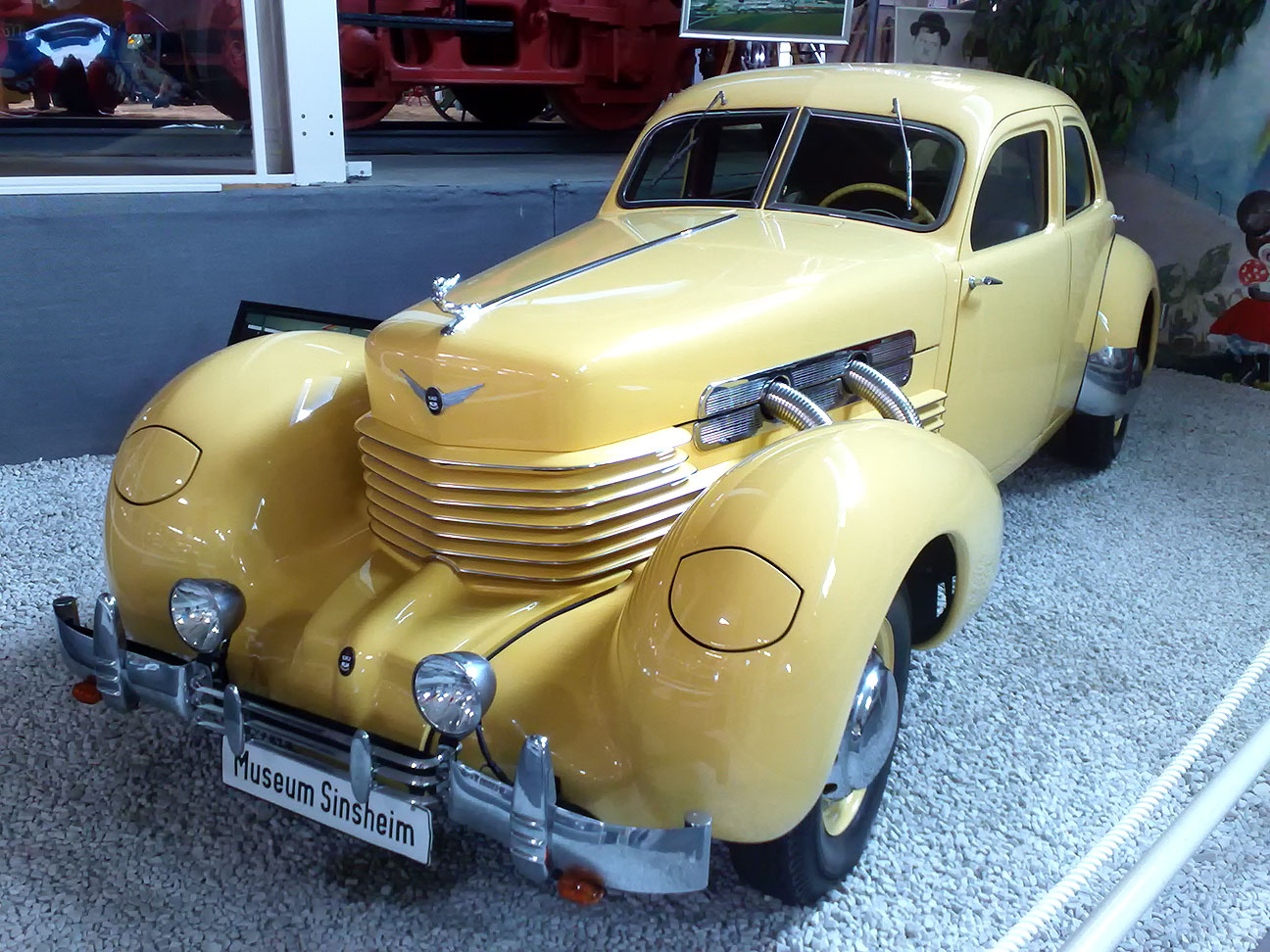
1937 Cord 812

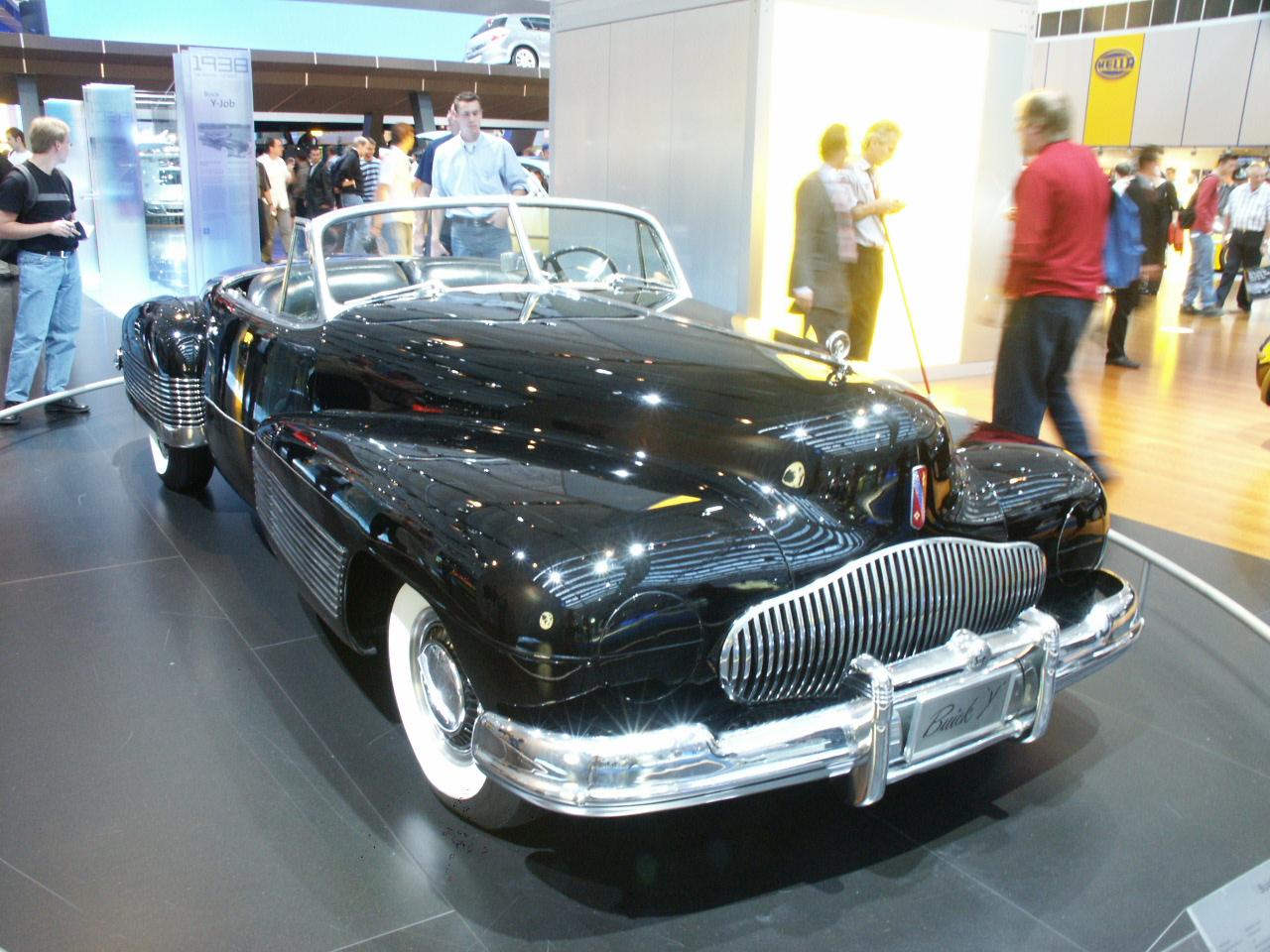
1938 Buick Y-Job

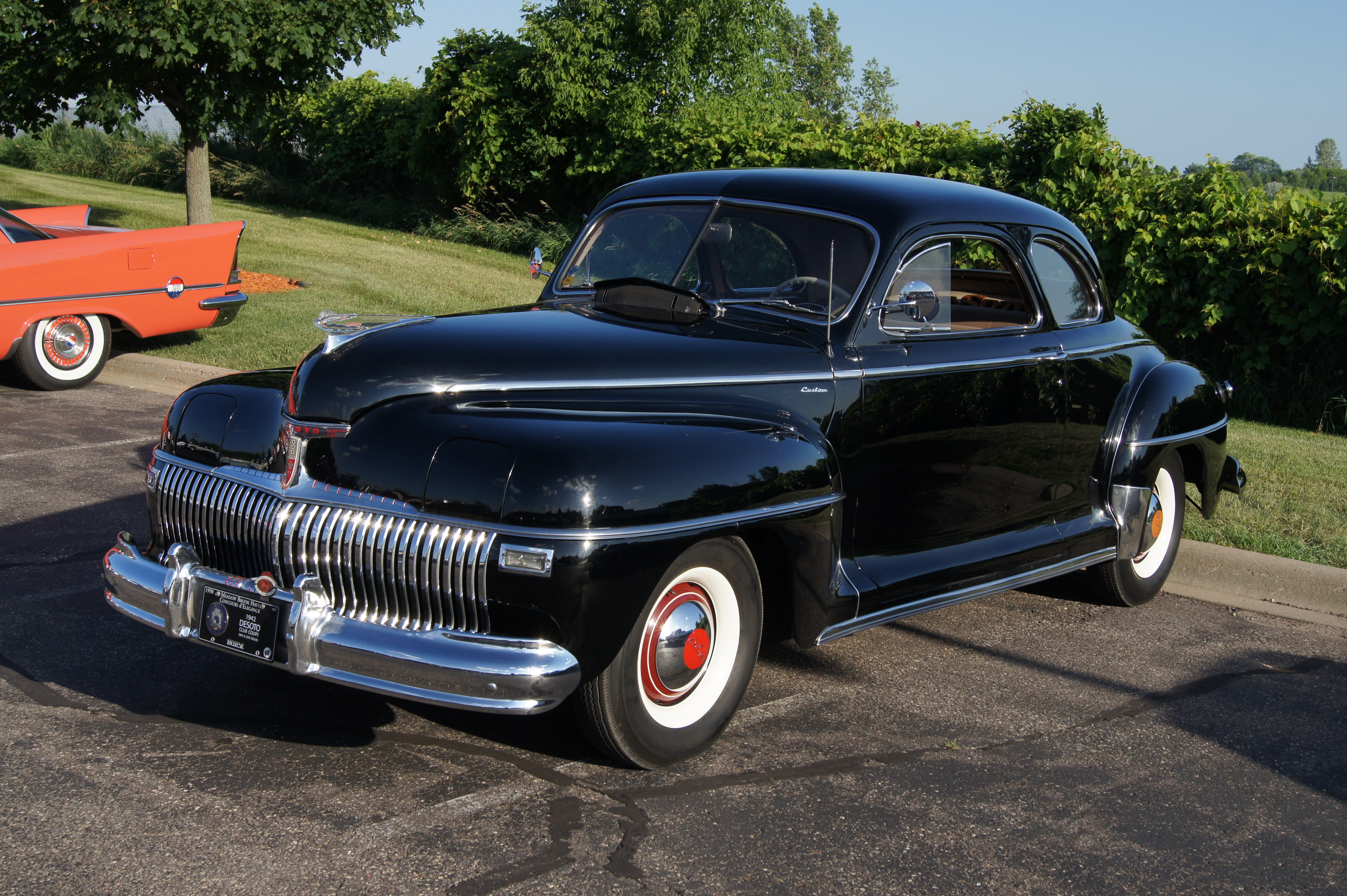
1942 DeSoto

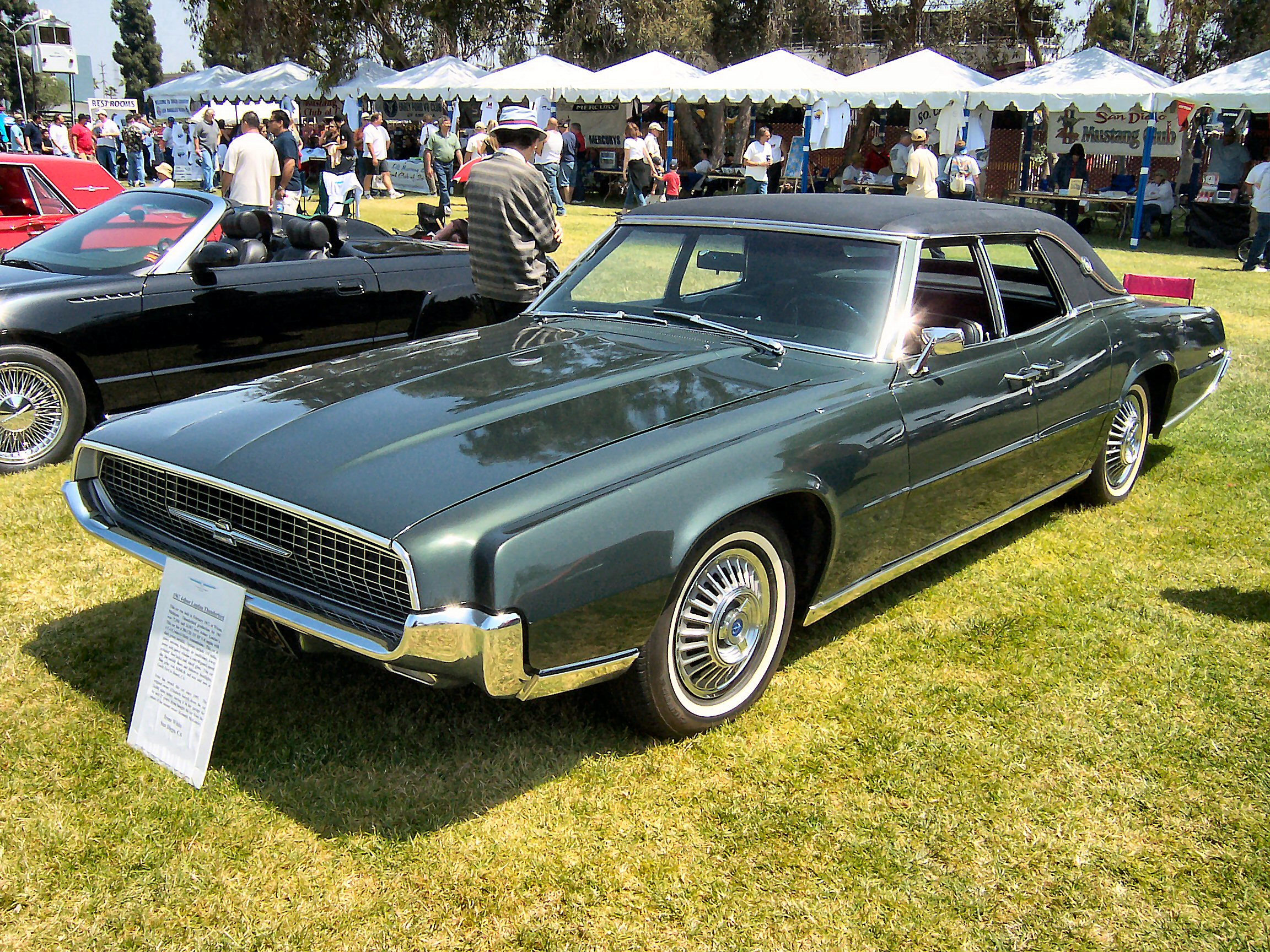
1967 Ford Thunderbird

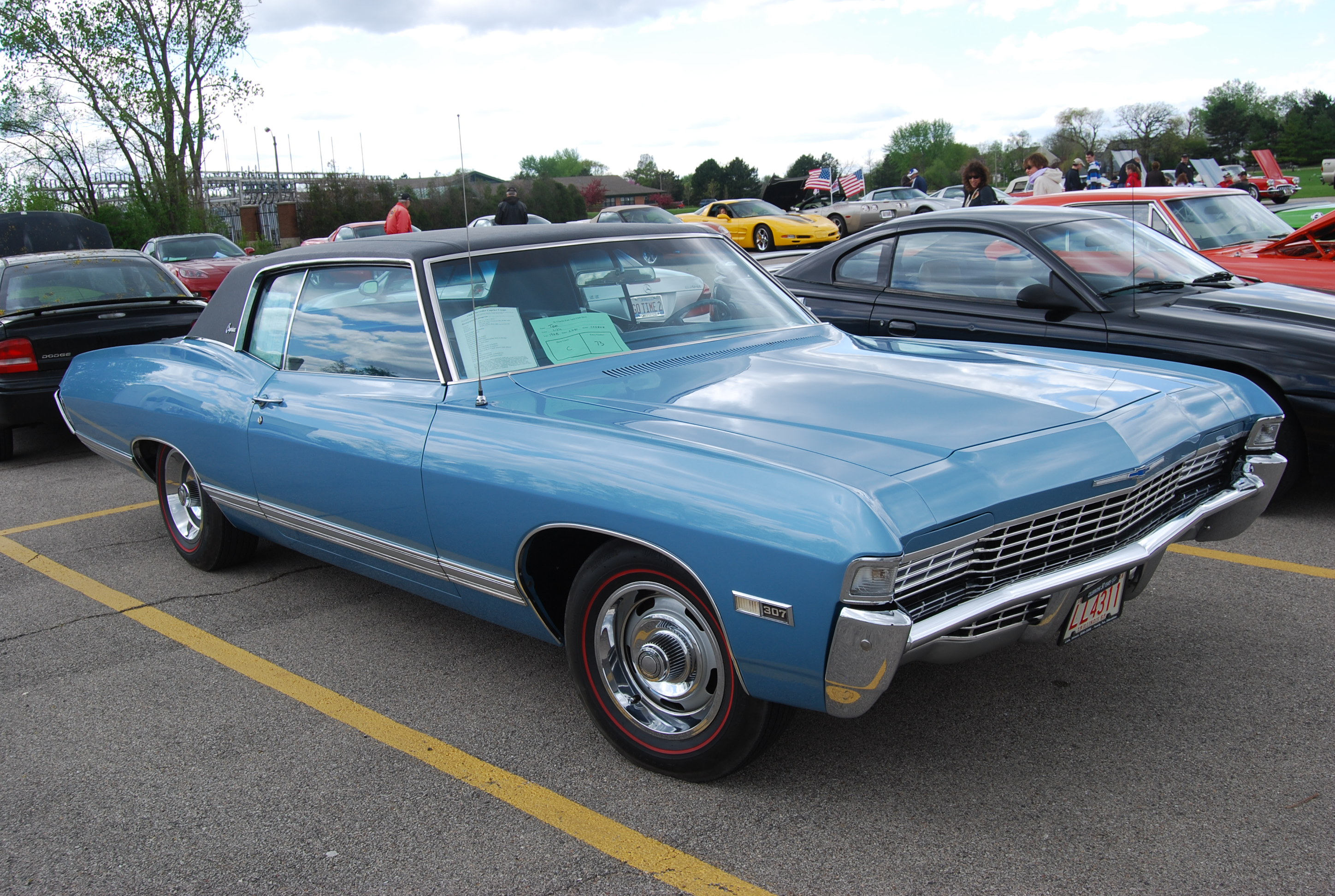
1968 Chevrolet Caprice coupe

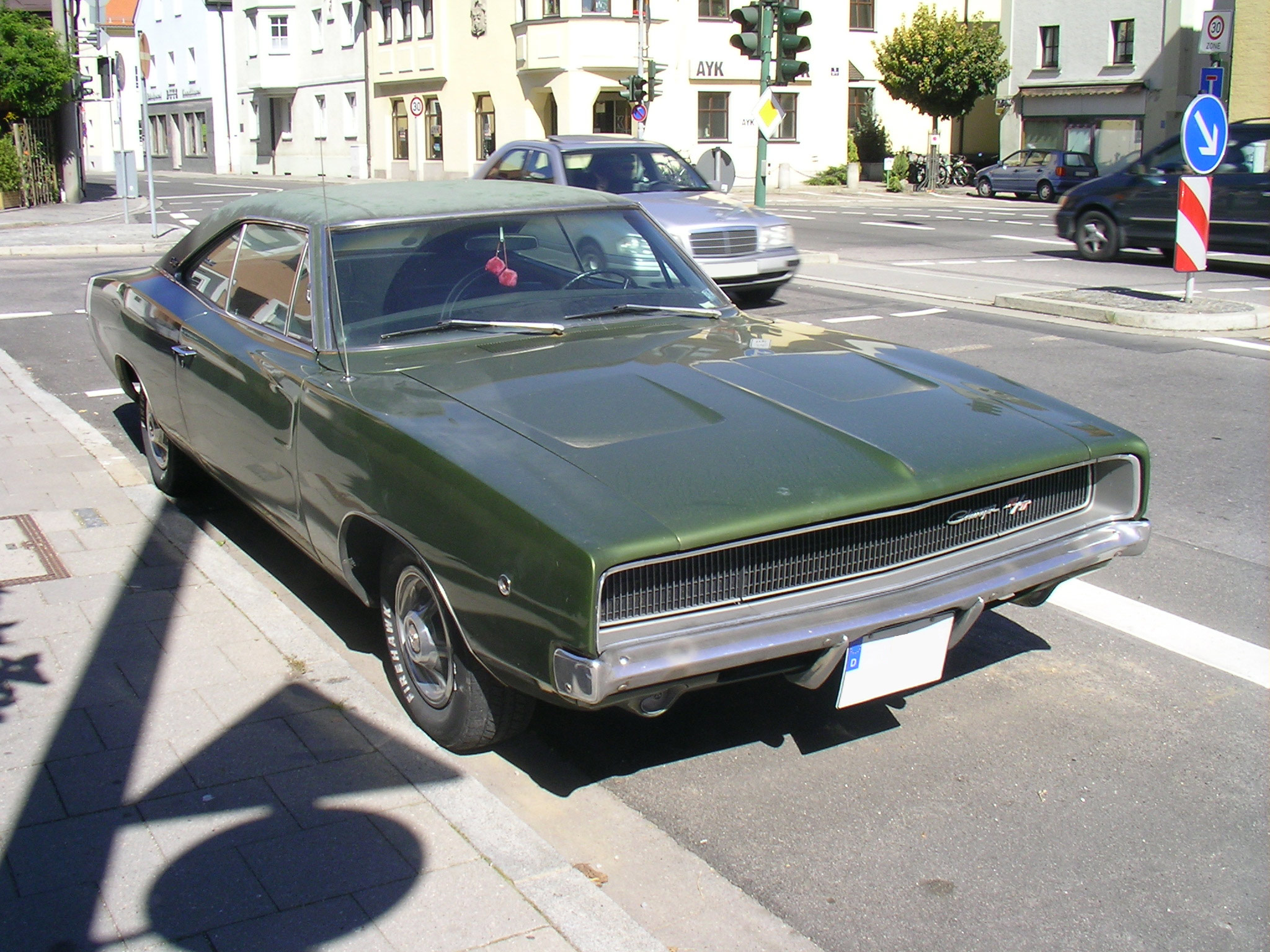
1968 Dodge Charger RT

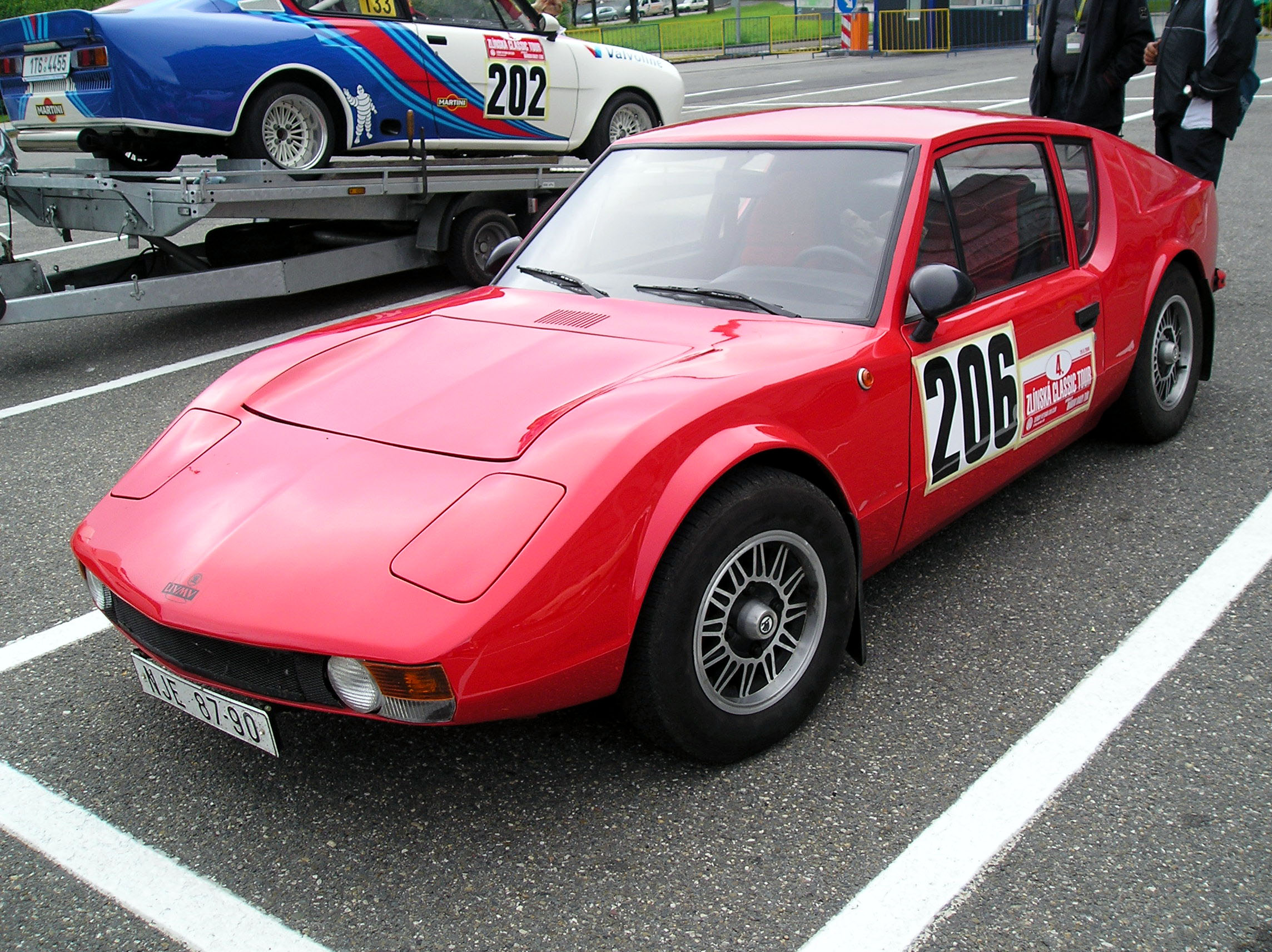
1970 Škoda 1100 GT

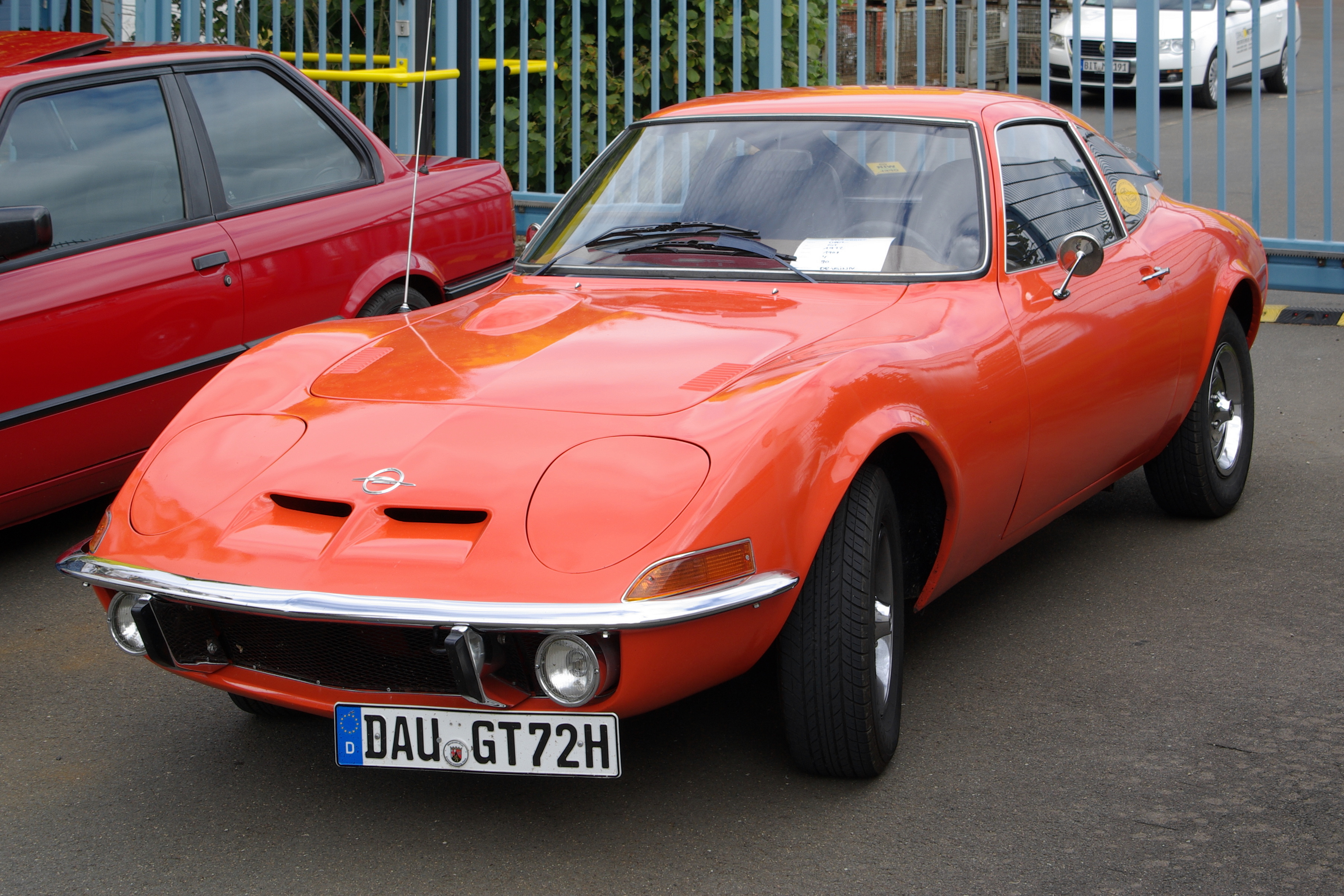
1972 Opel GT

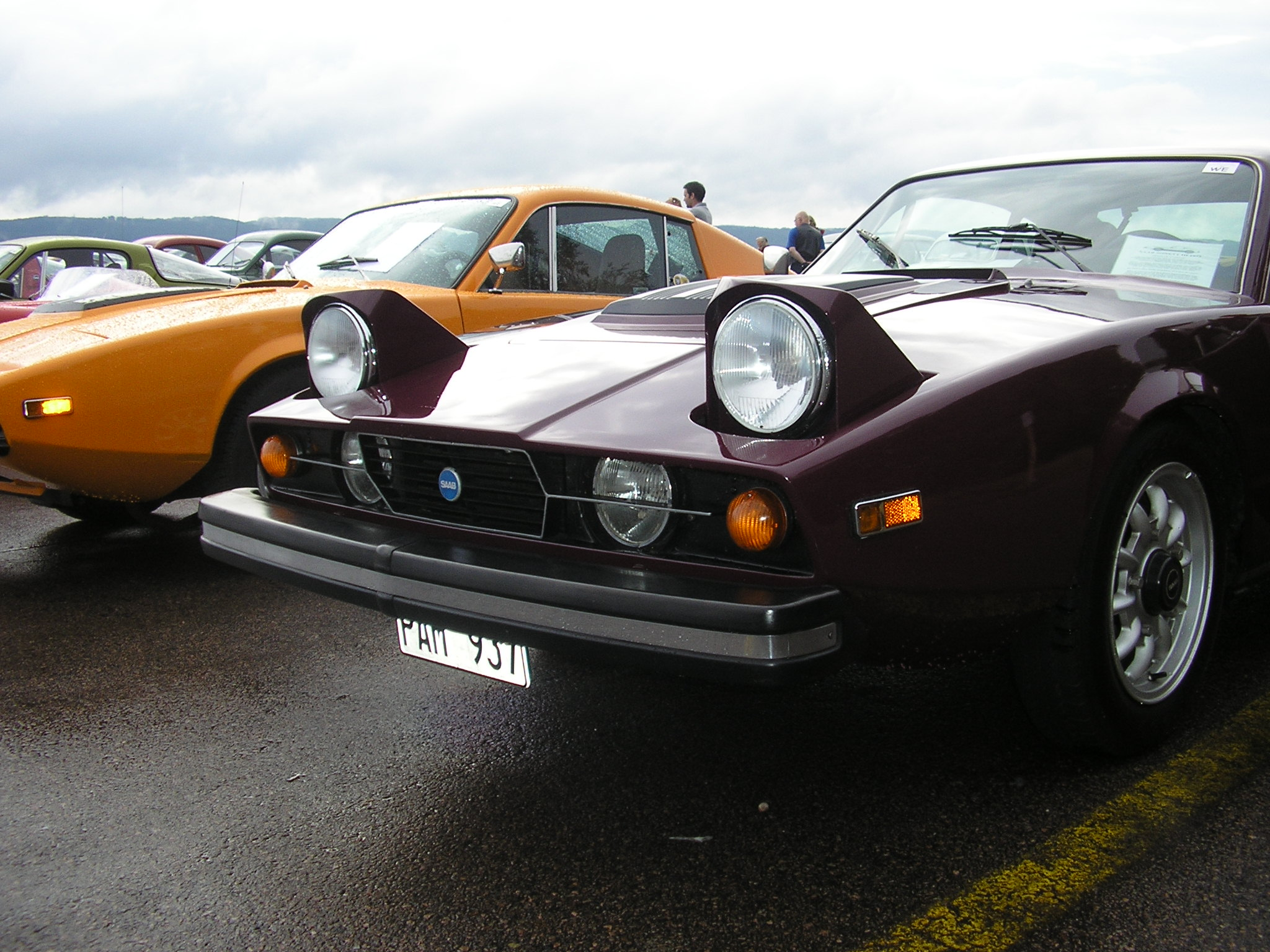
1973 SAAB Sonett III

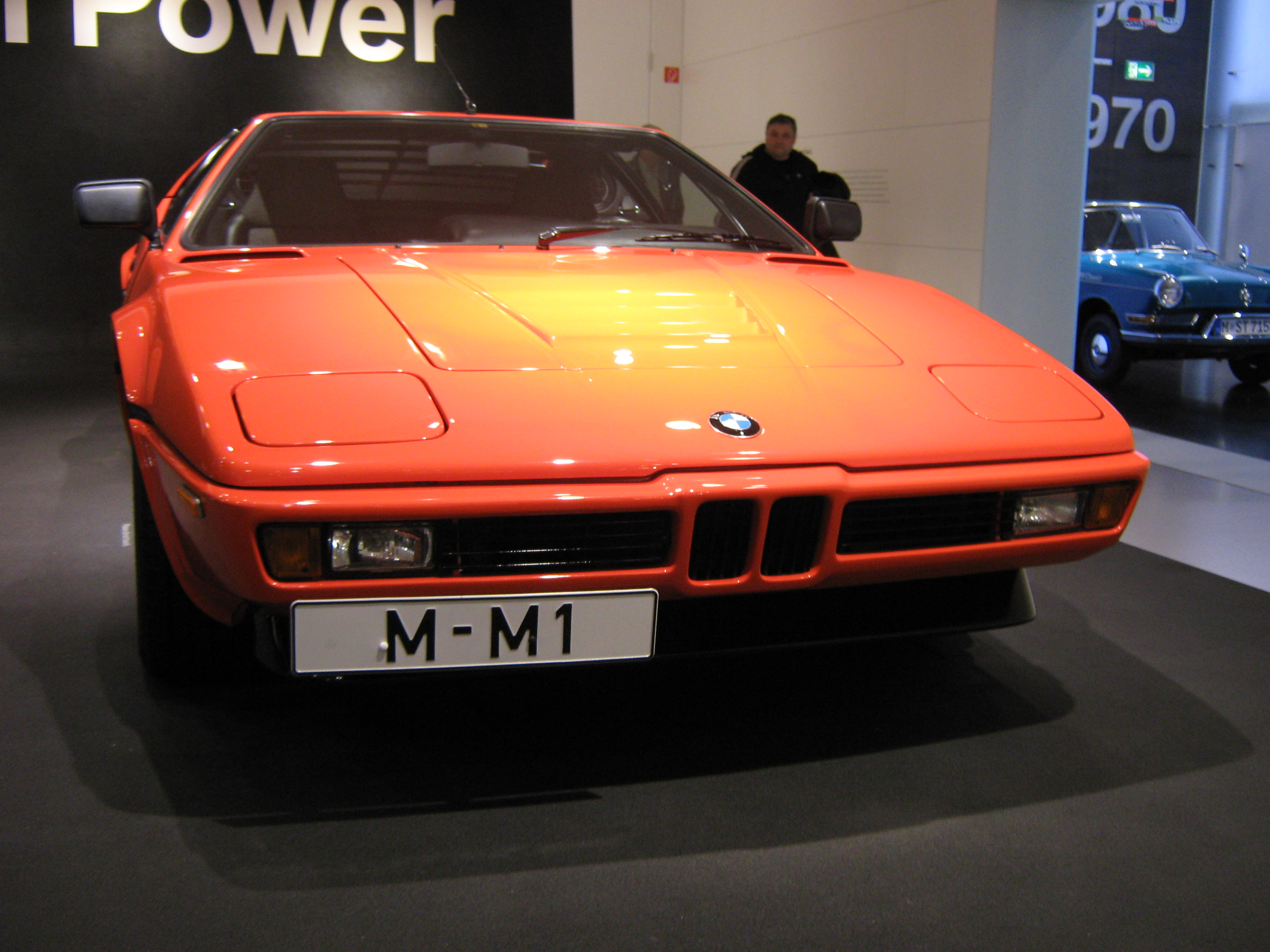
1978 BMW M1

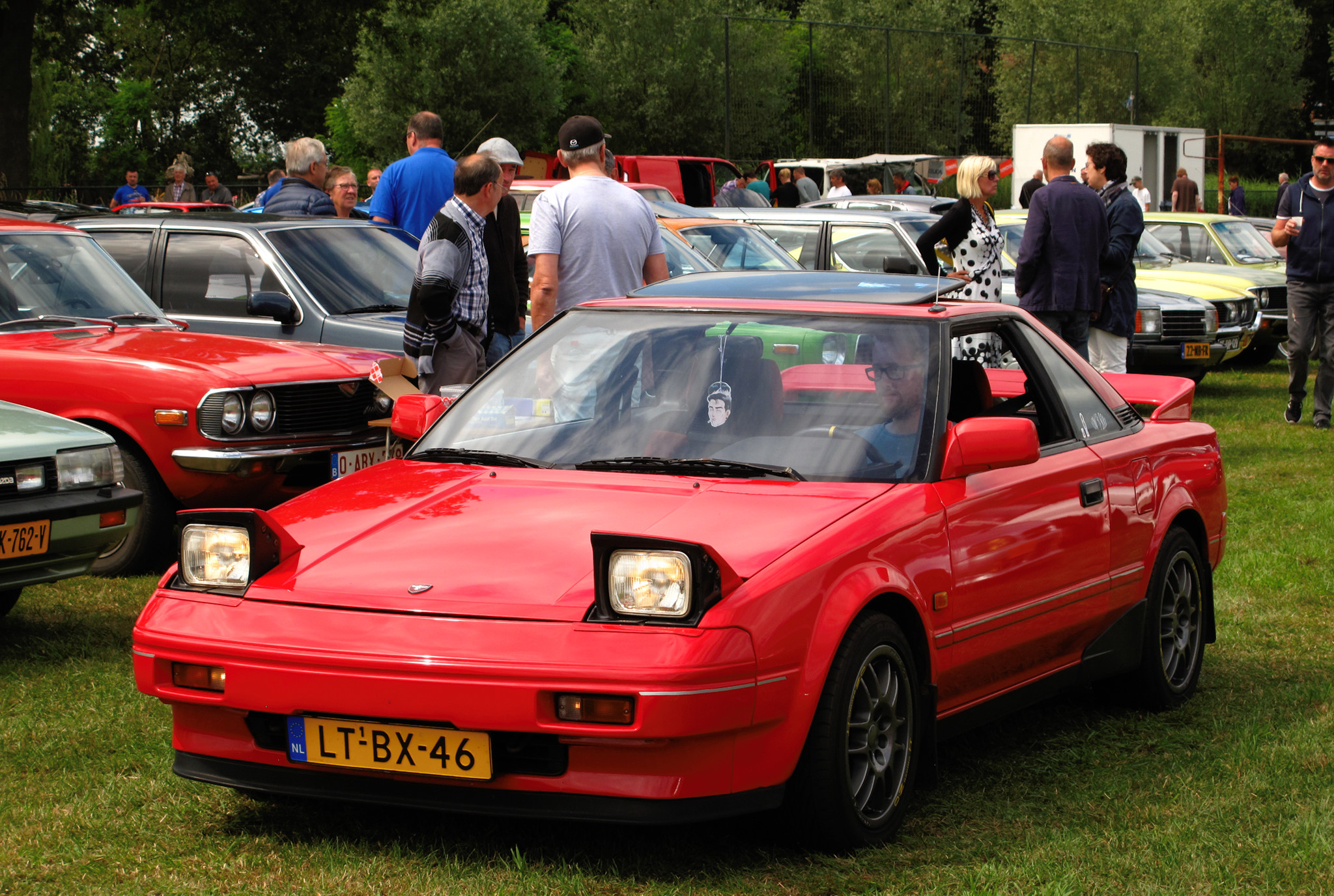
1986 Toyota MR2

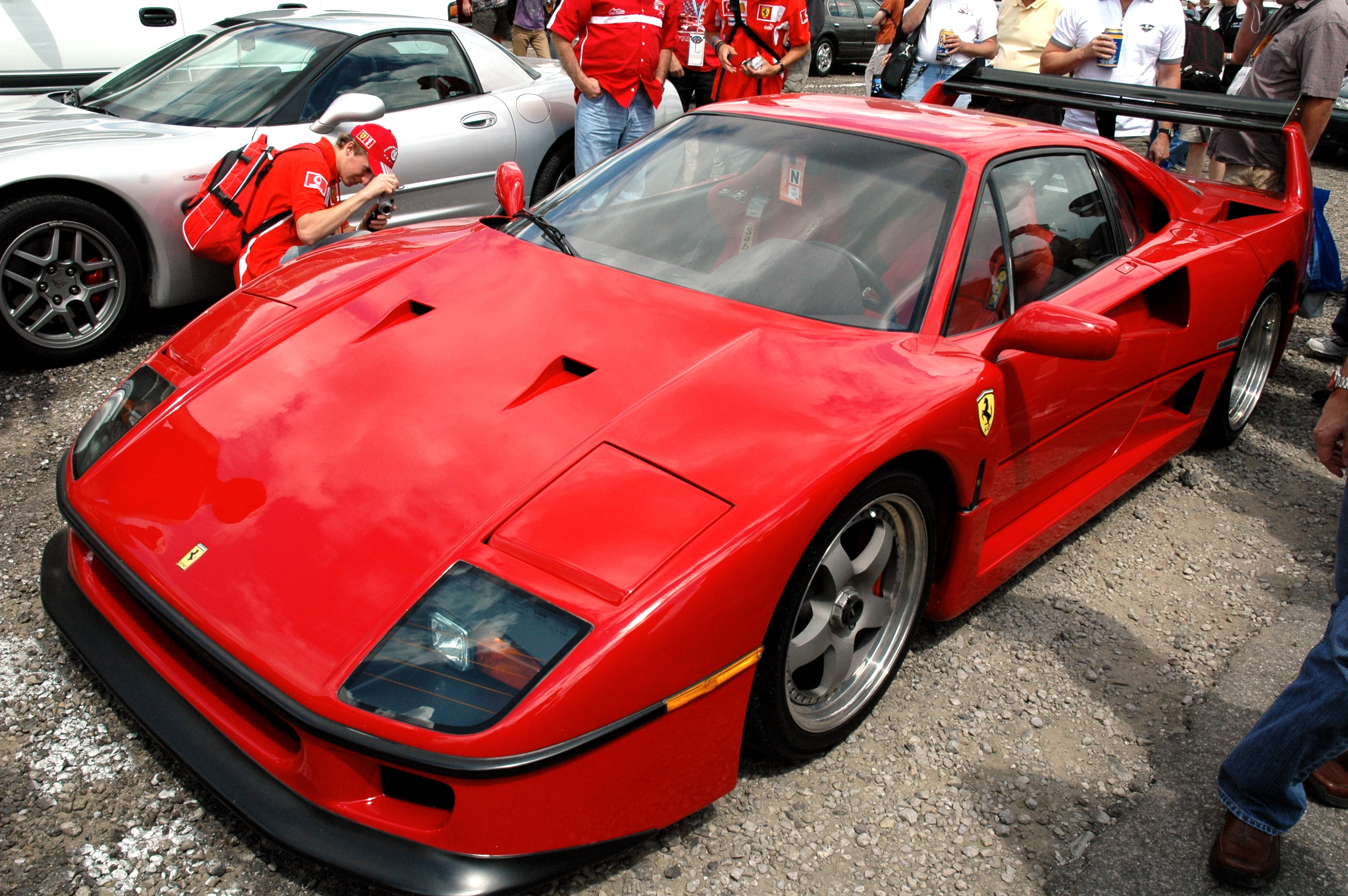
1987 Ferrari F40

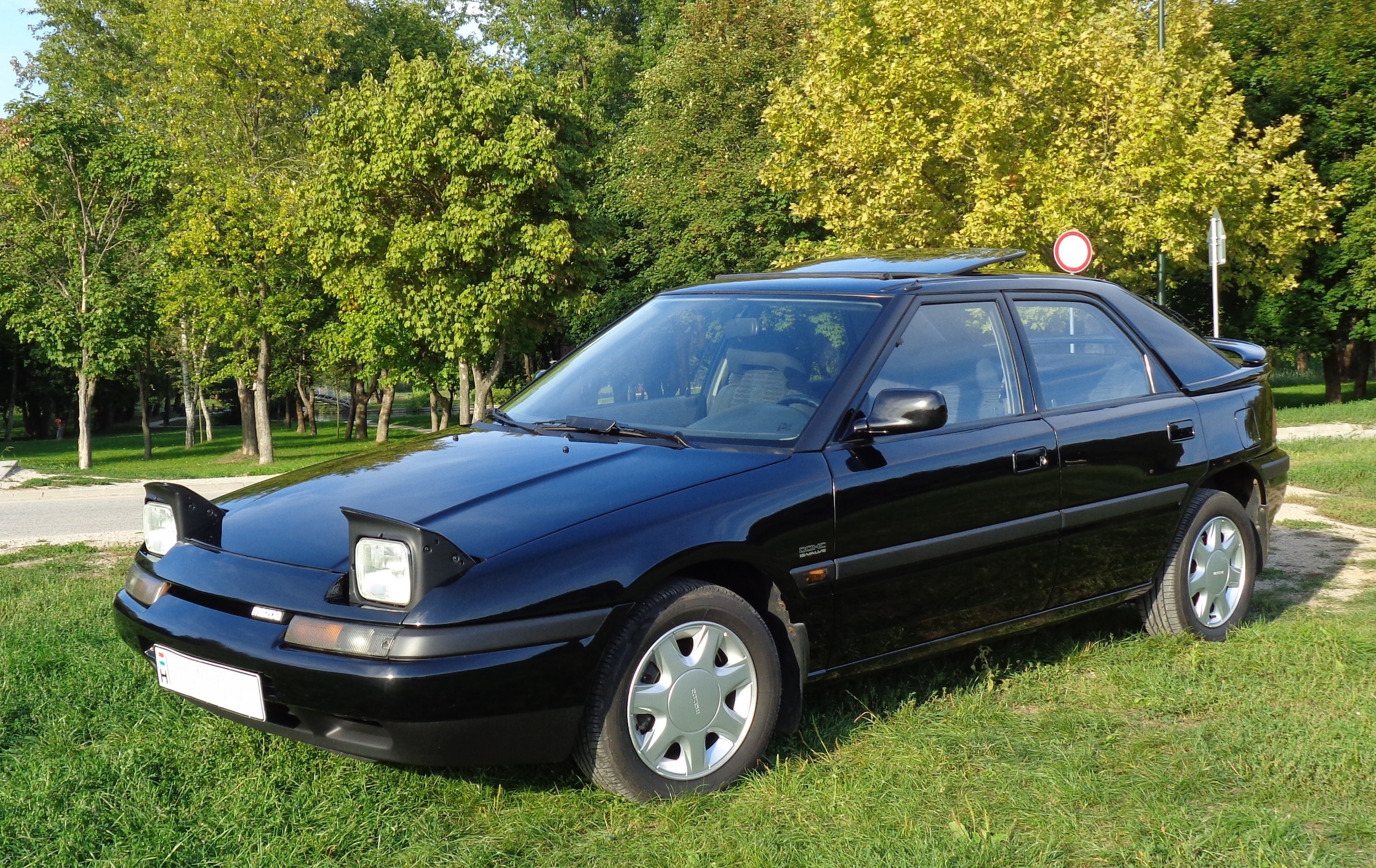
1989 Mazda 323F

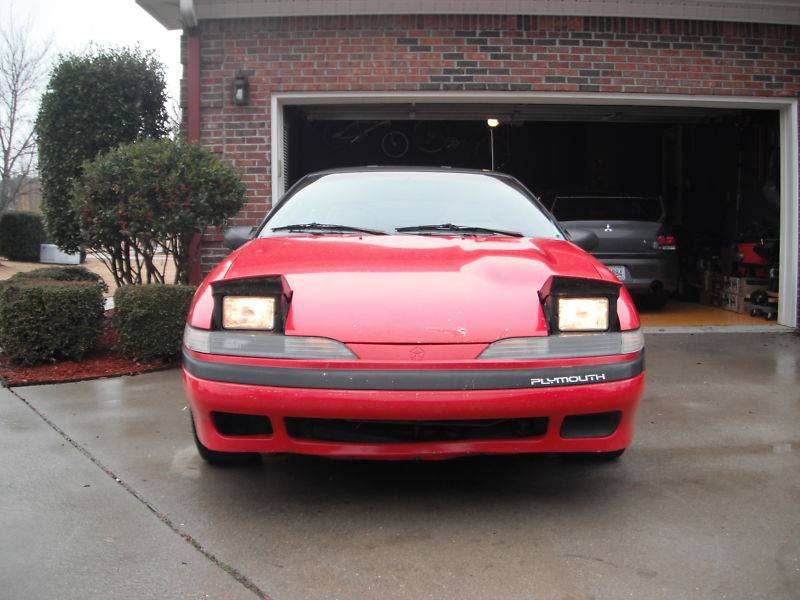
1990 Plymouth Laser

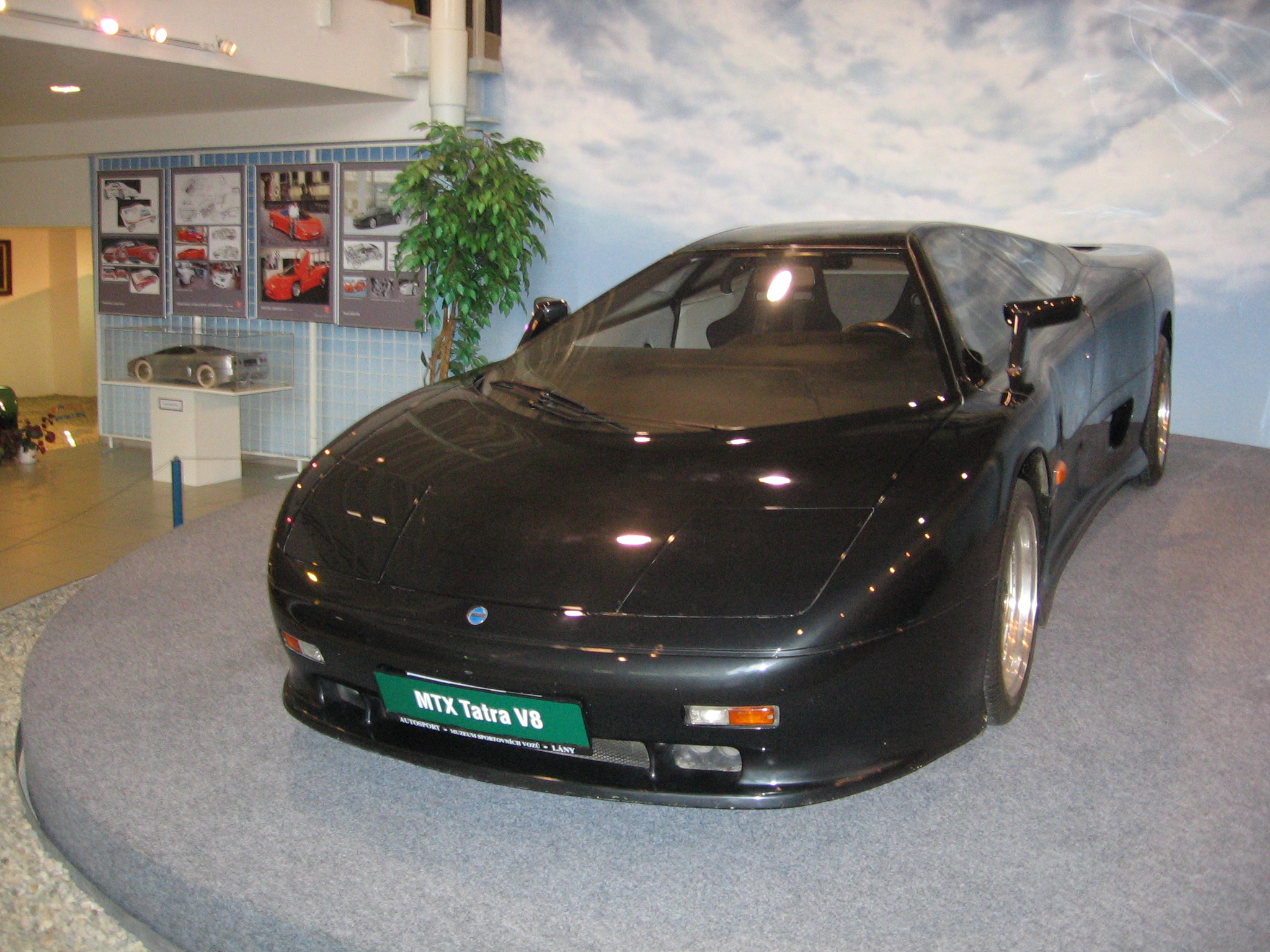
1991 Tatra MTX V8

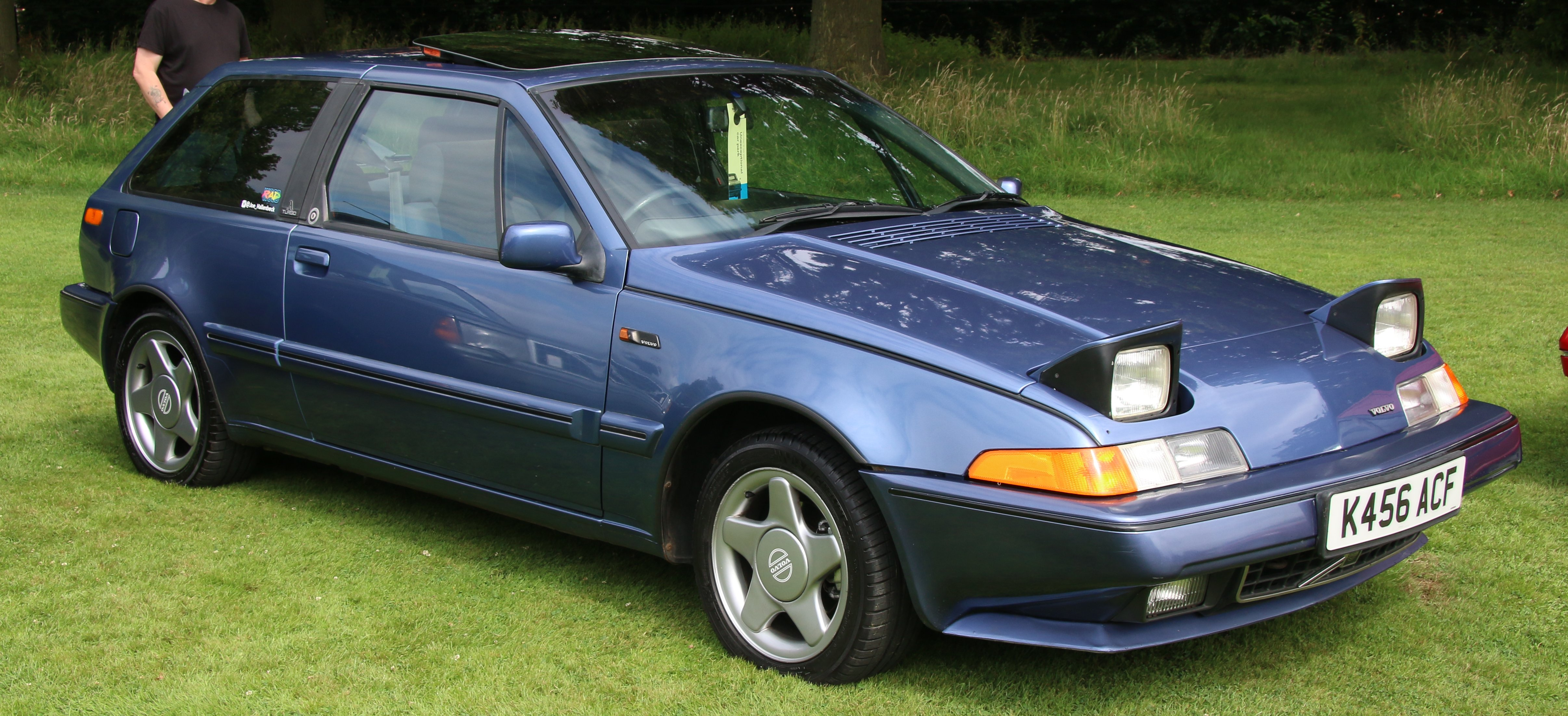
1992 Volvo 480

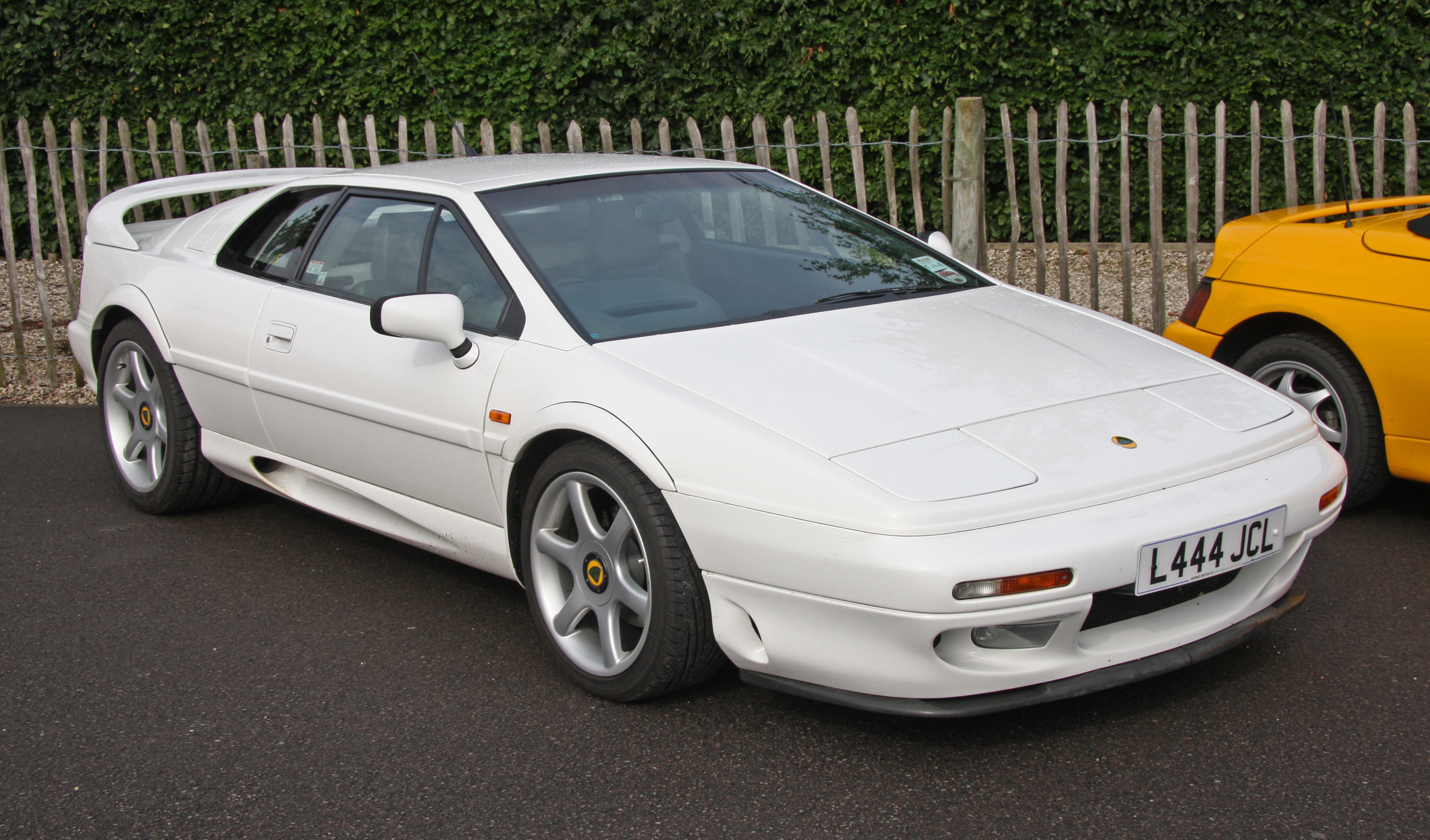
1995 Lotus Esprit

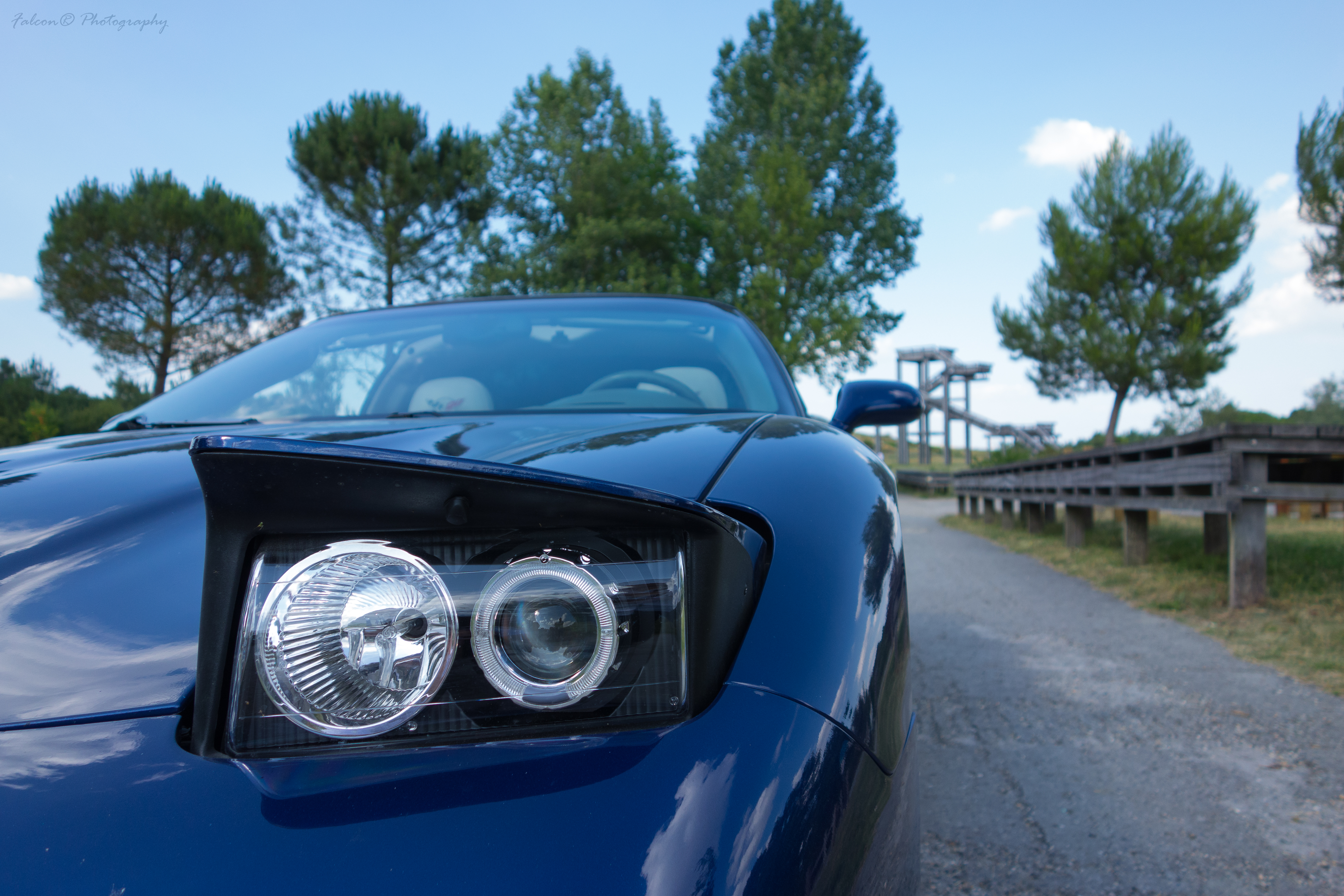
2004 Chevrolet Corvette

== See also ==
- Daytime running lamp
- List of vehicles with hidden headlamps
