= Zender GmbH =

German automotive aftermarket company

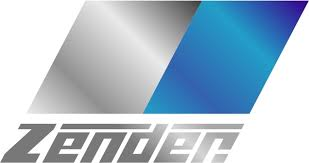
- Industry: Automotive
- Founded: 1969
- Founder: Hans-Albert Zender
- Defunct: 2008
- Website: zender-historie.de

Zender GmbH was a vehicle tuning company founded by Hans-Albert Zender, which existed from 1969 to 2008. The company worked with Ford, Volkswagen, Fiat and Opel.

== History ==
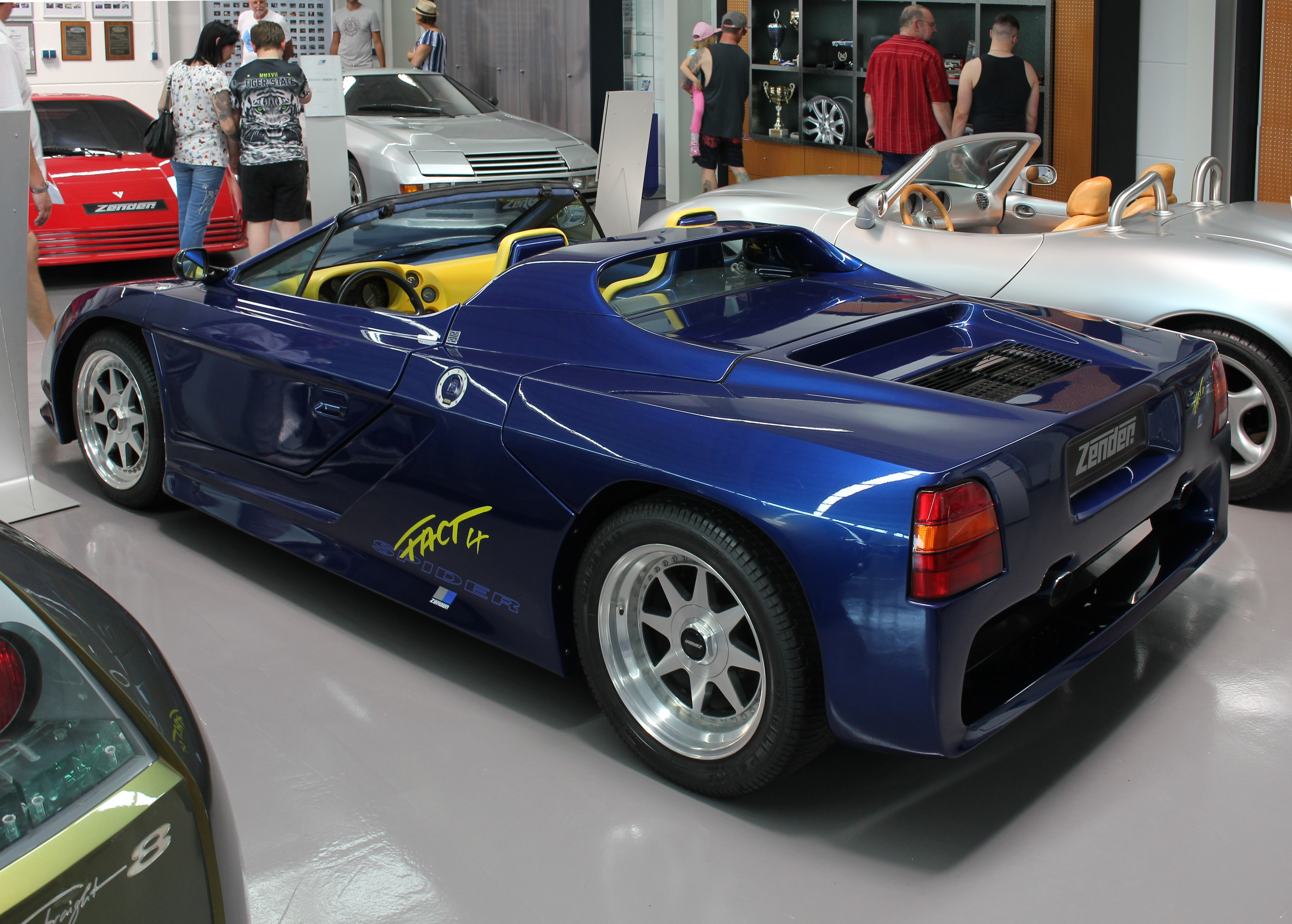
Zender Fact 4 (1991) in the Zender Museum

In 1969, at the age of 23, Hans-Albert Zender founded the company HAZ. He produced individual car bucket seats on special request and fender extensions made of glass fiber reinforced plastic for the NSU TT in Bassenheim near Koblenz.

From 1974, Zender produced body parts made of ABS plastic and polyurethane foam. Ford became a customer. A contract with Volkswagen followed in 1975 for Scirocco Cup vehicles to produce fender extensions, front spoilers, and rear spoilers. In 1977, the Zender study "VW Scirocco - Group 5" was presented. In 1978, the first Zender light alloy wheel came on the market. In 1979, the company moved to Mülheim-Kärlich. In 1983, Zender created the Vision 1 design study based on the Audi Quattro. A year later the Vision 1S followed with futuristic-looking lines and butterfly doors. In 1989, the Fact 4 Biturbo prototype premiered at the IAA in Frankfurt, the first road-approved sports car in the world equipped with a monocoque made from carbon fiber reinforced plastic. In 1991, the Fact 4 Spider followed as an open top version. Following that, in 1995, the Progetto 5 was introduced, a roadster based on the Alfa Romeo 75 platform.

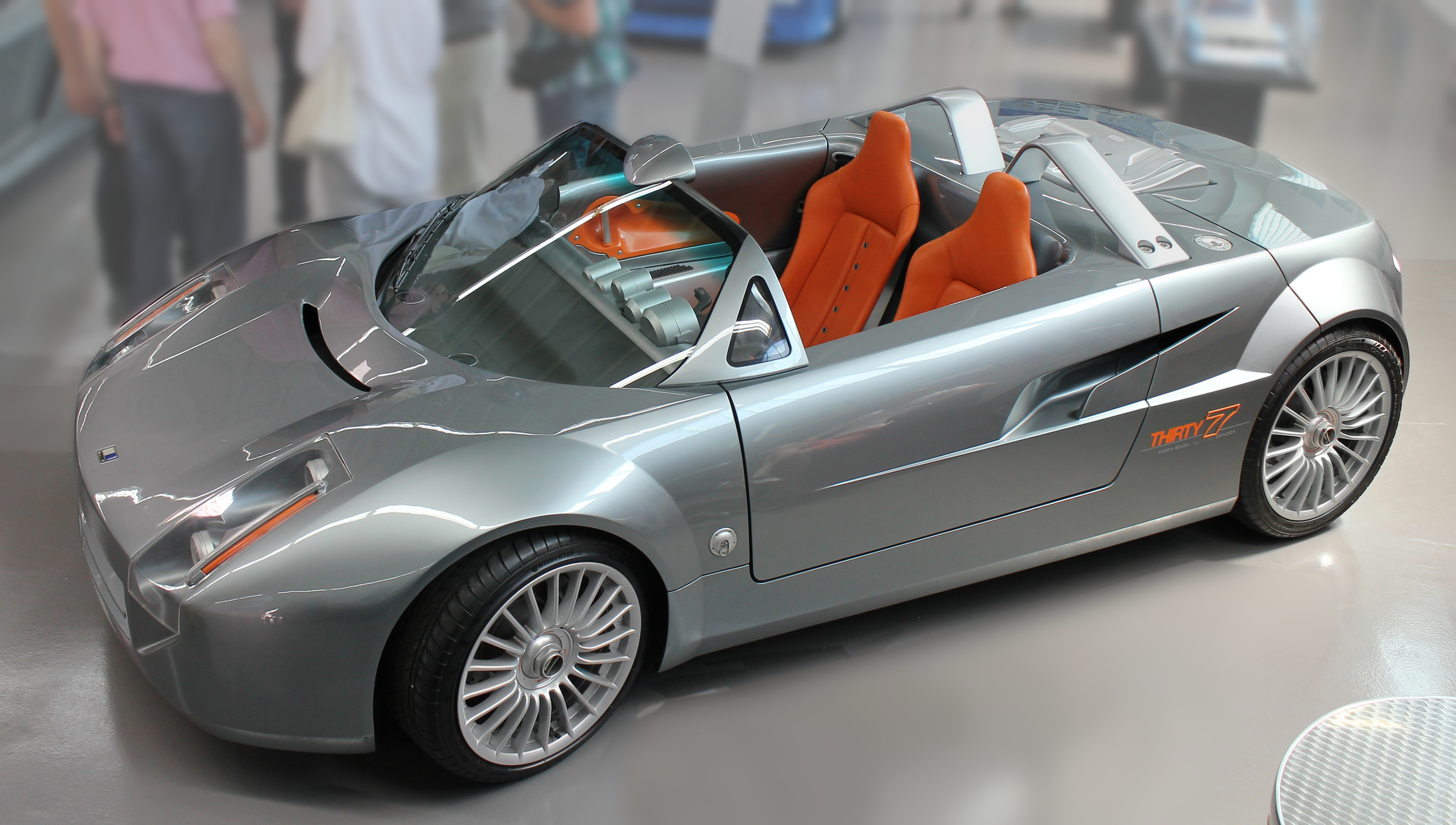
Zender Thirty 7 (1999)

In 1999, the Zender Thirty 7, or 30-7, was presented at the Frankfurt Auto Show. It was powered by a 1.8L Volkswagen I4 engine producing 230 PS (169 kW; 227 hp), and giving it a top speed of 240 km/h (149 mph). Shortly after, in 2001, the Roadster Straight 8 was presented. It used a 3.2-liter six-cylinder engine from BMW with an output of 321 PS (236 kW; 317 hp), which helped it reach a top speed of 250 km/h (155 mph). In 2000, the Zender Modification Center in Italy was put into operation for special series production for Fiat and the Opel Special Vehicle for the conversion of Opel special vehicles.

On September 1st 2008, the tuning business unit was discontinued. The car dealership continues to exist with Michael Zender as managing director.
