= Evante =

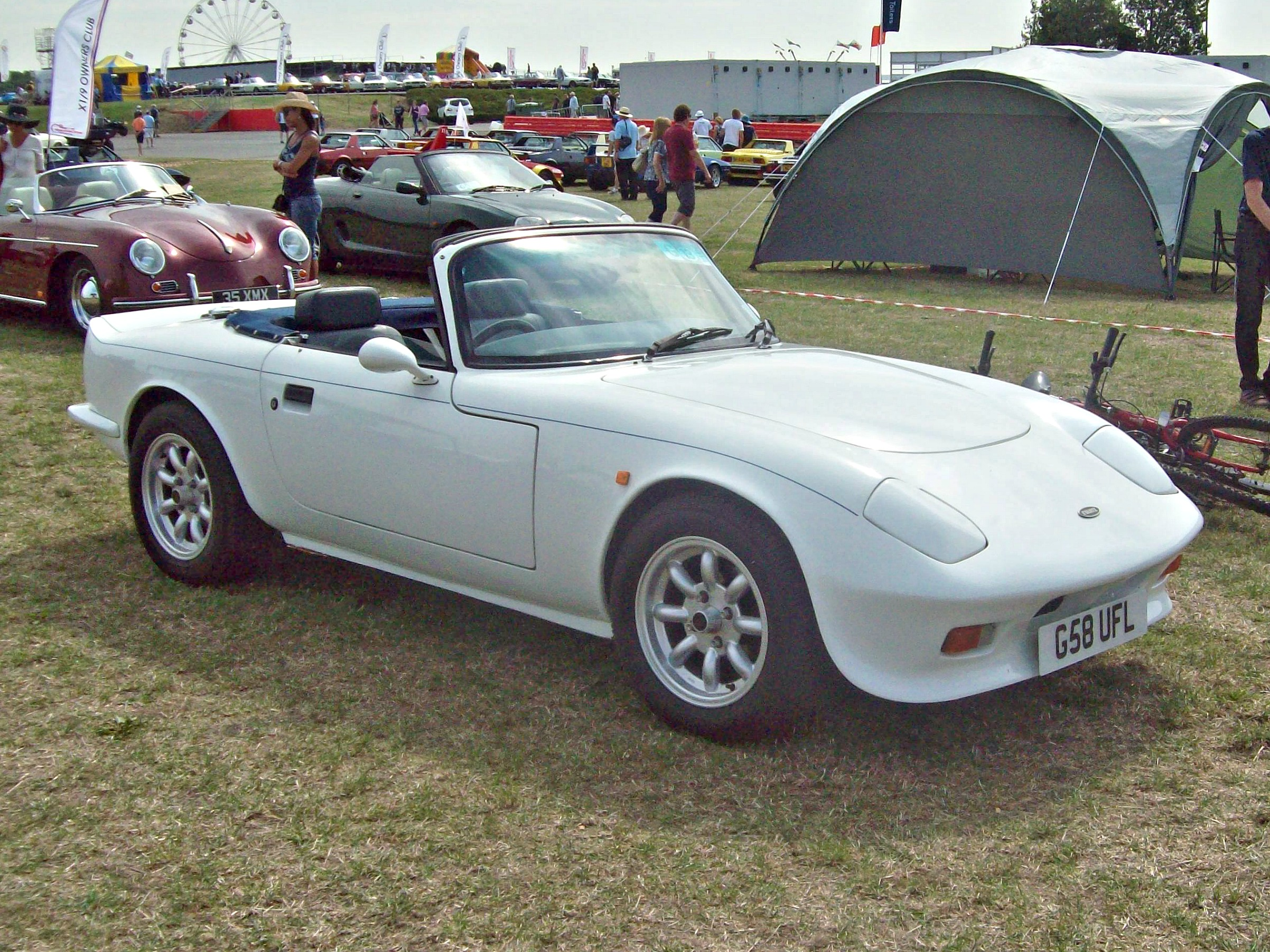
- A 1990 Evante Sports 1700 Mk. 1

Overview
- Manufacturer: Evante Cars Ltd; Fleur de Lys Automobile manufacturing
- Production: 1983–1994

Body and chassis
- Class: Sports car
- Body style: 2-door convertible
- Layout: FR layout

Powertrain
- Engine: 1.6 or 1.7 L Vegantune inline-4 1.8 L Ford Zetec
- Transmission: 5-speed manual

Dimensions
- Wheelbase: 2,140 mm (84.3 in)
- Length: 3,720 mm (146.5 in)
- Width: 1,490 mm (58.7 in)
- Height: 1,130 mm (44.5 in)
- Curb weight: 720 kg (1,587 lb)

The Evante, designed and invented by George Walter Robinson, is an English automobile which began production in 1987 in Spalding, Lincolnshire, England. Engine tuning company Vegantune had been restoring Lotus Elan cars and making some improvements to them. They decided to build a complete new car and set up a separate company, Evante Cars Ltd, to make them.

The Evante's design was heavily inspired by the Lotus Elan and it was powered by the Ford Kent based Vegantune VTA 1.6 and later 1.7-litre twin overhead cam engine driving the rear wheels through a gearbox originally from a Ford Sierra. The 1.6 L engine produced 140 bhp (104 kW) at 6500 rpm and 129 lb⋅ft (175 N⋅m) at 3000 rpm as standard, with a 160 bhp (119 kW) version also offered, which featured bigger ports, high-lift camshafts and an increase in the compression ratio from 8.5:1 to 10.5:1. The later 1.7 L engines reportedly had a similar power output but increased torque. The fibreglass body was mounted onto a tubular steel space frame chassis. It featured independent double wishbone suspension all round, with coil springs and telescopic dampers, ditching the rear Chapman struts of the Elan. Disc brakes were fitted front and rear. Mk1 cars were fitted with Triumph TR7 taillights, while later Mk2 models used the taillights from a Volkswagen Golf Mk2. The interiors were fitted with Connolly Leather seats, walnut dashboard and electric windows, with much of the switchgear shared with the Ford Escort.

Acceleration from 0-60 mph (97 km/h) for the standard 1.6 L model reportedly took 6.4 seconds, with a top speed of 132 mph (212 km/h).

The first prototype was shown in late 1982, but production didn't begin until 1987. The cars were initially intended to be available as either complete or in kit form, but all cars were supplied fully built and were produced at a rate of about one a week.

Production stopped in 1991 when the original company failed, at which point 106 cars had been built, but the design was bought by Fleur de Lys, who specialised in making retro styled vans. They redeveloped the car to take a Ford Zetec 1.8 Litre engine, but only nine more cars were made.

An attempt was made to revive the car in 2001, but this was unsuccessful. Spydercars Whittlesey now own the rights to the name and the fibre glass moulds.

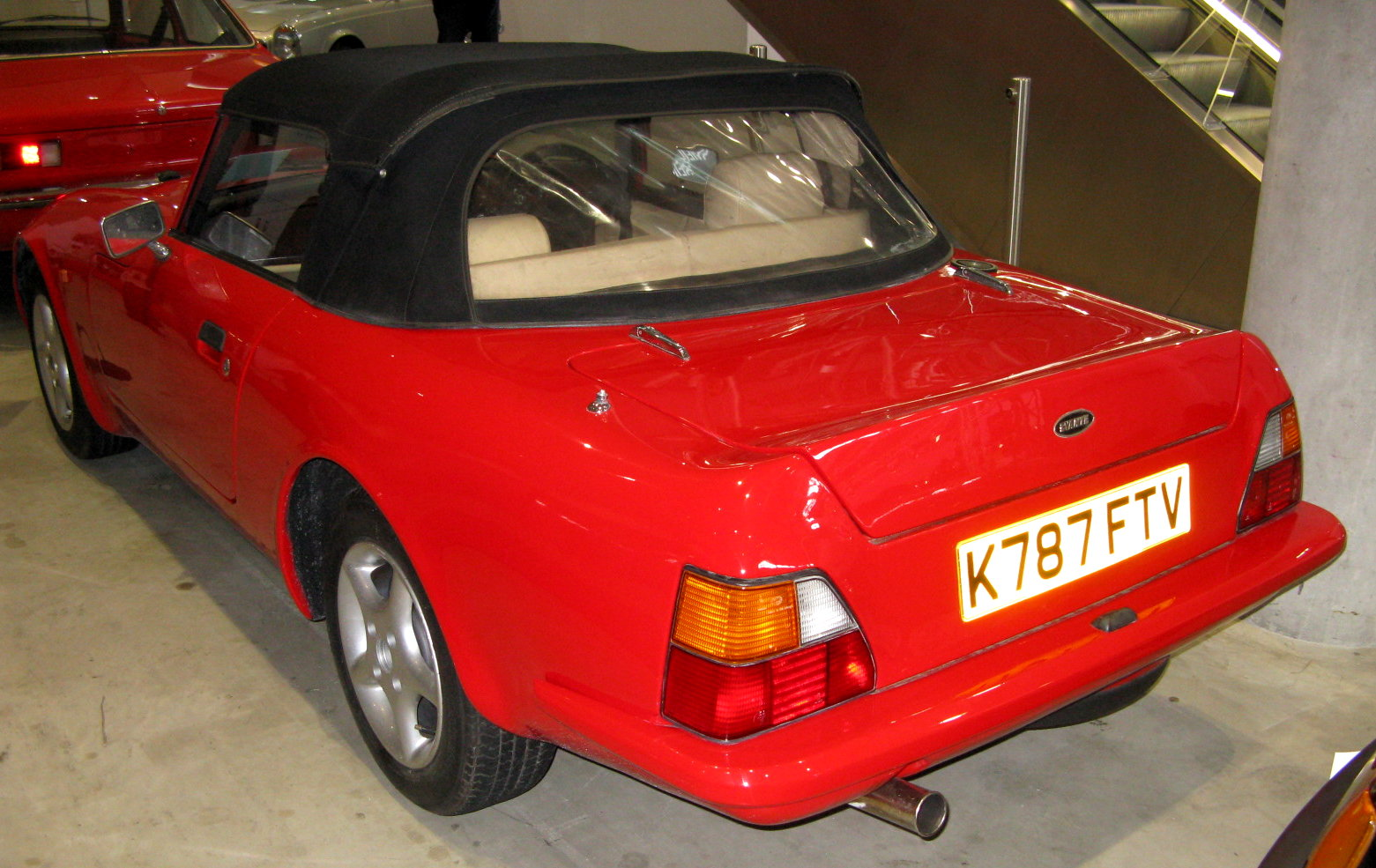
1993 Evante Sports 1600 Mk. 2 rear view

== See also ==
- List of car manufacturers of the United Kingdom

== Sources ==
- David Burgess Wise, The New Illustrated Encyclopedia of Automobiles.
- Evante club
