= Mazda Iconic SP =

Concept car produced by Mazda

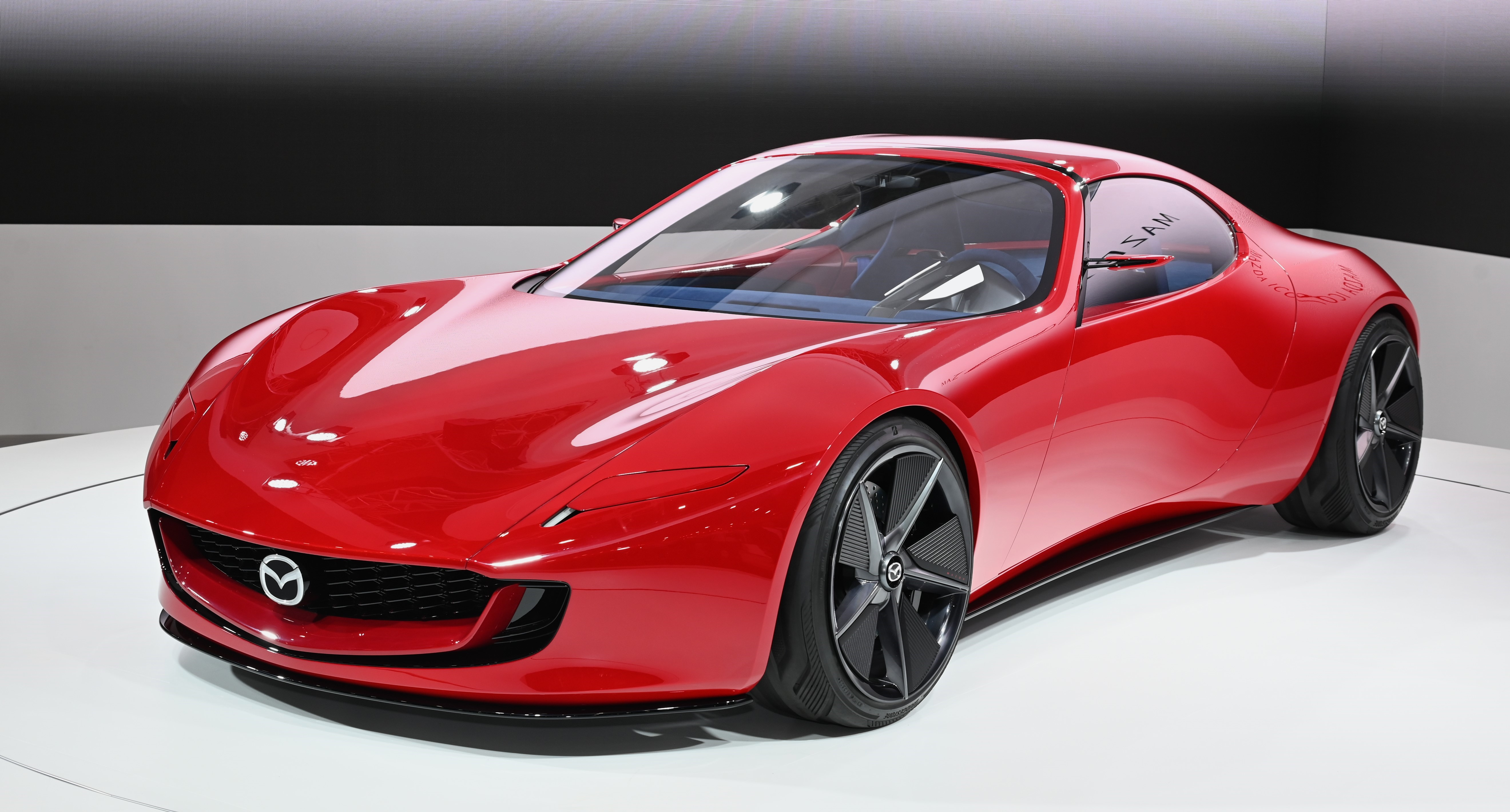

Overview
- Manufacturer: Mazda
- Production: 2023
- Designer: Masashi Nakayama

Body and chassis
- Class: Concept car
- Body style: 2-door coupé
- Layout: FR layout
- Doors: swan

Dimensions
- Wheelbase: 2,590 mm (102.0 in)
- Length: 4,180 mm (164.6 in)
- Width: 1,850 mm (72.8 in)
- Height: 1,150 mm (45.3 in)
- Curb weight: 1,450 kg (3,196.7 lb)

The Mazda Iconic SP is a concept sports car produced by Japanese car manufacturer Mazda. It was presented in 2023 at the Japan Mobility Show.

== Presentation ==
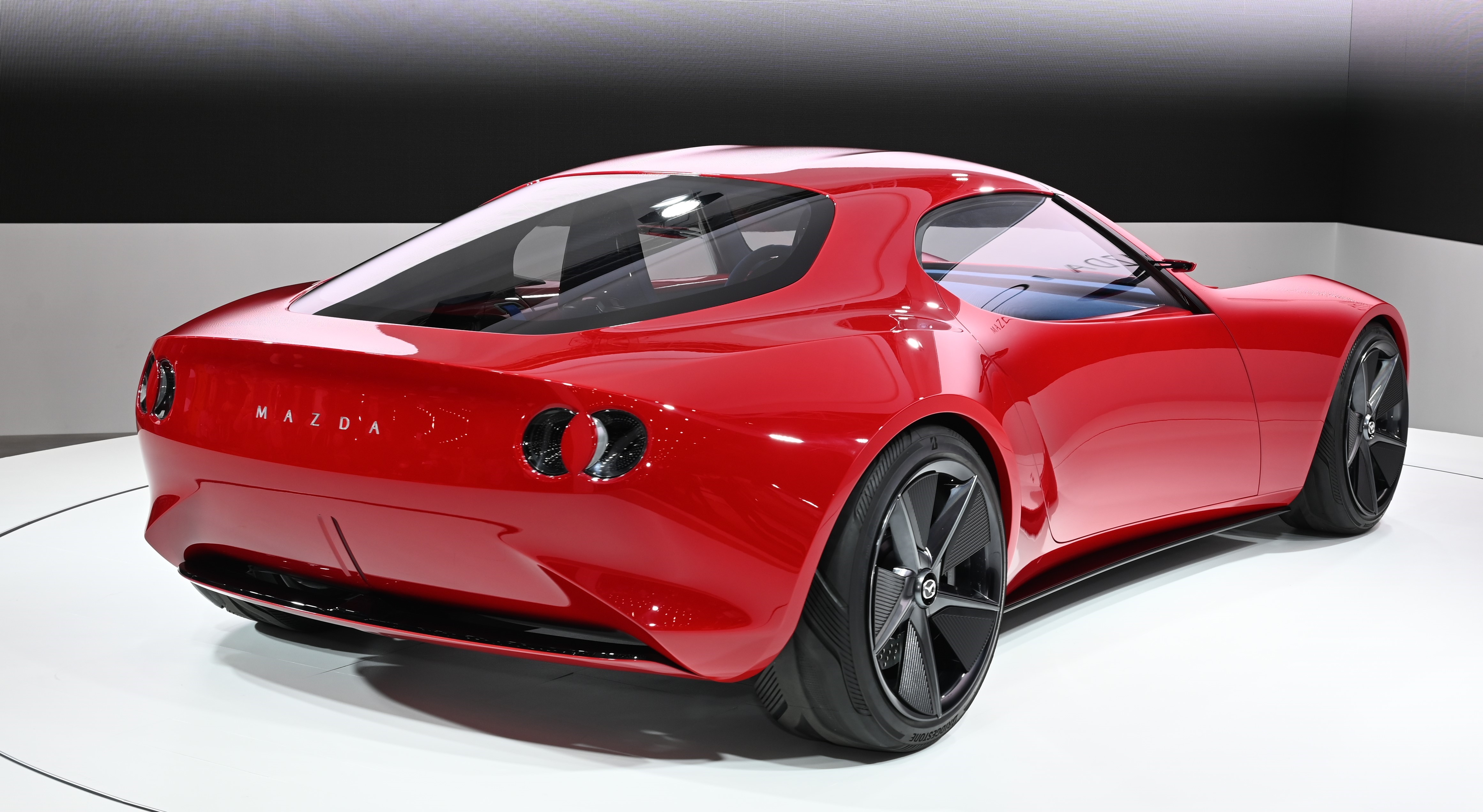
Rear view

The Iconic SP was presented at the Japan Mobility Show in October 2023.

== Specifications ==
The design of the Iconic SP was inspired by the FD Mazda RX-7. The car uses a two-rotor Rotary-EV system that uses a rotary engine that can use a variety of fuels, including hydrogen, making it virtually carbon neutral and also capable of supplying power to external sources. By placing the engine closer to the center of the vehicle, a low bonnet has been achieved, and the vehicle itself has a low center of gravity with even weight distribution front and rear. The Iconic SP also features pop-up headlights.
