= Probe 16 =

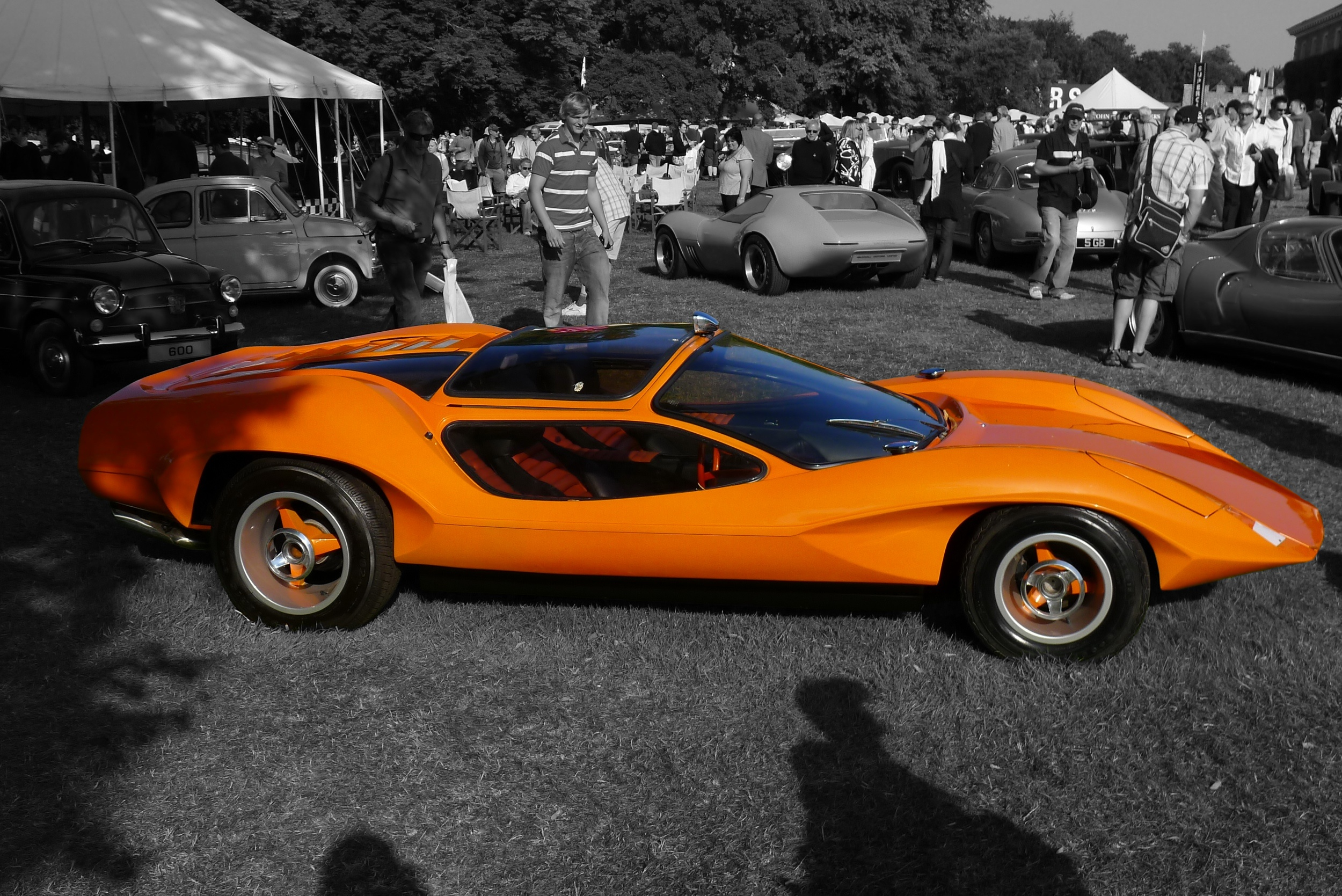

Overview
- Manufacturer: Adams Brothers
- Production: 1969
- Designer: Dennis Adams, Peter Adams

Body and chassis
- Class: Sports car
- Body style: 1-door Sports car
- Layout: MR layout

Powertrain
- Engine: 1798 cc B-Series pushrod Straight-4

Dimensions
- Height: 34 in (86 cm)

Chronology
- Successor: Probe 2001

The M-505 Adams Brothers Probe 16 is a car, designed by former Marcos cars designers Dennis and Peter Adams, (Bradford-on-Avon, Wiltshire, England) in 1969 as 'an investigation into extremes of styling'. It is powered by a mid-mounted tuned Austin 1800 engine and is 34 inches (86 cm) in height. It has 12" wheels on the front and 15" wheels on the back. Entry is via a sliding glass roof.

Only three were ever produced. The first - AB/2, license plate MJO 145H – was sold to American songwriter Jimmy Webb. The second - AB/3, license plate PWV 222H - was sold to Cream bassist Jack Bruce, who then gave it to his musical partner in Bruce & Laing, Corky Laing, as a birthday gift. The third - AB/4, license plate JFB 220H - was owned originally by Robin Gibbons of England. All three cars are still in existence today with different owners.

== Film appearances ==
Robin Gibbons lent Stanley Kubrick his Probe 16 (AB/4) for use in filming in his 1971 film, A Clockwork Orange. In the film, it is referred to as "Durango 95". In the TV programme Top Gear (Series 5, second episode, aired 31 October 2004), the one used in the film was nominated for restoration in the "Restoration Rip-off" feature, but it was out-voted by Paddy Hopkirk's Mini for restoration. The car was subsequently restored by Club Autosport Ltd.

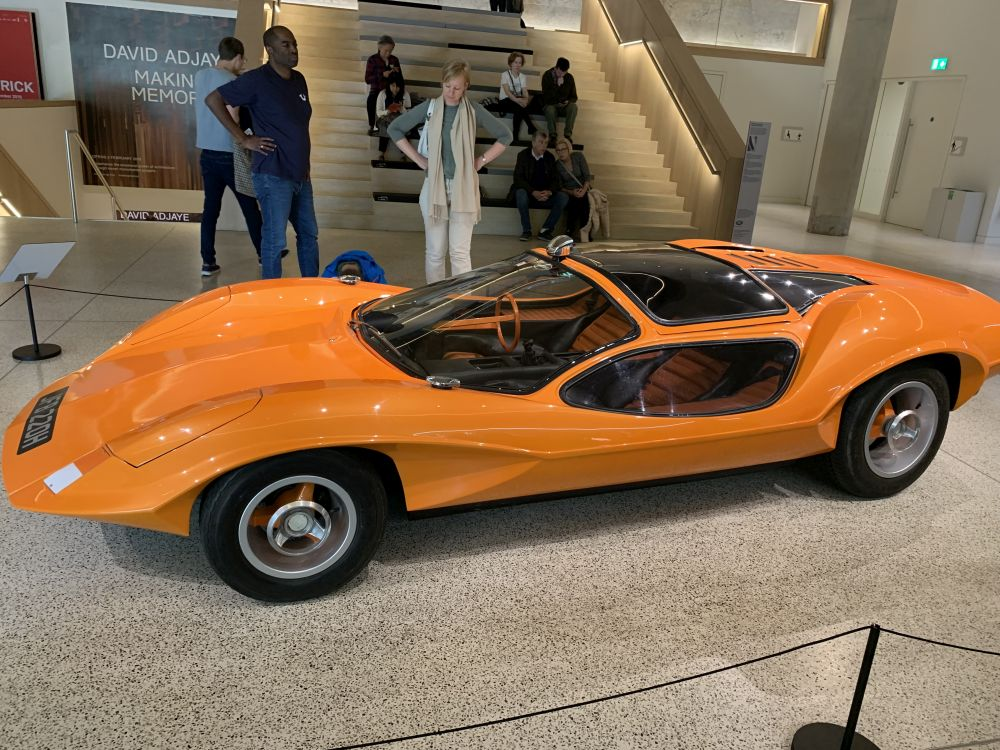
The Probe 16 / Durango 95 from A Clockwork Orange, on display at Stanley Kubrick: The Exhibition held at the Design Museum of London in 2019

=== Vehicle specifications ===
Designers / builders	Dennis and Peter Adams, Bradford-on-Avon, UK
Total production	Three
Year	1969
Engine	1800 CC in-line four, transversely mounted
	BLMC 1800cc Mk2 bored-out
Carburetor	Weber DCOE 40
Race tuned by	Janspeed Engineering, UK
Body	Fibreglass
Height	34"

== Probe series ==
A previous model, the Probe 15 was manufactured by the Adams Brothers. It is believed that only one of these was ever made and it is still intact in Switzerland.

A subsequent model to the Probe 16, the Probe 2001 was also manufactured from 1970 to 1972 by the Probe Motor Company and WT Nugent (Engineering Ltd).

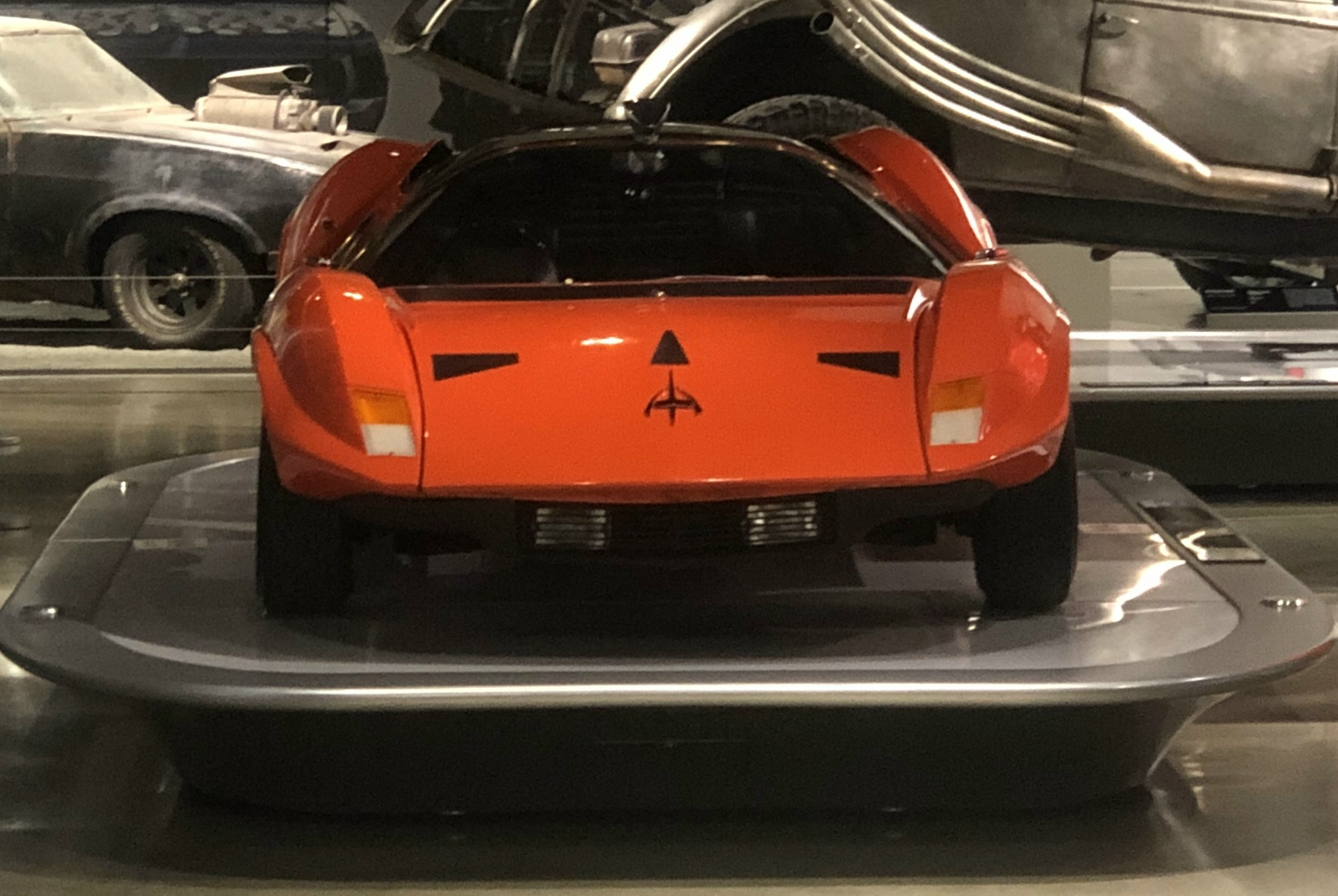
Adams Brothers Probe 16 chassis AB/3 on display at the Petersen Automotive Museum as part of their Hollywood Dream Machines: Vehicles of Science Fiction and Fantasy exhibit

== Chassis numbers ==
Chassis AB/2 was the first Probe 16 produced. Made for, and sold to Jim Webb, this car was painted Wedgewood Blue, and had a black interior. Out of the three cars produced, it was the only one that was configured for left-hand drive. The car was featured extensively and on the cover of the UK Telegraph Magazine in October 1969. In addition to being the only left-hand drive car produced, this chassis differs from the other two in the location of the gas tank fillers, the addition of stylized cut outs in the rear fender, and the use of different tail lamps in the rear. This car was shown at the Montreal Motor Show 1969-1970. Ownership history is murky following some periods of neglect, but the chassis is now located in the United Kingdom and is slated to be restored in the near future.

Chassis AB/3 was the second Probe 16 produced, and was originally manufactured for, and sold to rock musician Jack Bruce of the band Cream. This particular car was originally red, with a black interior and is distinguished by the large Adams Brothers badge located on the front of the car (the only one of the series with this badge installed). The car was displayed at the Earl's Court London Car Show of October 1969. Previous owners include drummer Corky Laing, professor Clyde Kwok, and Phillip Karam. Current ownership resides with Dempsey Motorsports and the car has been restored and is currently driving on the road as of May 2023.

Chassis AB/4 was the final Probe 16 produced, originally as a demonstration model for the Adams brothers. This car was originally silver with a red interior (although documentation from the Adams brothers indicates it was originally constructed with a black interior). This chassis was sold and ended up in the Pollock Auto Showcase collection / museum for many years before being offered for sale around 1985. Following the sale of the car, it was dismantled, painted yellow, and stored. In 2004, it was featured on season five of the UK show Top Gear as a candidate for their "restoration ripoff" contest. The contest was quietly cancelled some years later, and the car remained unrestored until a full restoration of the car was performed by UK specialists Club Autosport.

Chassis AB/1 was converted from a Probe 15, and chassis AB/5 was used for the Probe 2001.
