= Alfa Romeo Iguana =

Concept car designed by Italdesign

Alfa Romeo 33 Iguana
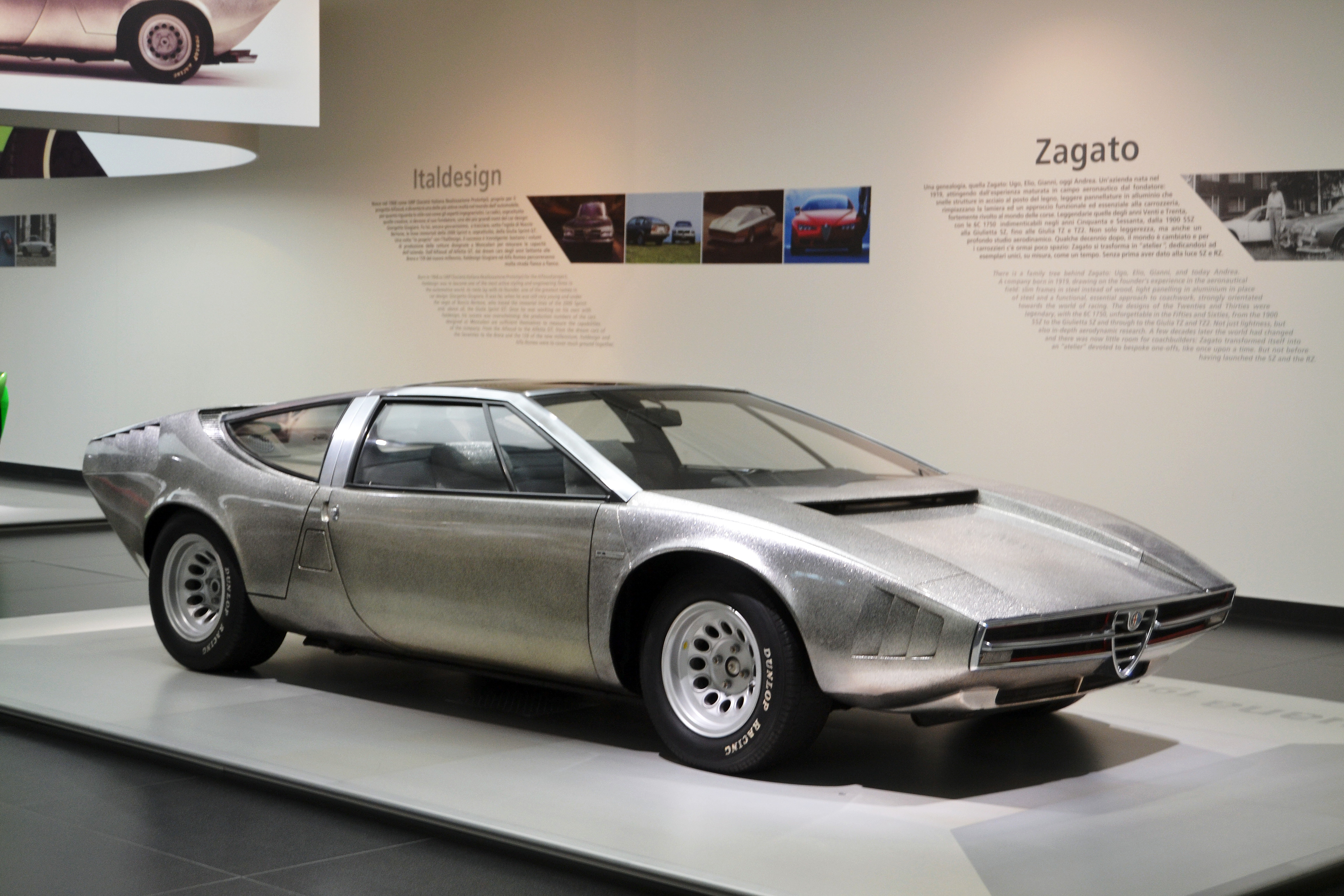

Overview
- Manufacturer: Alfa Romeo
- Production: 1969
- Assembly: Italy: Turin
- Designer: Giorgetto Giugiaro at Italdesign

Body and chassis
- Class: Concept car
- Body style: 2-door coupé
- Layout: Mid-engine, rear-wheel drive
- Related: Alfa Romeo 33 Stradale

Powertrain
- Engine: 1,995 cc (121.7 cu in) DOHC V8; 2,593 cc (158.2 cu in) DOHC V8
- Transmission: 6-speed manual

Dimensions
- Wheelbase: 2,350 mm (92.5 in)
- Length: 4,050 mm (159.4 in)
- Width: 1,780 mm (70.1 in)
- Height: 1,050 mm (41.3 in)
- Kerb weight: 700 kg (1,543.2 lb)

The Alfa Romeo Iguana is a concept car produced by Alfa Romeo in 1969. It was designed by Giorgetto Giugiaro at Italdesign.

== Background ==
The car was previewed at the Sport Car Show in Monza and presented officially at the Turin Auto Show in 1969. It was the first Alfa Romeo model designed by Giorgetto Giugiaro as head of his own carrozzeria, and was based on the Alfa Romeo 33 Stradale road-going version of the Tipo 33/2. Although it did not go into production, the Iguana is reflected in Giugiaro's later work. The body of the Iguana was painted a metal-flake grey, while the roof frame and cabin pillars were finished in brushed metal, a treatment Giugiaro later applied to the DMC DeLorean.

== Technical details ==
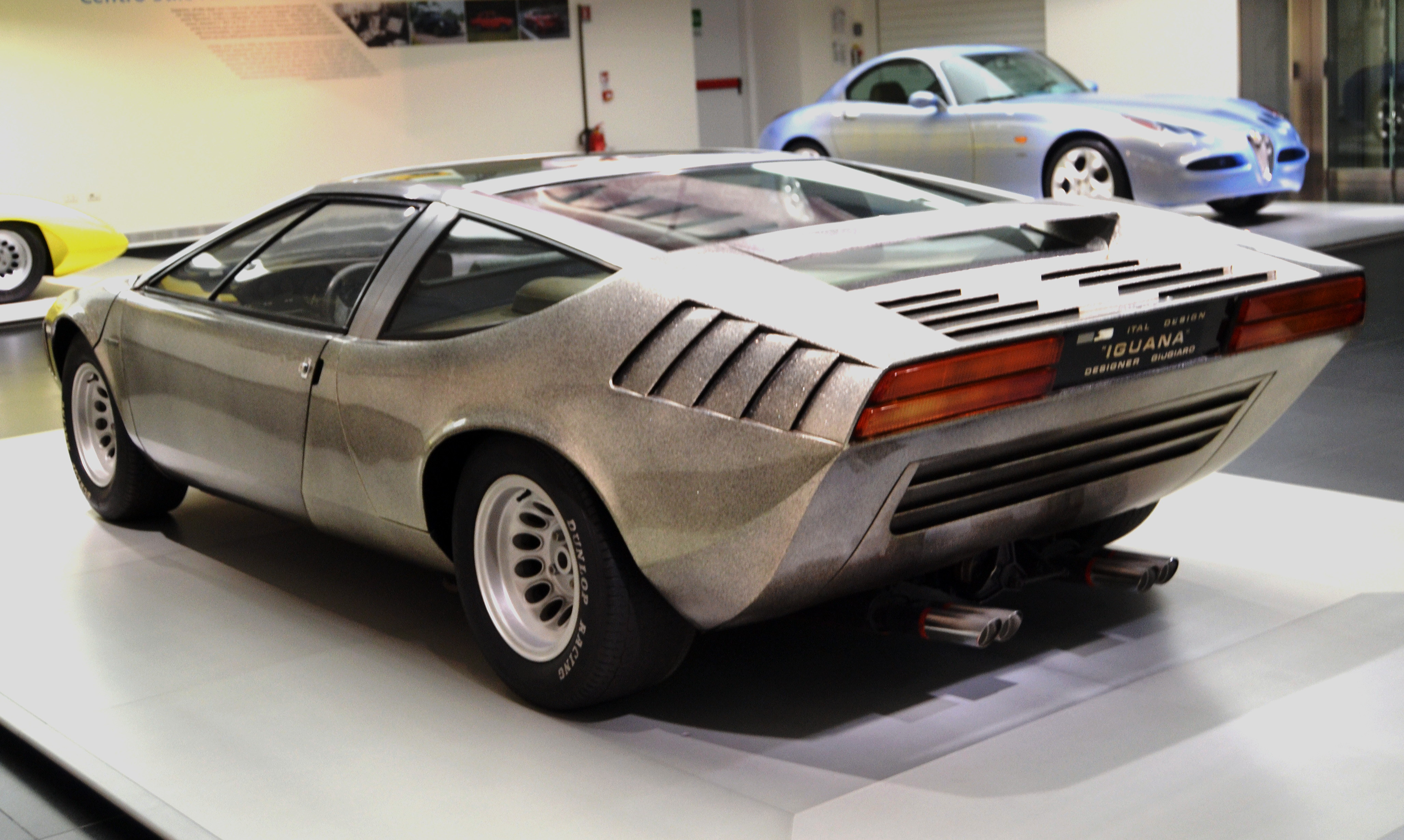
Rear view.

The chassis inherited from the Stradale was of tubular steel. The fuel tank was lined with rubber. The body was a coupé executed in fibreglass. The low sloping nose between raised sections over the wheels and depth of the windshield would be revisited on the Porsche Tapiro and Maserati Bora, while the definition of the rear elements will also appear in other cars styled by Giugiaro, notably the Alfetta GT.

The Iguana was initially equipped with a 1,995 cc (121.7 cu in) aluminium V8 engine delivering 171.5 kW (230 hp) of power at 8,000 rpm. The engine was capable of 199 kW (266.9 hp), but was detuned for reliability. This had been the first V8 engine produced by Alfa Romeo when it was introduced in the Tipo 33, and in the Iguana it was combined with a SPICA fuel injection system and a six-speed Colotti gearbox. Thus equipped the car was capable of a top speed of 260 km/h (161.6 mph). At some point, and for reasons unknown, the original engine was replaced with one of the 2,593 cc (158.2 cu in), 149.1 kW (200 hp) V8s built for the Montreal.

Suspension was upper and lower A-arms at all four corners. Brakes were Girling disks, and the wheels were Campagnolo alloys.

== Related vehicles ==
- Alfa Romeo Tipo 33
- Alfa Romeo 33 Stradale
- Alfa Romeo Carabo
- Alfa Romeo 33/2 Coupé Speciale
- Alfa Romeo 33 Cuneo
- Alfa Romeo Navajo
