= Alfa Romeo 33 Stradale =

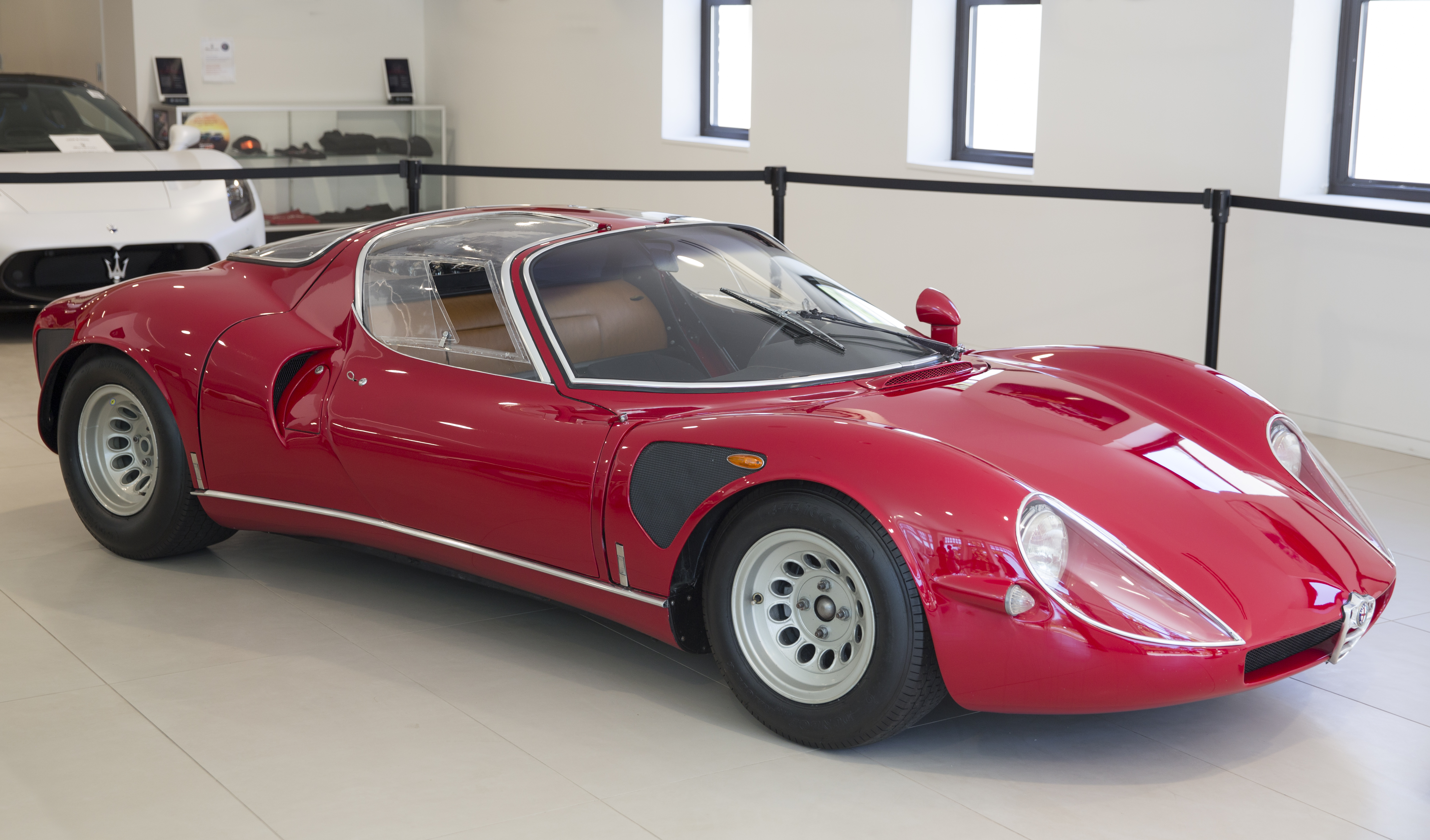

Overview
- Manufacturer: Alfa Romeo
- Production: November 1967 – March 1969; 18 produced
- Assembly: Italy: Milan (Carrozzeria Marazzi)
- Designer: Franco Scaglione

Body and chassis
- Class: Sports car (S)
- Body style: 2-door coupé
- Layout: Rear mid-engine, rear-wheel drive
- Doors: Butterfly
- Related: Alfa Romeo Tipo 33

Powertrain
- Engine: 2.0 L Tipo 33/2 V8
- Transmission: 6-speed Colotti manual

Dimensions
- Wheelbase: 2,350 mm (92.5 in)
- Length: 3,970 mm (156.3 in)
- Width: 1,710 mm (67.3 in)
- Height: 991 mm (39.0 in)
- Curb weight: 700 kg (1,543 lb)

Chronology
- Successor: Alfa Romeo 33 Stradale (2023) (spiritual)

The Alfa Romeo 33 Stradale is a mid-engine sports car built by Italian automobile manufacturer Alfa Romeo. It was the fastest commercially available car for the standing kilometer upon its introduction. 18 examples were produced between 1967 and 1969. "Stradale" (Italian for "road-going") is a term often used by Italian car manufacturers to indicate a street-legal version of a racing car; indeed the 33 Stradale was derived from the Tipo 33 sports prototype. Built in an attempt by Alfa Romeo to make some of its racing technology available to the public, it was also the most expensive automobile for sale to the public in 1968 at US$17,000 (equivalent to $157,400 in 2025).

== Background ==
Sportscar racing from 1966 onwards was divided into Group 6 "prototypes" with hardly any limitations until maximum engine size was reduced to 3 liter after 1967. If at least 50 cars were built within 12 months, they could be homologated as Group 4 "sports cars", like the already existing Ford GT40 Mk.I and Ferrari 250 LM from the GT era. Homologation requirements were carrying a spare wheel, space for luggage, ignition lock, lights, wipers and other things not found in pure racers but in potentially street legal cars. Already in early 1966, Porsche succeeded in making, selling, and homologating over 50 Porsche 906 Carrera 6 for the 2 liter class. Customers could compete with it as sports car for class wins, while the factory raced improved prototypes and developed it into the Porsche 910. On the other hand, in the same 1966/67 time frame, Ferrari failed to make enough of its 2 liter V6 Dino 206 S, having to race it as prototype. Anyway, in addition to the 33 as prototype racers, Alfa in September 1967 announced that a batch of 50 new Group 4 cars would be constructed, the Stradale. Like Ferrari with the 206S, Alfa did not achieve the required number for homologation despite the number being lowered to 25 in 1969, while many Dino 206 GT and 246 GT were built by Ferrari as road cars, and a series of 25 Ferrari 512S in 1970.

== History ==
The 33 Stradale was based on the Autodelta Alfa Romeo Tipo 33 racing car. The car, designed by Franco Scaglione, and built by Carrozzeria Marazzi, made its debut at the Paris Salon de L'Auto on 5 October 1967.

The first prototype (chassis no. 10533.01) was built at Autodelta's workshop in Settimo Milanese, side by side with the Tipo 33 "Periscopica" race car in 1967. The body was built by Franco Scaglione and his team from Carrozzeria Marazzi, while Autodelta worked on the technical aspects of the car. Work to manufacture another magnesium bodied prototype (chassis no. 10533.12) (intended for street racing) was started by Scaglione. However, Marazzi did not finish this until 1968. The two prototypes are the only ones to have the dual headlight arrangement. This was redesigned by Scaglione on the production cars due to regulations on minimum headlight distance from the ground.

The two prototypes carry the project's original serial numbers, 105.33.xx. However, the Tipo 33 racing and production cars got 750.33.0xx (racing) and 750.33.1xx (Stradale) chassis numbers. Marazzi claims to have built 18 chassis. 5 of them were used for 6 concept cars (one chassis was used twice) by Pininfarina, Bertone and Giugiaro/Italdesign and 8 were used for production cars. The rest of the chassis numbers are not confirmed due to a lack of available information as the exact number (allegedly 18) of actual Stradale-chassis (with a 10 cm longer wheelbase than the race cars) doesn't quite match the range of chassis numbers.

The production version of the 33 Stradale was introduced at the Sport Car Show in Monza, Italy in September 1967. The prototype (chassis No. 105.33.01) was sold to the Gallery Abarth in Japan. The second magnesium bodied Stradale prototype (chassis No. 105.33.12) and the five concept cars are now part of the Alfa Romeo Museum.

== Specifications ==
=== Body and chassis ===
The 33 Stradale is considered the first road-going production vehicle to feature forward- and upward-opening butterfly doors, hinged both at the base and on top of the windshield-frame, allowing the 33 Stradale to also feature side windows which seamlessly curve upward into the roof/canopy of its body. Most cars feature an aluminium body on an aluminium tubular chassis. As a result of being built by hand, each model differs from the others in some details. For example, the position of the windscreen wiper, and some of the later cars having vents added behind both the front and rear wheels to allow hot air from the brakes to escape is a differentiating factor. The car has 13 inches (33 cm) Campagnolo magnesium-alloy wheels – the front and the rear wheels are 8 and 9 inches (20 and 23 cm) wide respectively; the brakes used are disc brakes manufactured by Girling, the rear ones are inboard. The suspension system of the car is directly derived from the Tipo 33 race car, with upper and lower control arms in the front and double trailing arms in the rear, along with substantial anti-roll bars.

Technical specifications
Type	90° DOHC V8
Displacement	1,995 cc (2.0 L; 121.7 cu in)
Bore x stroke	78mm x 52.2mm
Power	230 PS (227 hp; 169 kW) at 8,800 rpm
Torque	206 N⋅m (152 lb⋅ft) at 7,000 rpm
Top speed	260 km/h (162 mph)
0–100 km/h (62 mph)	less than 6 seconds (untested)

=== Engine and transmission ===
The race-bred engine bore no resemblance to the mass-produced units in Alfa Romeo's more mainstream vehicles. The engine is closely related to the V8 of the Montreal, albeit with a smaller displacement and a higher power output. The engines, despite being derived from the Tipo 33 racer cars, differed in many details. For example, the 33 Stradale's engines had chain driven camshafts as opposed to the racers' gear driven ones, but the Stradale kept the racing engine's flat plane crankshaft, whereas the Montreal engine had a crossplane crank. Race engineer Carlo Chiti had designed an oversquare bore x stroke of 78 mm × 52.2 mm (3.07 in × 2.06 in) while the all-aluminum 1,995 cc (2.0 L) V8 engine was dry-sump lubricated featuring SPICA fuel injection with four ignition coils and twin spark plugs per cylinder. The engine used four chain-driven camshafts to operate the 2 valves per cylinder valvetrain featuring dual overhead camshafts and had a rev-limit of 10,000 rpm with a compression ratio of 10.5:1 The engine has a maximum power output of 230 PS (227 hp; 169 kW) at 8,800 rpm and 206 N⋅m (152 lb⋅ft) at 7,000 rpm of torque in road trim and 270 PS (266 hp; 199 kW) in race trim. Due to the hand-built nature of the drivetrain, the power output levels can vary by each car produced, for example the first production Stradale (No. 750.33.101) has a factory datasheet that states a power output of 243 PS (240 hp; 179 kW) at 9,400 rpm with a "street" exhaust and 254 PS (251 hp; 187 kW) with open exhaust. The transmission is a 6-speed unit similar to the Tipo 33 race car, designed by Colotti Trasmissioni.

Although the Stradale is a road legal car, it has some limitations which may make the everyday use slightly hard, for example missing locks and limited ground clearance.

=== Performance ===
The car takes less than six seconds to attain 100 km/h (62 mph) from a standing start and has a claimed top speed of 260 km/h (160 mph). In 1968, the German Auto, Motor und Sport magazine measured a top speed of 252 km/h (156.6 mph) and 24.0 seconds for the standing kilometer which made it the fastest commercially available car for this distance at the time. It achieved this using an engine less than half the displacement of those in high-performance contemporary sports cars such as the Lamborghini Miura, Ferrari Daytona, and Maserati Ghibli.

=== Gallery ===
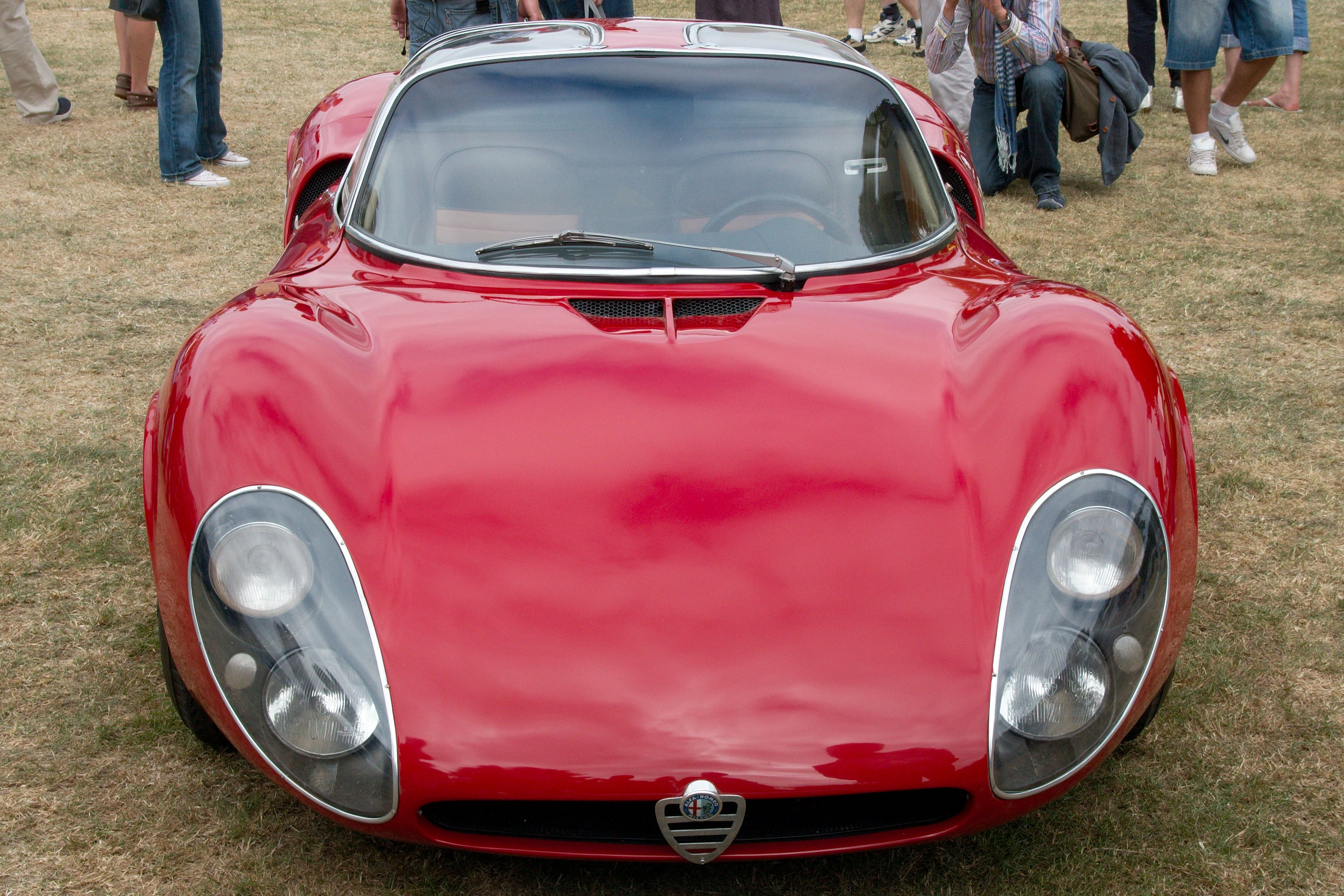
Prototype with twin headlights.
(Alfa Romeo Museum replica)

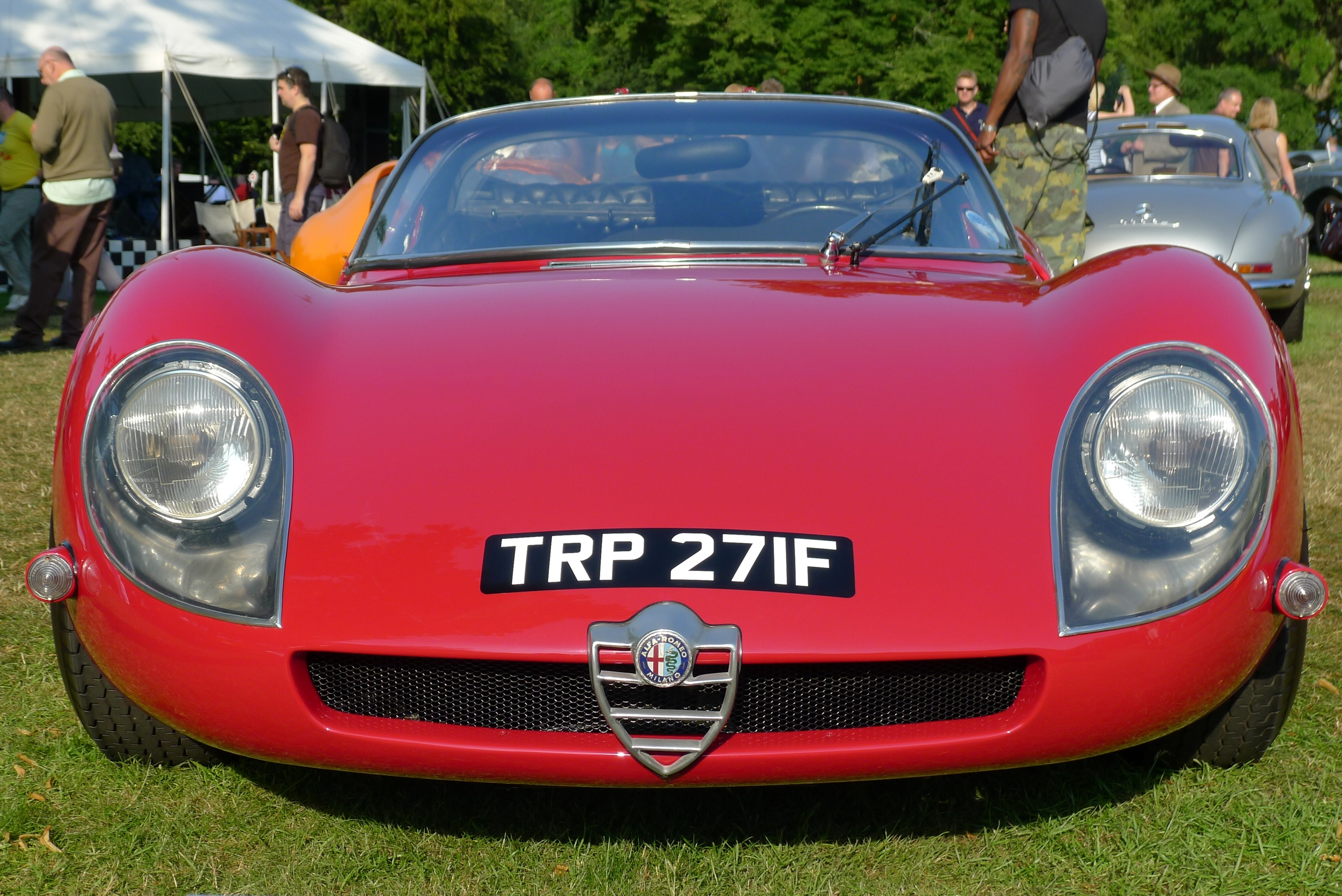
Production version with single headlights.

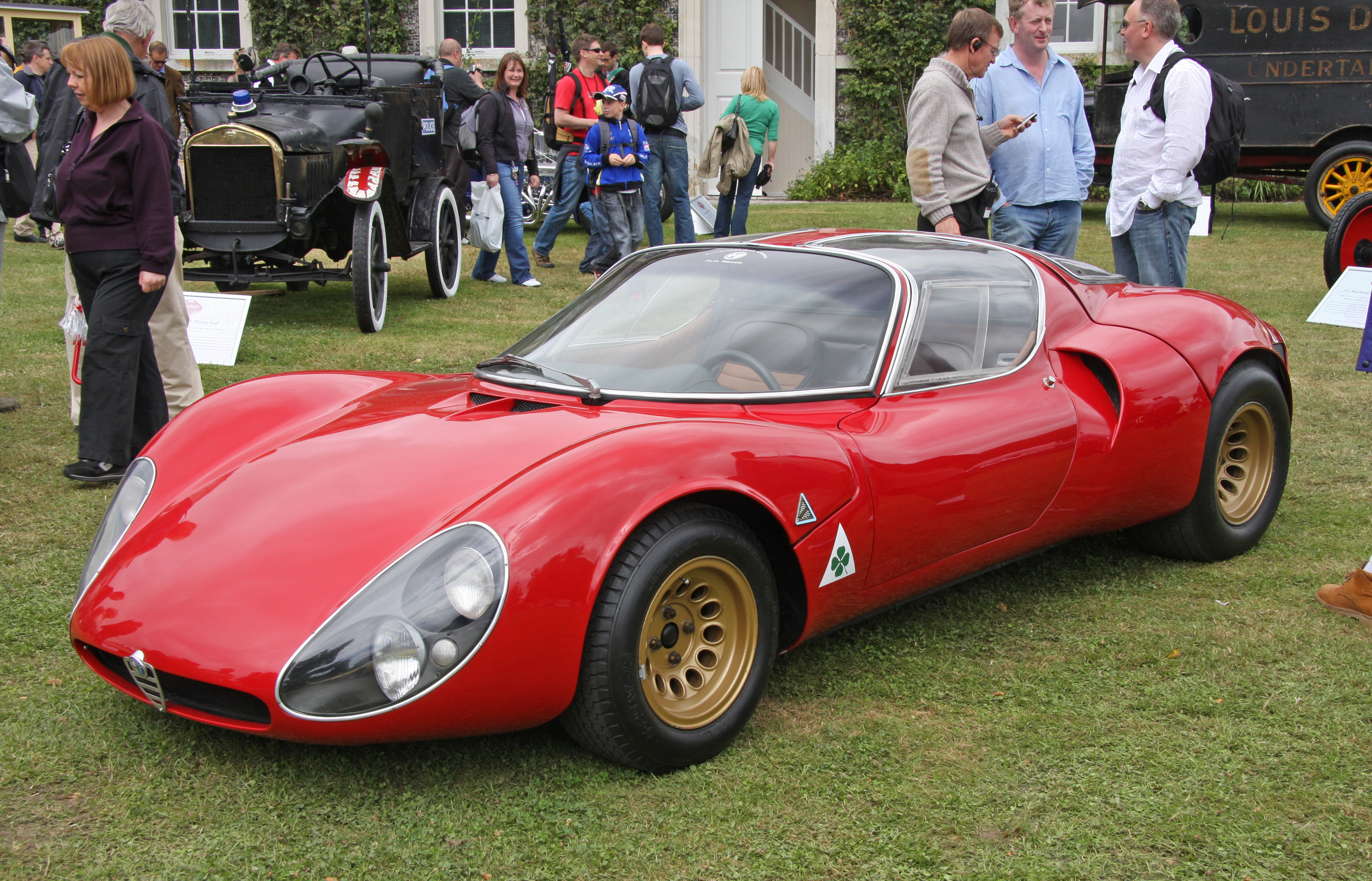
Prototype's side profile.
(Alfa Romeo museum replica).

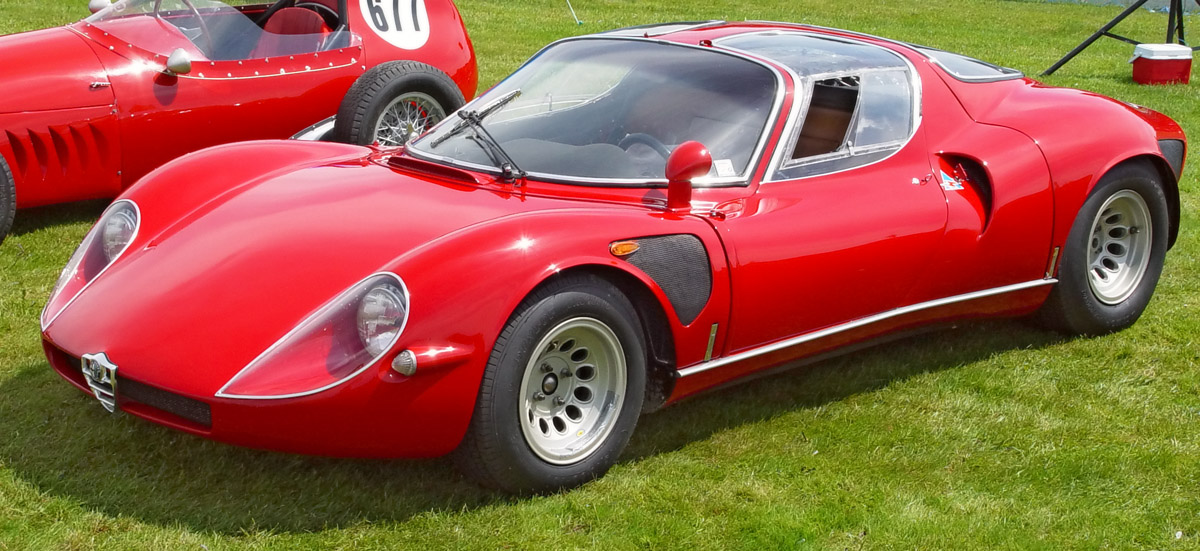
Later production version with side vents adjacent to both the front and rear wheels.

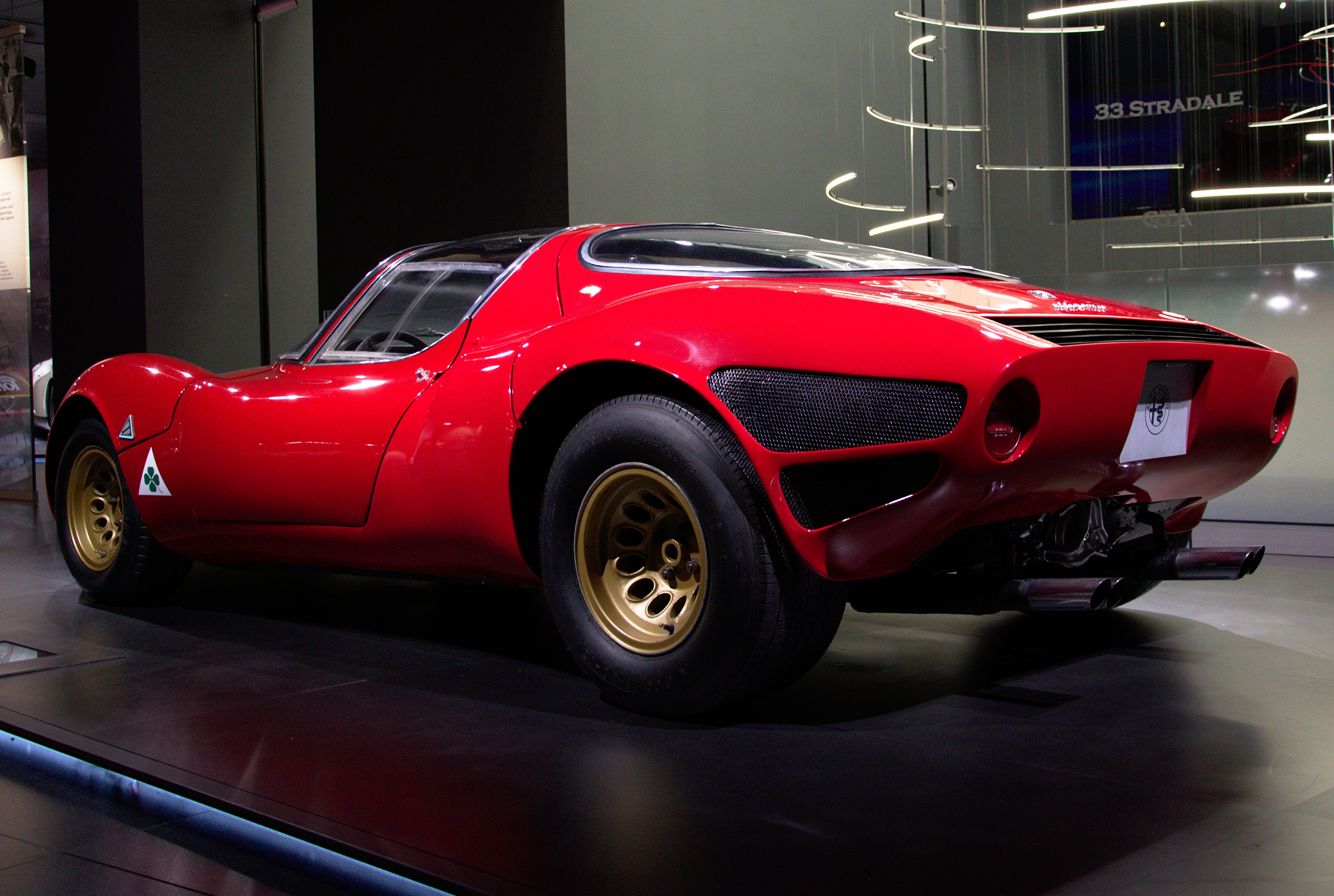
Rear three-quarter view of the prototype showcased in the Alfa Romeo Museum.

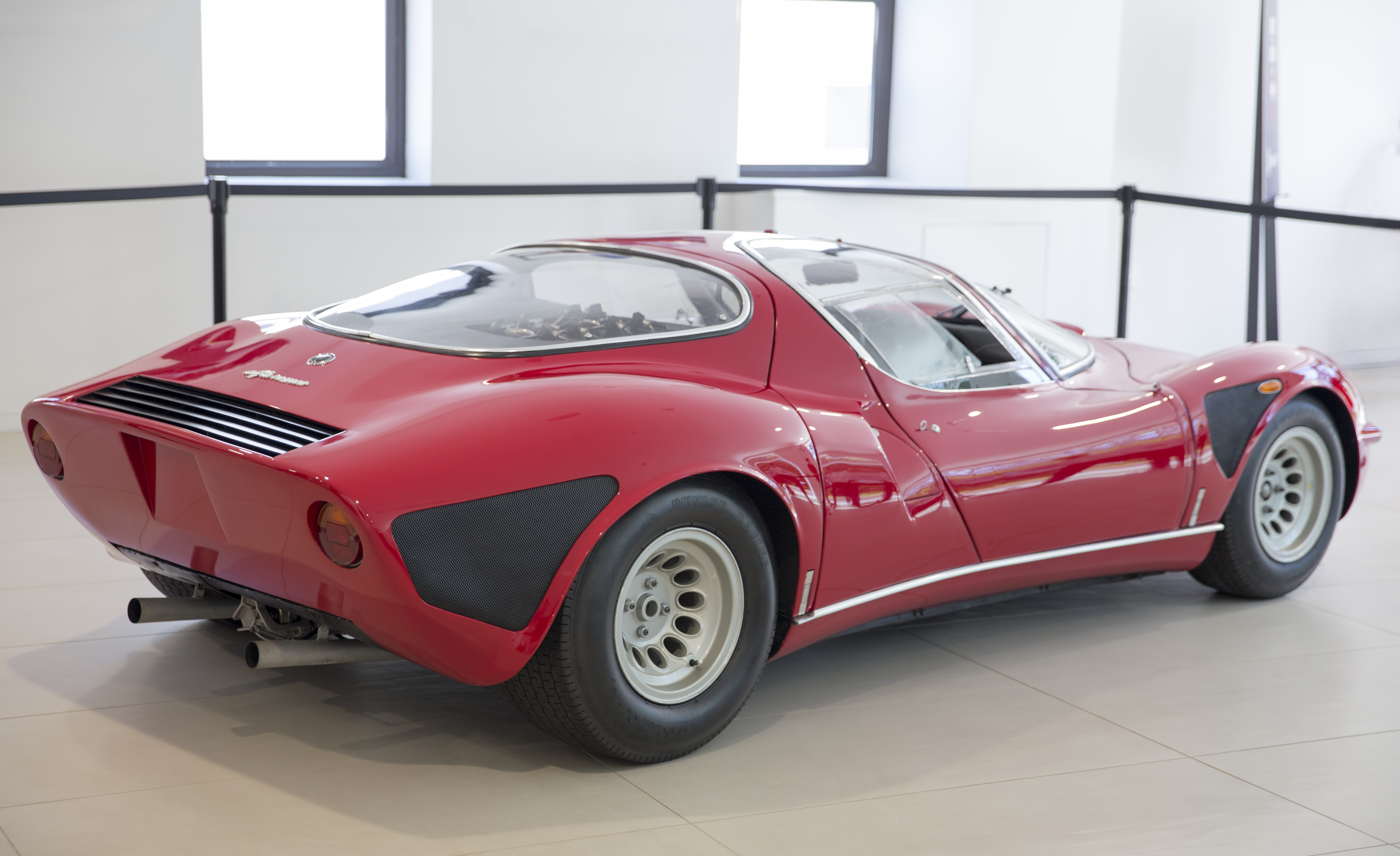
Rear three-quarter view of a 33 Stradale.

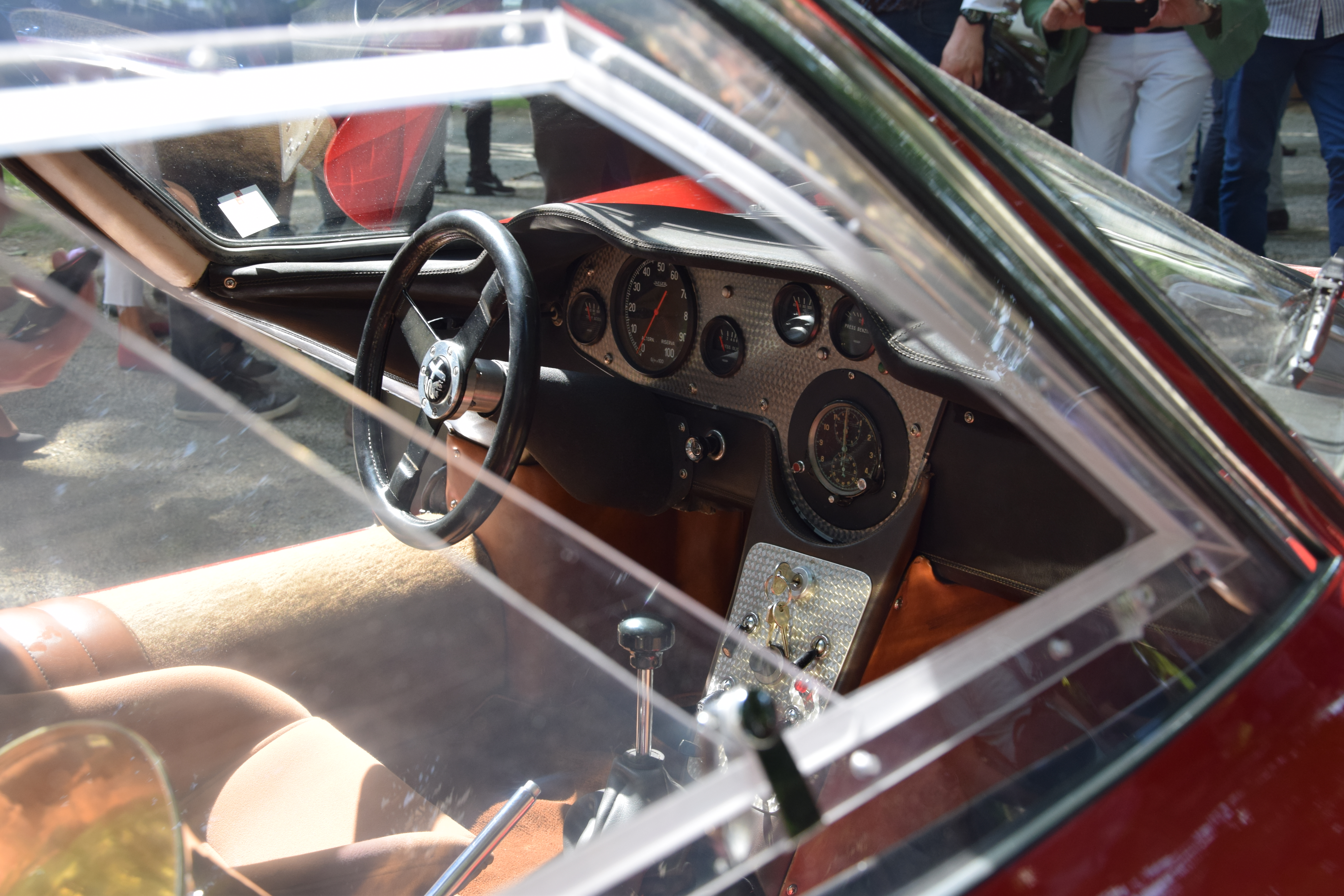
Interior.

== Concept cars ==
Six concept cars were built on 33 Stradale chassis with bodies designed by various Italian coachbuilders.

Name	Designer	Debut	Dimensions	Chassis no.
Alfa Romeo Carabo	Marcello Gandini at Bertone	1968 Paris Motor Show		750.33.109
Alfa Romeo P33 Roadster (Note: later rebodied by Pininfarina into the Cuneo)	Paolo Martin at Pininfarina	1968 Turin Auto Show		750.33.108
Alfa Romeo Iguana	Giorgetto Giugiaro at Italdesign	1969 Turin Auto Show		750.33.116
Alfa Romeo 33/2 Coupé Speciale	Leonardo Fioravanti at Pininfarina	1969 Paris Motor Show	wheelbase: 2,350 mm (92.5 in)	750.33.115
Alfa Romeo 33/2 Coupé Speciale	Leonardo Fioravanti at Pininfarina	1969 Paris Motor Show	length x width: 4,000 mm × 1,800 mm (157.5 in × 70.9 in)	750.33.115
Alfa Romeo 33/2 Coupé Speciale	Leonardo Fioravanti at Pininfarina	1969 Paris Motor Show	height: n/a	750.33.115
Alfa Romeo 33/2 Coupé Speciale	Leonardo Fioravanti at Pininfarina	1969 Paris Motor Show	weight: 720 kg (1,587 lb)	750.33.115
Alfa Romeo P33 Cuneo	Paolo Martin at Pininfarina	1971 Brussels Motor Show		750.33.108
Alfa Romeo 33 Navajo	Marcello Gandini at Bertone	1976 Geneva Motor Show	wheelbase: 2,430 mm (95.7 in)	750.33.117
Alfa Romeo 33 Navajo	Marcello Gandini at Bertone	1976 Geneva Motor Show	length x width: 3,800 mm × 1,860 mm (149.6 in × 73.2 in)	750.33.117
Alfa Romeo 33 Navajo	Marcello Gandini at Bertone	1976 Geneva Motor Show	height: 1,050 mm (41.3 in)	750.33.117
Alfa Romeo 33 Navajo	Marcello Gandini at Bertone	1976 Geneva Motor Show	weight: 870 kg (1,918 lb)	750.33.117

=== Bertone ===
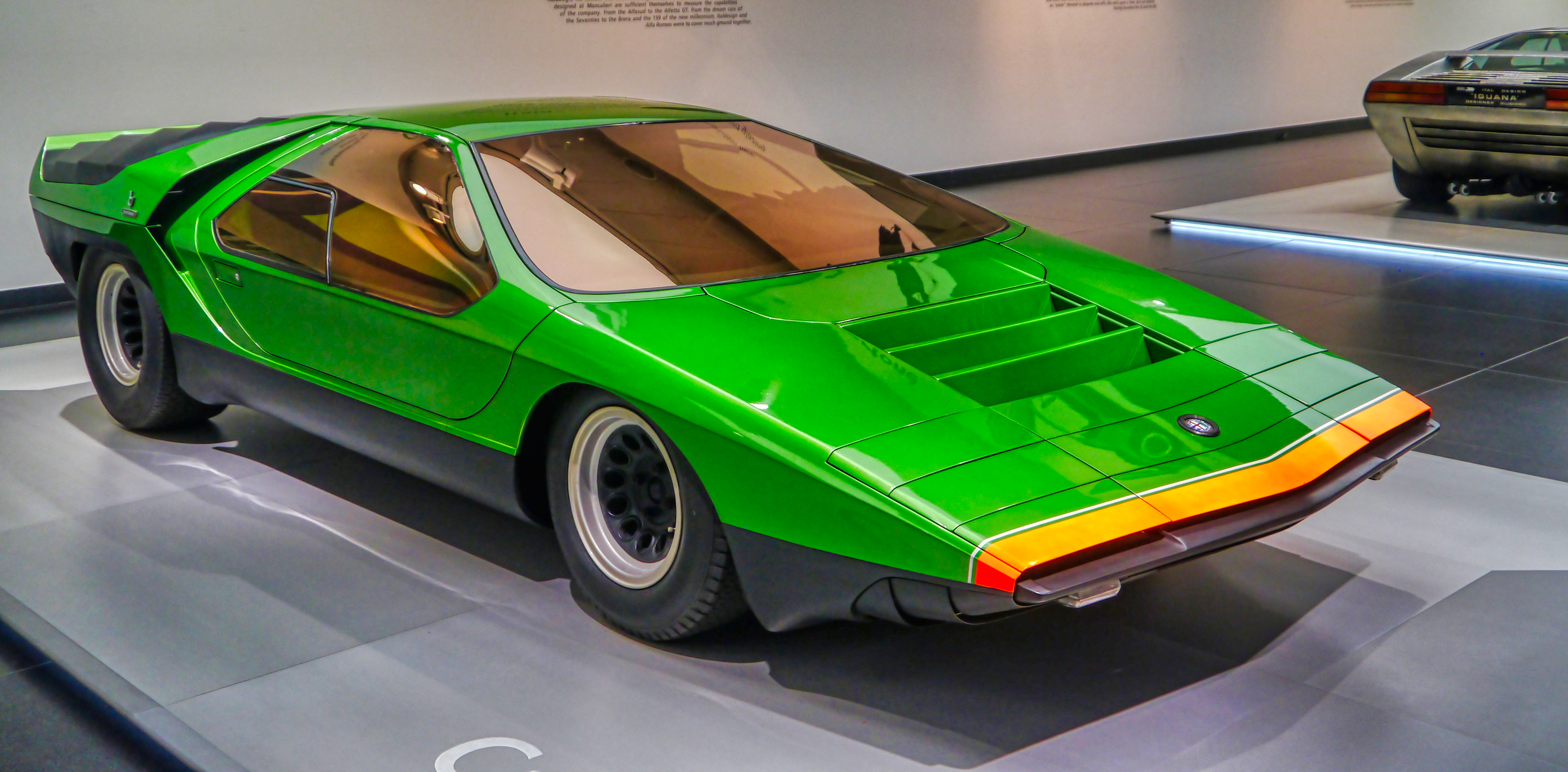
The Alfa Romeo Carabo displayed at the Arese Museo Storico

==== Alfa Romeo Carabo ====
The Carabo is a wedge-shaped coupé with scissor doors and was unveiled in 1968 at the Paris Motor Show. It was designed by Marcello Gandini working under Bertone, who had already built his reputation by designing the Lamborghini Miura.

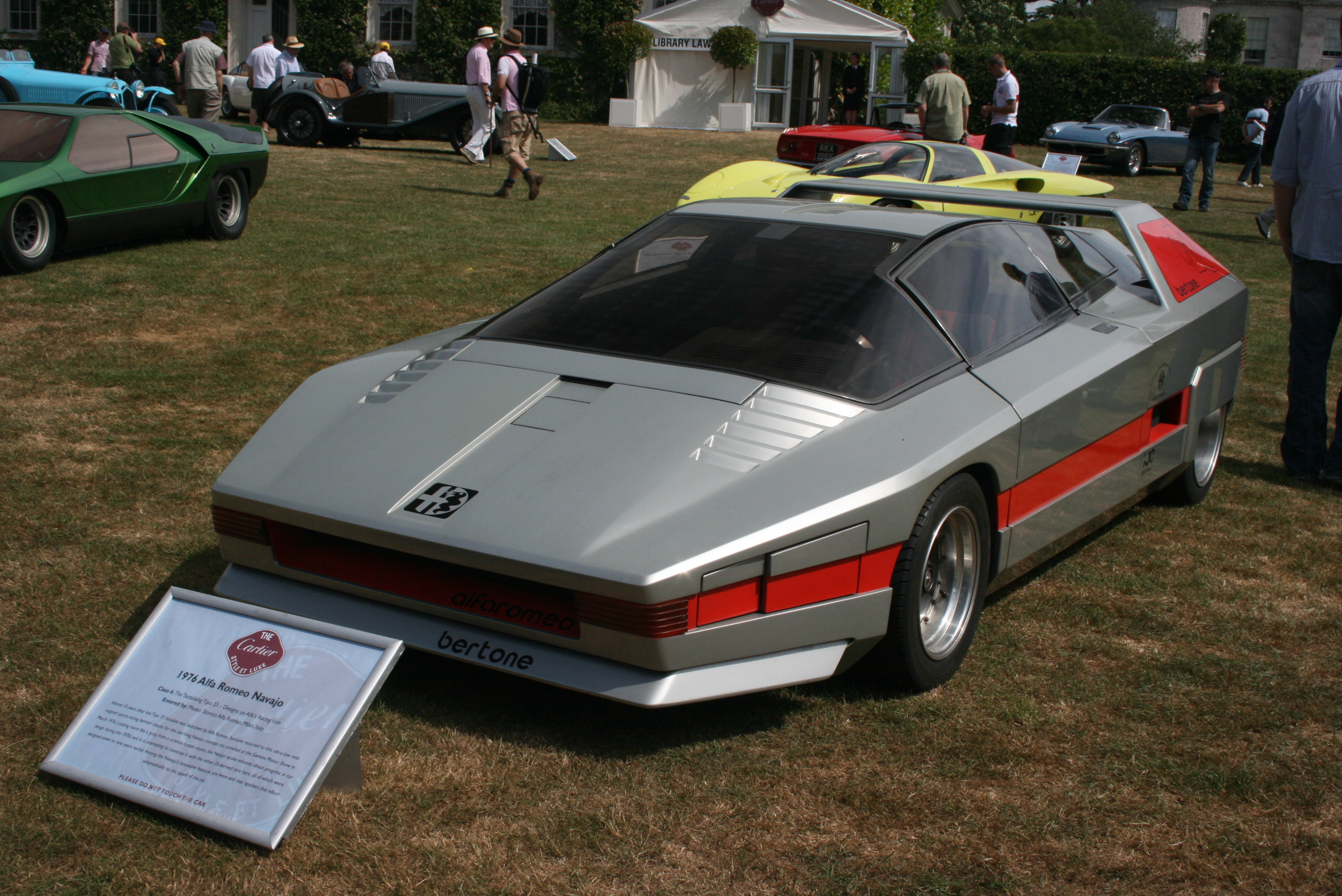
Alfa Romeo Navajo

==== Alfa Romeo Navajo ====
The Alfa Romeo Navajo concept car was unveiled at the 1976 Geneva Motor Show held in March of that year. It was given a full fibreglass coupé body with a wedge design, typical of the 1970s, and features such as active front and rear spoilers, as well as headlights which extend horizontally from the fenders. The car is equipped with the 2-litre fuel injected (SPICA) V8 engine producing around 230 PS (169 kW; 227 hp) at 8,800 rpm.

=== Pininfarina ===
Between 1968 and 1971, Italian design house Pininfarina designed a total of three vehicles on 33 Stradale chassis:

==== Alfa Romeo P33 Roadster ====
The Alfa Romeo P33 Roadster was presented to the public at the Turin Motor Show in November 1968. It was an open-top vehicle with a lower windscreen and a roll bar at rear painted in the colour of the body of the car. The chassis was re-bodied two years later to produce the Cuneo.

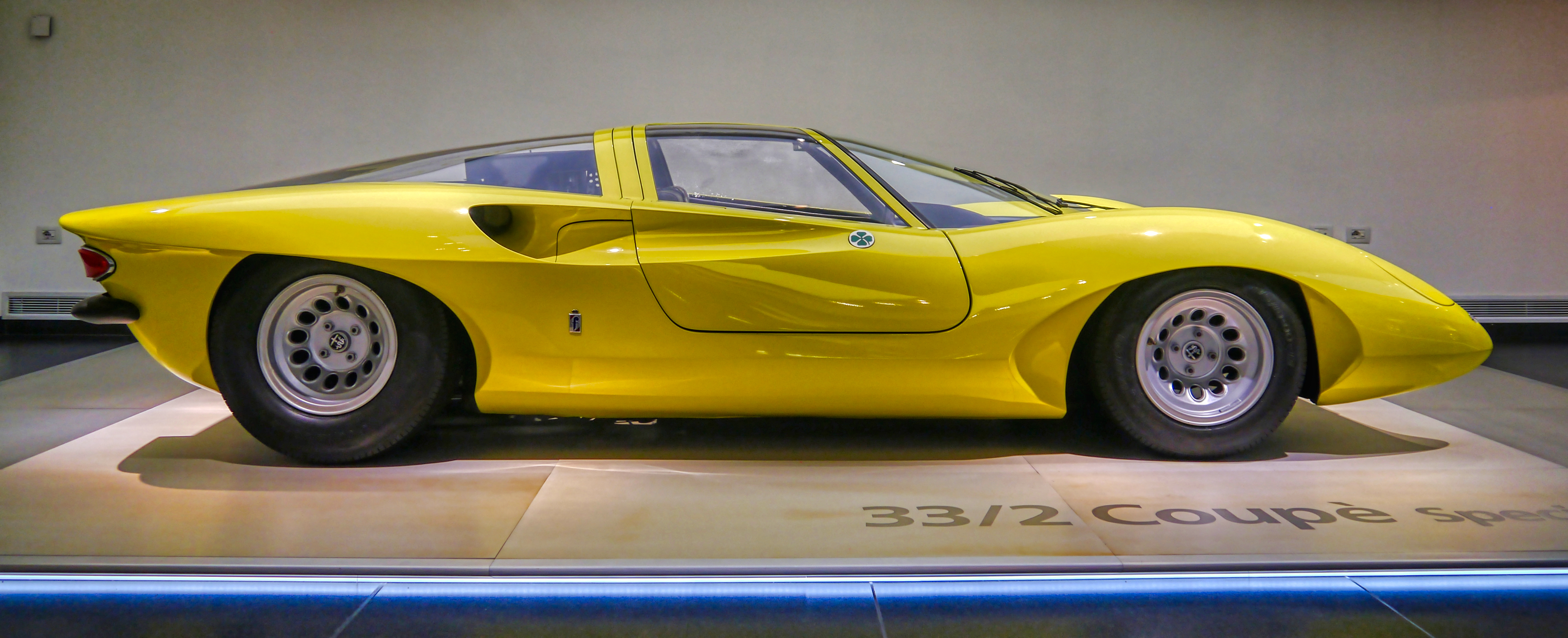
The 33/2 Coupé Speciale at the Alfa Romeo Museum

==== Alfa Romeo 33/2 Coupé Speciale ====
The Alfa Romeo 33/2 Coupé Speciale, also known as Alfa Romeo 33.2, was first presented to the public at the Paris Motor Show in 1969. This 2-door coupé was designed by Leonardo Fioravanti, then working at Pininfarina. It bears a striking yellow paint scheme and featured hydraulically operated butterfly doors and pop-up headlights. The design was influenced by the Ferrari 250 P5 concept shown a year earlier at Geneva.

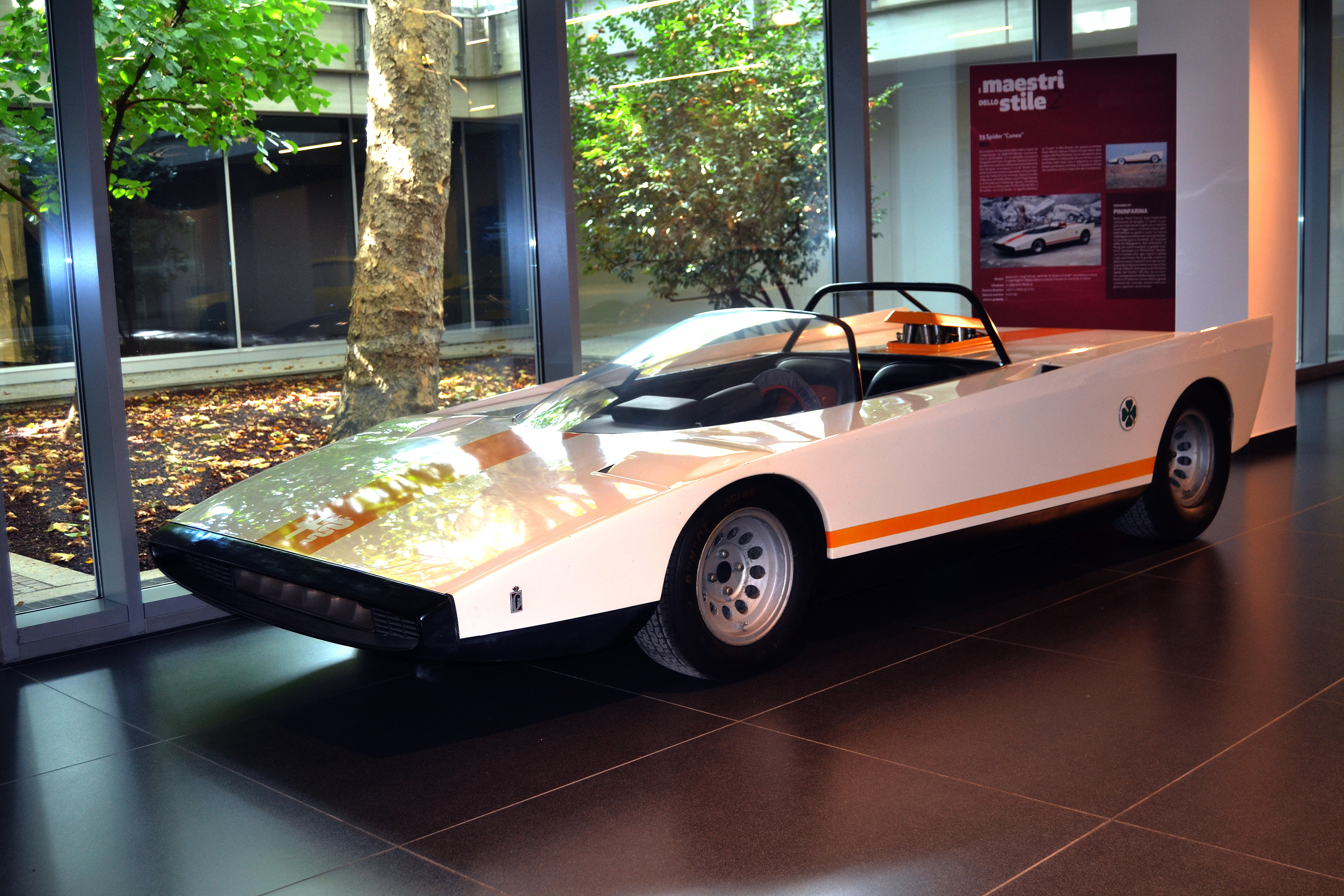
Alfa Romeo Cuneo

==== Alfa Romeo P33 Cuneo ====
The Alfa Romeo Cuneo, originally called 33 Spider at Pininfarina, was by designed by Paolo Martin. It is an open-top, wedge-shaped concept and was presented at the Brussels Motor Show in January 1971.

=== Italdesign ===
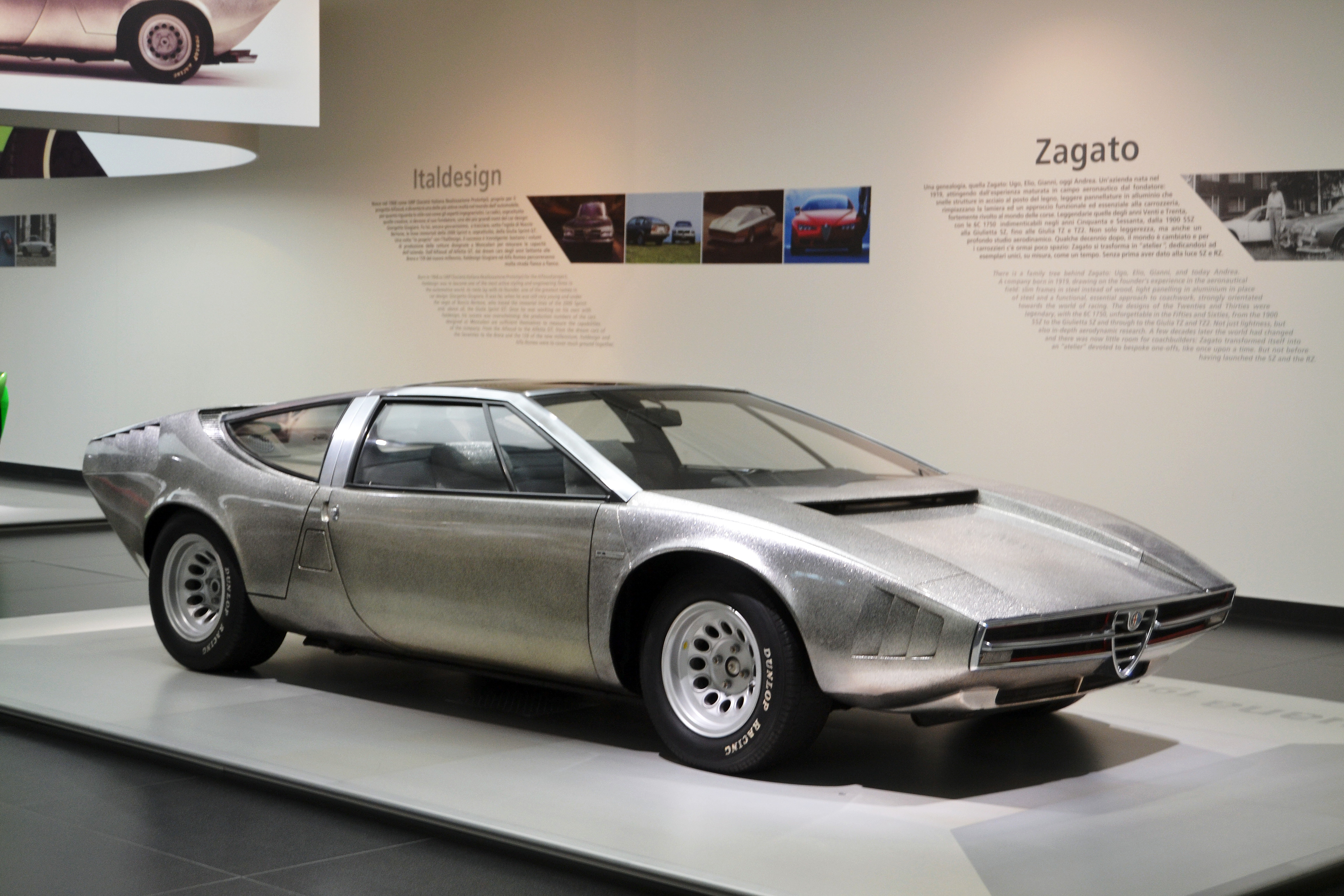
Alfa Romeo Iguana

==== Alfa Romeo Iguana ====
The Alfa Romeo Iguana, designed by Italdesign Giugiaro, was presented at the Turin Motor Show in November 1969. It is a two-seater sports coupé built on chassis No. 750.33.116. The design showed some new elements that Giugiaro introduced later in production vehicle designs. The body of the Iguana was painted a metal-flake grey, while the roof frame and cabin pillars were finished in brushed metal, a treatment Giugiaro later applied to the DMC DeLorean. The front end of the Iguana inspired the designs for the Maserati Bora and Merak, and the rear of the car with its high-mounted tail lights formed the basis of the design of the Alfa Romeo Alfasud Sprint. Allegedly, a small series production of the Iguana was planned, but it never materialized.

== In popular culture ==
A 33 Stradale can be seen in the 1969 Italian movie Un bellissimo novembre.

== See also ==
- Alfa Romeo 33 Stradale (2023)
- Alfa Romeo Montreal
- Ferrari Dino
- Lancia Stratos
