= Alfa Romeo Carabo =

Concept car designed by Bertone

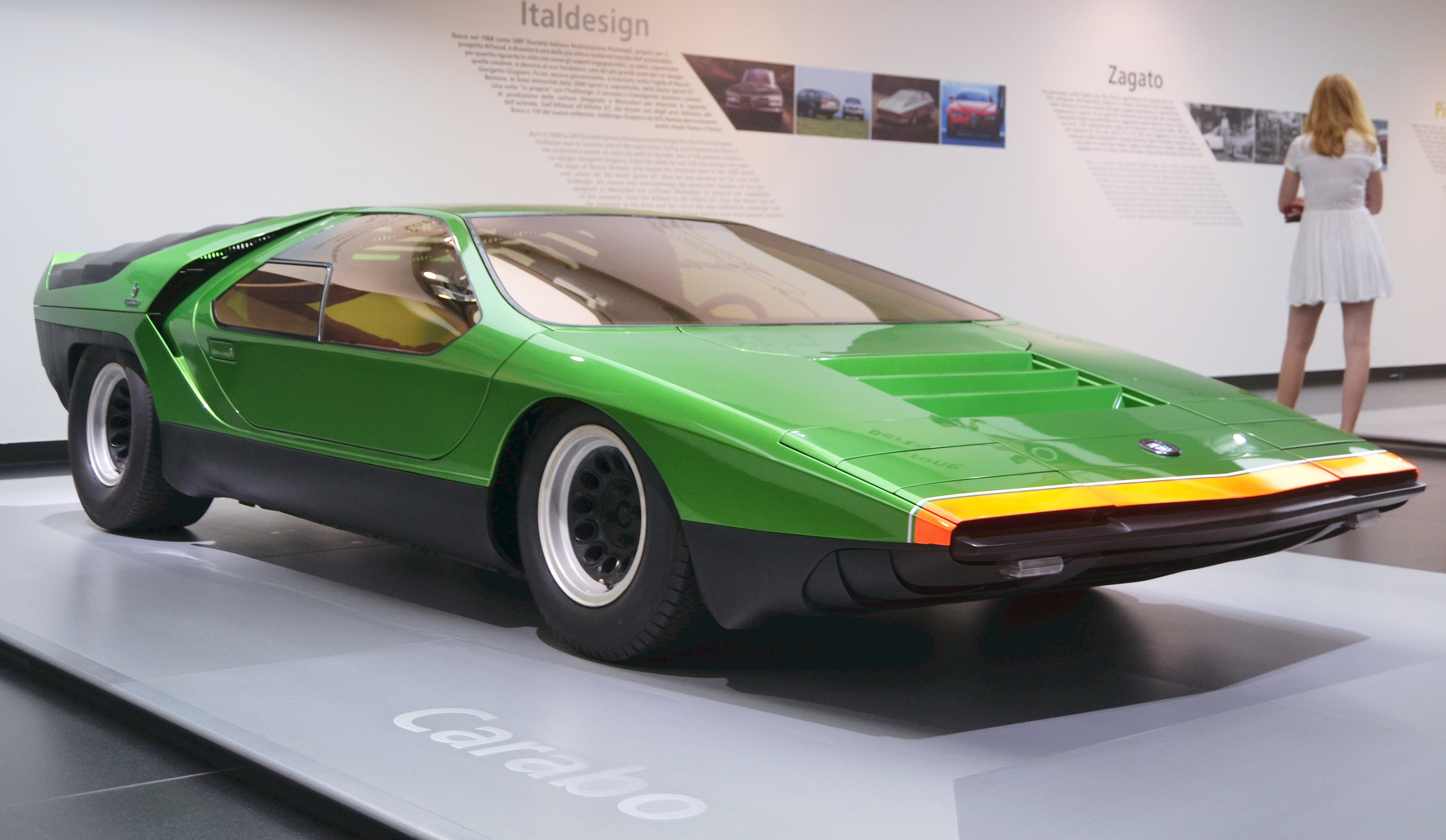

Overview
- Manufacturer: Gruppo Bertone
- Production: 1968
- Designer: Marcello Gandini at Bertone

Body and chassis
- Class: Concept car
- Body style: 2-door coupe
- Layout: RMR layout
- Doors: Scissor
- Related: Alfa Romeo 33 Stradale; Alfa Romeo 33.2; Alfa Romeo Iguana; Alfa Romeo Navajo

Powertrain
- Engine: 2.0 L (1995 cc) Tipo 33/2 V8
- Transmission: 6-speed Colotti manual

Dimensions
- Wheelbase: 2,350 mm (92.5 in)
- Length: 4,170 mm (164.2 in)
- Width: 1,780 mm (70.1 in)
- Height: 990 mm (39.0 in)
- Curb weight: 700 kg (1,543 lb)

The Alfa Romeo Carabo is a concept car first shown at the 1968 Paris Motor Show. It was designed by Marcello Gandini, working for the Bertone design studio. The Carabo name is derived from the Carabidae beetles, as evoked by the car's iridescent green and orange coloring.

The Carabo was created by Bertone in just 10 weeks and featured fiberglass bodywork. It was never intended for production but was fully functional and showcased unique features such as its scissor doors, being the first known vehicle to feature them. The Carabo was one of the first "wedge" shaped designs by Gandini, who would later go on to design cars such as the Lamborghini Countach, and helped set the trend of wedge shaped supercars and concept cars in the 1970s.

The prototype was built on the chassis of an Alfa Romeo 33 Stradale (chassis No. 750.33.109.), which features a mid-mounted 2.0 L V8 engine mated to a 6-speed Colotti manual transmission. The Carabo engine made 230 bhp (172 kW; 233 PS) at 8,800 rpm and 200 N⋅m (148 lbf⋅ft) of torque at 7,000 rpm. This allowed it to be able to reach a top speed of 250 km/h (155 mph).

== Gallery ==
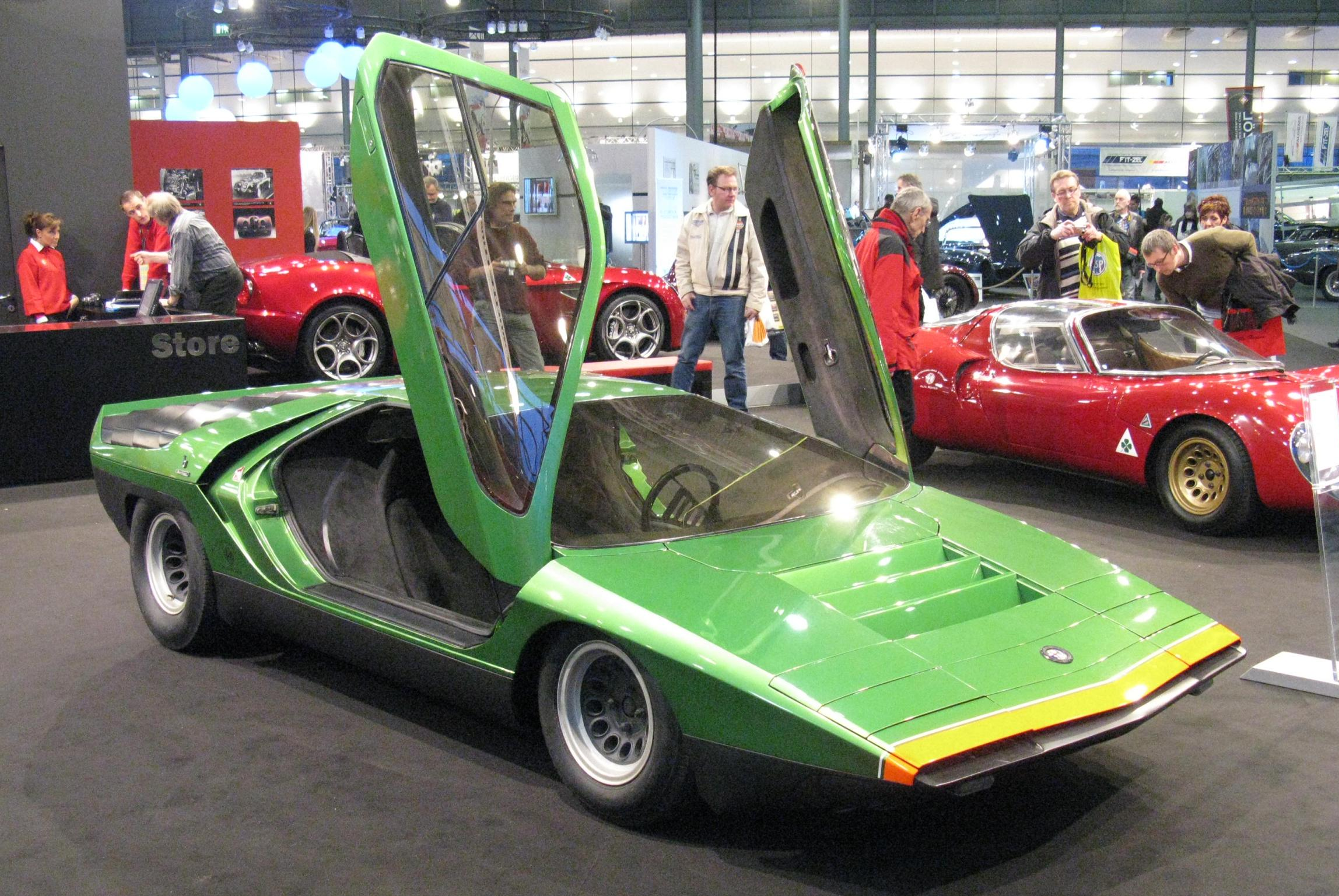
Carabo with doors open

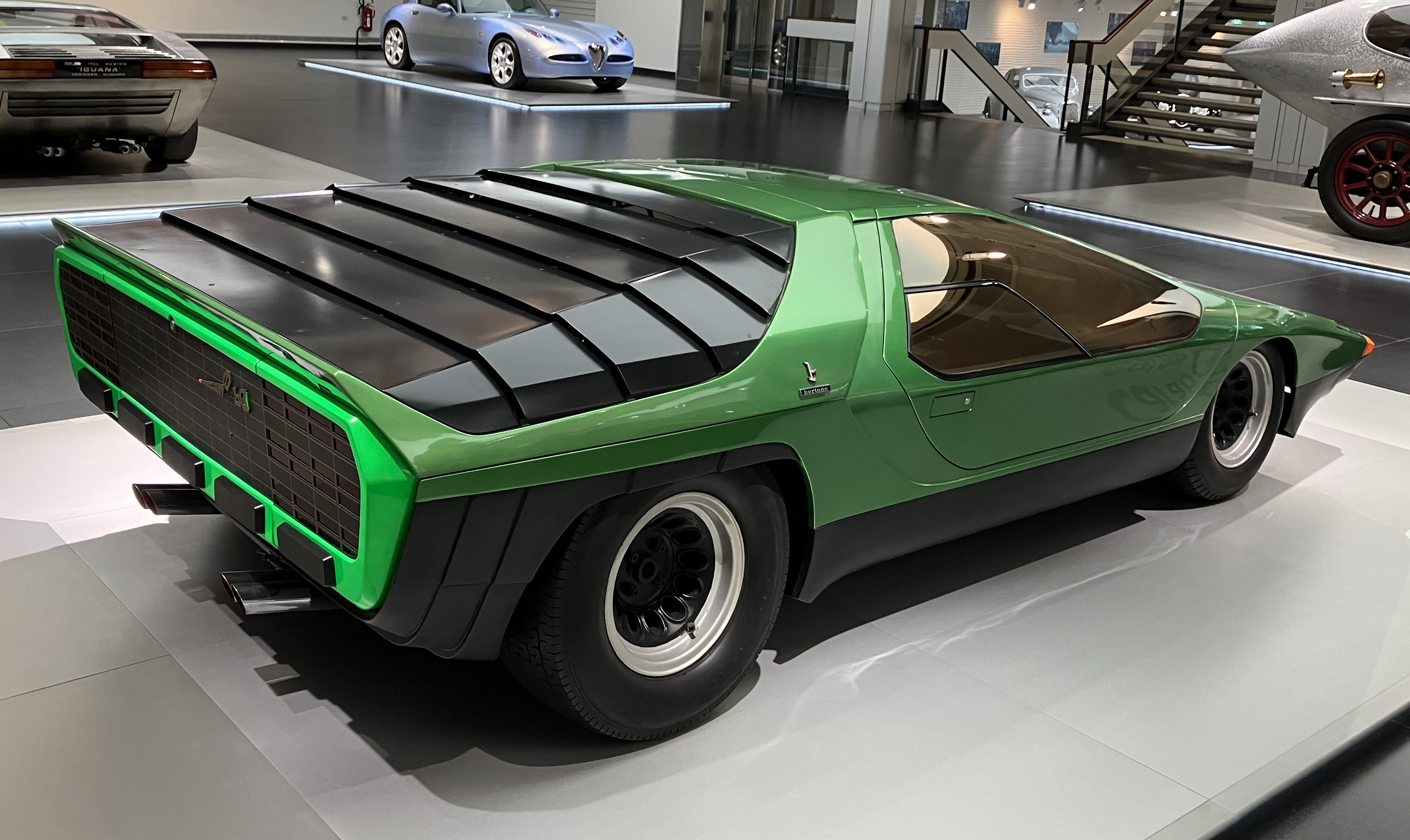
Rear side view of the Carabo at the Alfa Romeo Museum

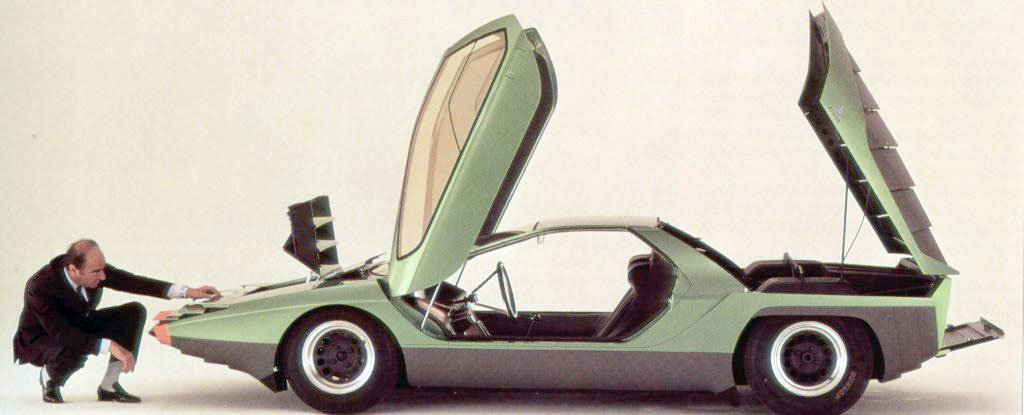
Nuccio Bertone next to the Carabo
