= Alfa Romeo Montreal =

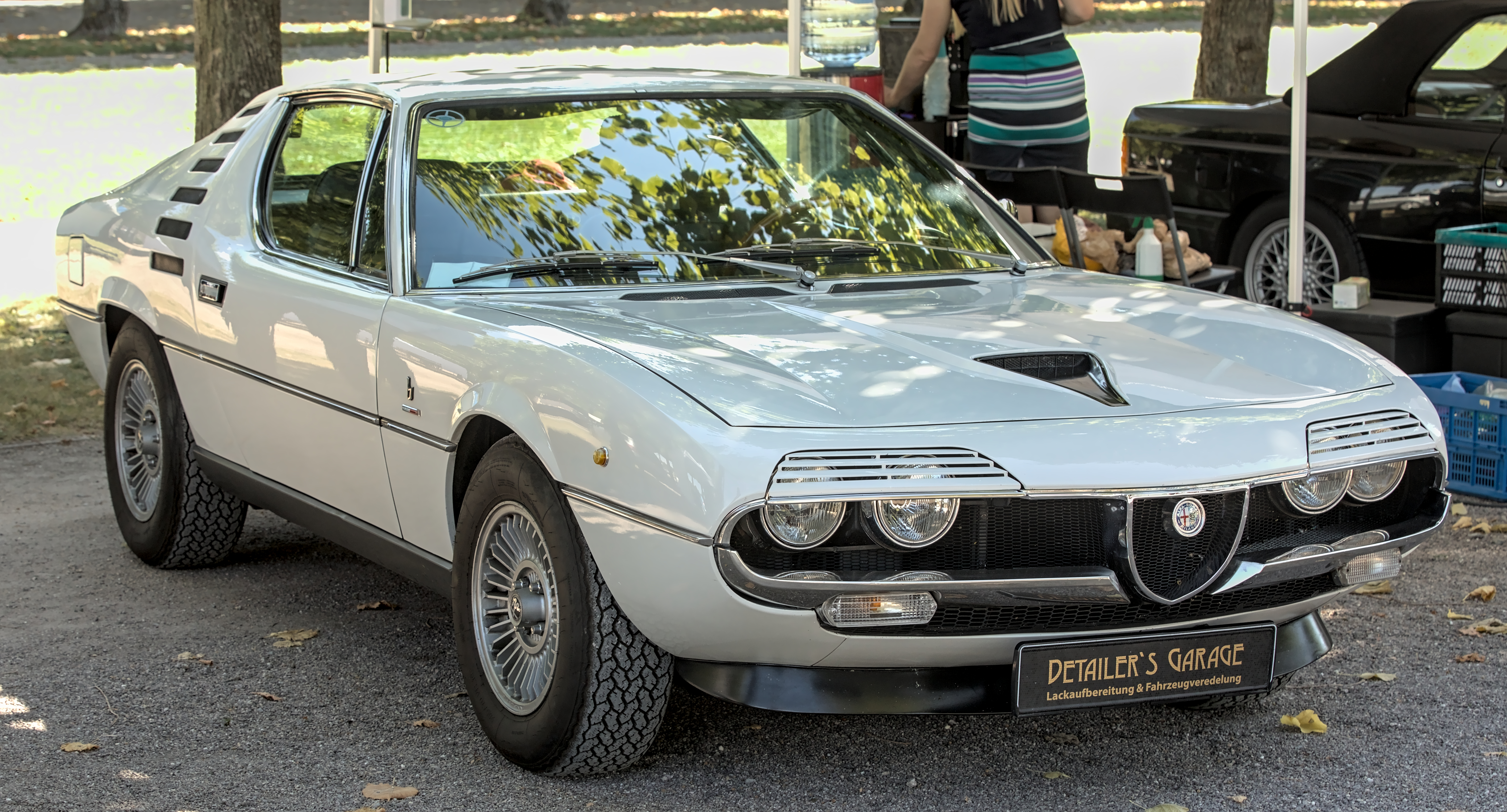

Overview
- Manufacturer: Alfa Romeo
- Production: 1970–1977
- Assembly: Italy: Turin (Bertone)
- Designer: Marcello Gandini at Bertone

Body and chassis
- Class: Sports car (S)
- Body style: 2-door 2+2 coupé
- Layout: Front-engine, rear-wheel-drive
- Related: Alfa Romeo Sprint GT (Veloce)

Powertrain
- Engine: 2.6 L DOHC V8
- Transmission: 5-speed ZF manual

Dimensions
- Wheelbase: 2.35 m (92.5 in)
- Length: 4.22 m (166.1 in)
- Width: 1.672 m (65.8 in)
- Height: 1.205 m (47.4 in)
- Kerb weight: 1,270 kg (2,800 lb)

The Alfa Romeo Montreal is a sports car produced by the Italian automobile manufacturer Alfa Romeo from 1970 to 1977.

== History ==
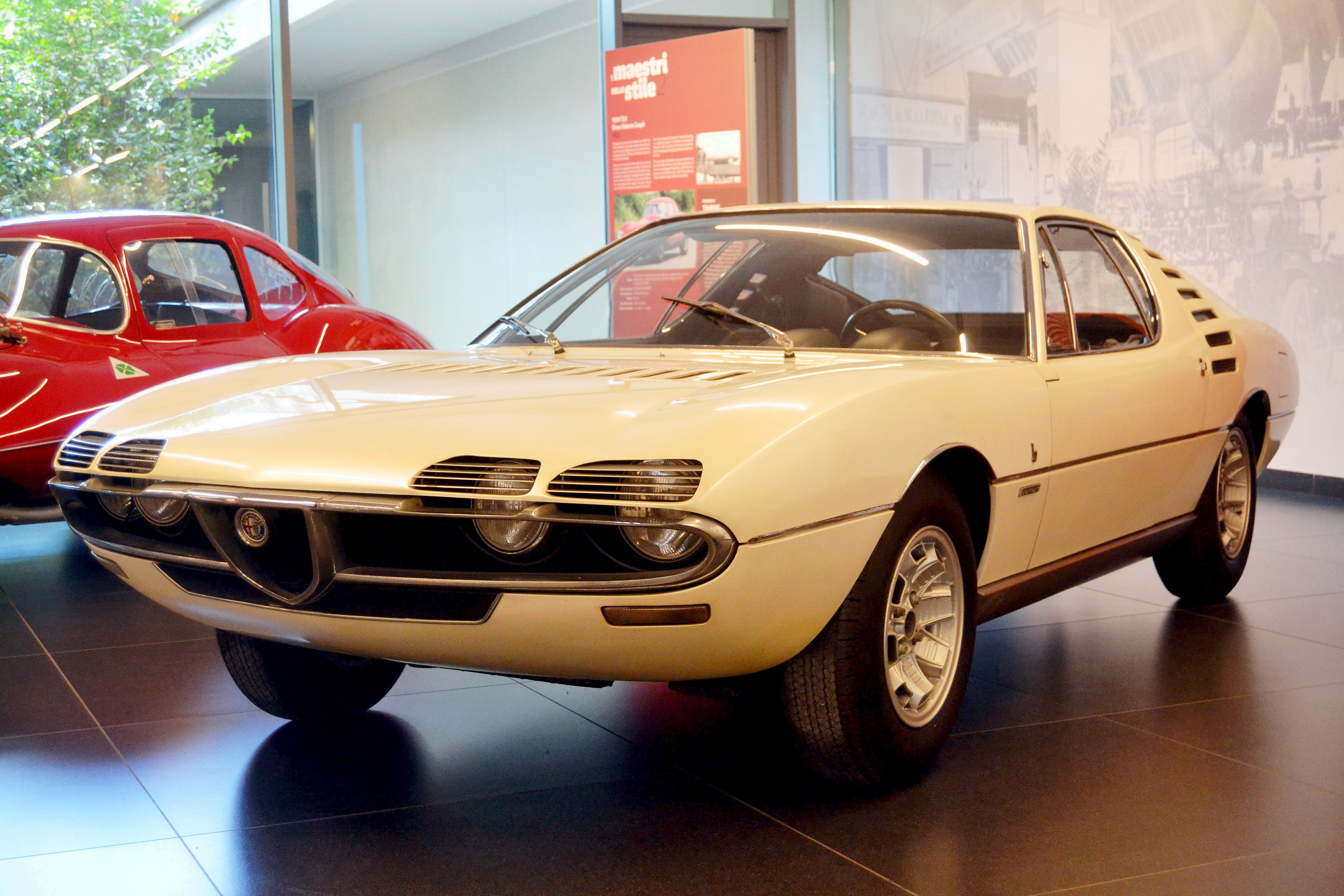
Montreal prototype

The Alfa Romeo Montreal was introduced as a concept car in 1967 at the Expo 67, held in Montreal, Quebec, Canada. Originally, the concept cars were displayed without any model name, but the public took to calling it The Montreal. It was a 2-door 2+2 coupe designed by Marcello Gandini at Bertone using the 1.6-litre engine of the Giulia TI and the short wheelbase chassis of the Giulia Sprint GT. Paolo Martin is credited for the prototype's instrument cluster. One of the two concept cars built for Expo 67 is displayed in the Alfa Romeo Historical Museum in Arese, Italy, while the other is in the museum storage.

== Production version ==
The first production car, designated Tipo 105.64, was shown at the 1970 Geneva Motor Show and featured substantial changes from the concept car, using a 2,593 cc 90° dry-sump lubricated, cross-plane V8 engine with a bore of 80.0 mm and a stroke of only 64.5 mm using SPICA (Società Pompe Iniezione Cassani & Affini) fuel injection that produced around 200 PS (147 kW; 197 hp), coupled to a five-speed ZF manual gearbox and a limited-slip differential. This engine was inspired by, but not derived from the 2-litre V8 used in the 33 Stradale and in the Tipo 33 sports prototype racer, and shares no parts with those engines. The chassis and running gear of the production car were shared with the Giulia GTV coupé and comprised double wishbone suspension with coil springs and dampers at the front and a live axle with limited slip differential at the rear.

Since the concept car was already unofficially known as The Montreal, Alfa Romeo kept this name for the production car as well. Despite the name, Alfa Romeo chose not to submit the Montreal to emissions testing in the United States or Canada, and ultimately the car was never officially exported to those markets.

Stylistically, the most eye-catching feature is the car's front end with four headlamps partly covered by unusual "grilles", that retract when the lamps are switched on (a compromise Gandini had to make to meet regulations for the height of headlamps in certain markets). Another stylistic element is the NACA duct on the bonnet. The duct is actually blocked off since its purpose is not to draw air into the engine, but to optically hide the power bulge. The slats behind the doors contain the cabin vents, but apart from that only serve cosmetic purposes.

The Montreal was more expensive to buy than the Jaguar E-Type or the Porsche 911. When launched in the UK it was priced at £5,077, rising to £5,549 in August 1972 and to £6,999 by mid-1976. This dampened the interest of the buying public which was already considering fuel efficient options due to the 1973 oil crisis. Production of the Montreal came to an end in 1977 after 3,917 examples had been built.

== Production ==
Production was split between the Alfa Romeo plant in Arese and Carrozzeria Bertone's plants in Caselle and Grugliasco outside Turin. Alfa Romeo produced the chassis and engine and mechanicals and sent the chassis to Caselle where Bertone fitted the body. After body fitment, the car was sent to Grugliasco to be degreased, partly zinc coated, manually spray painted and have the interior fitted. Finally, the car was returned to Arese to have the engine and mechanicals installed. Because of this production method, there is not necessarily any correspondence between chassis number, engine number and production date.

The Montreal remained generally unchanged until it was finally removed from pricelists in 1977. By then, production had long ceased as Alfa struggled to sell its remaining stock. Total production was around 3,900.

== Gallery ==
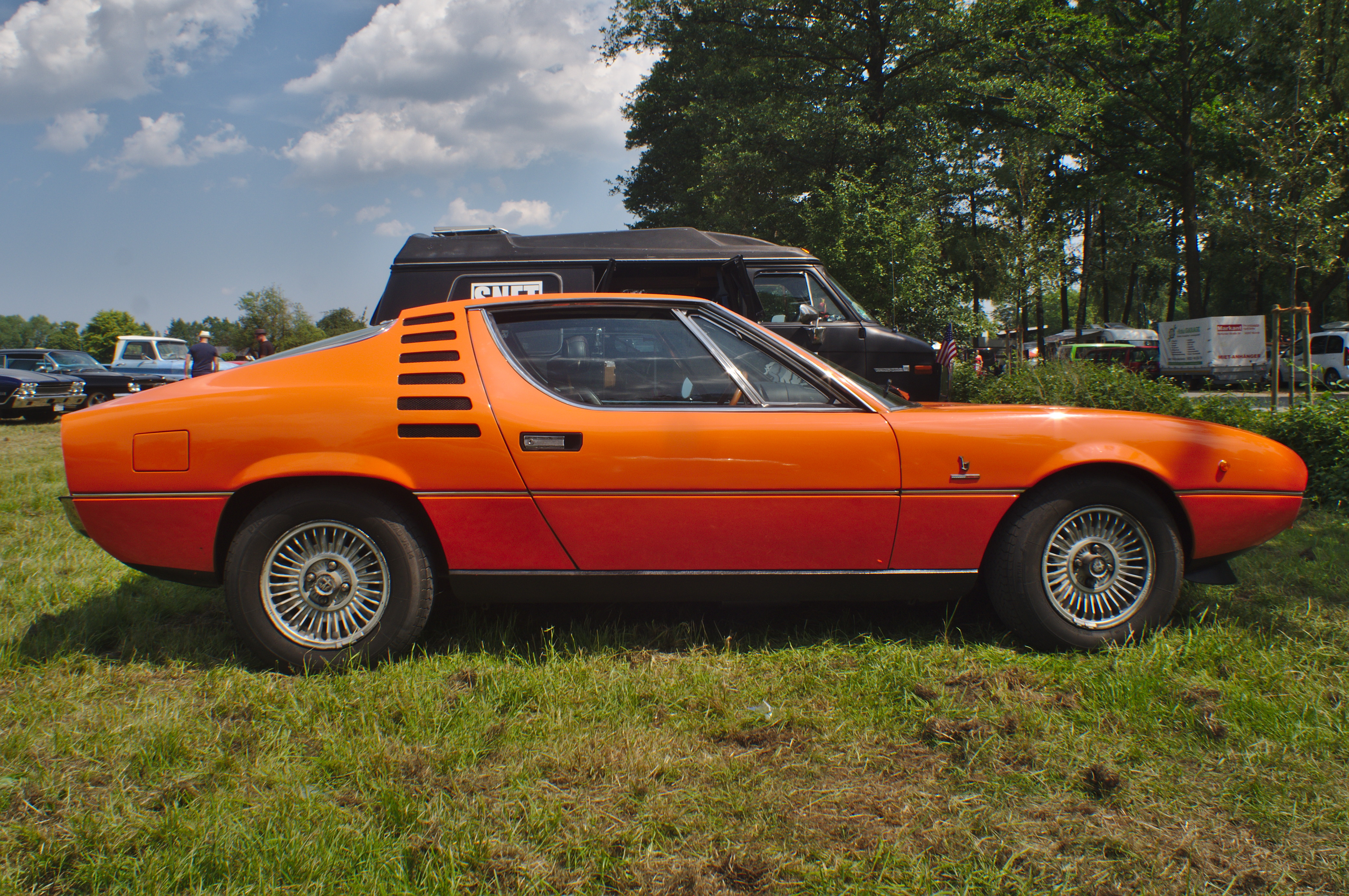
Side profile

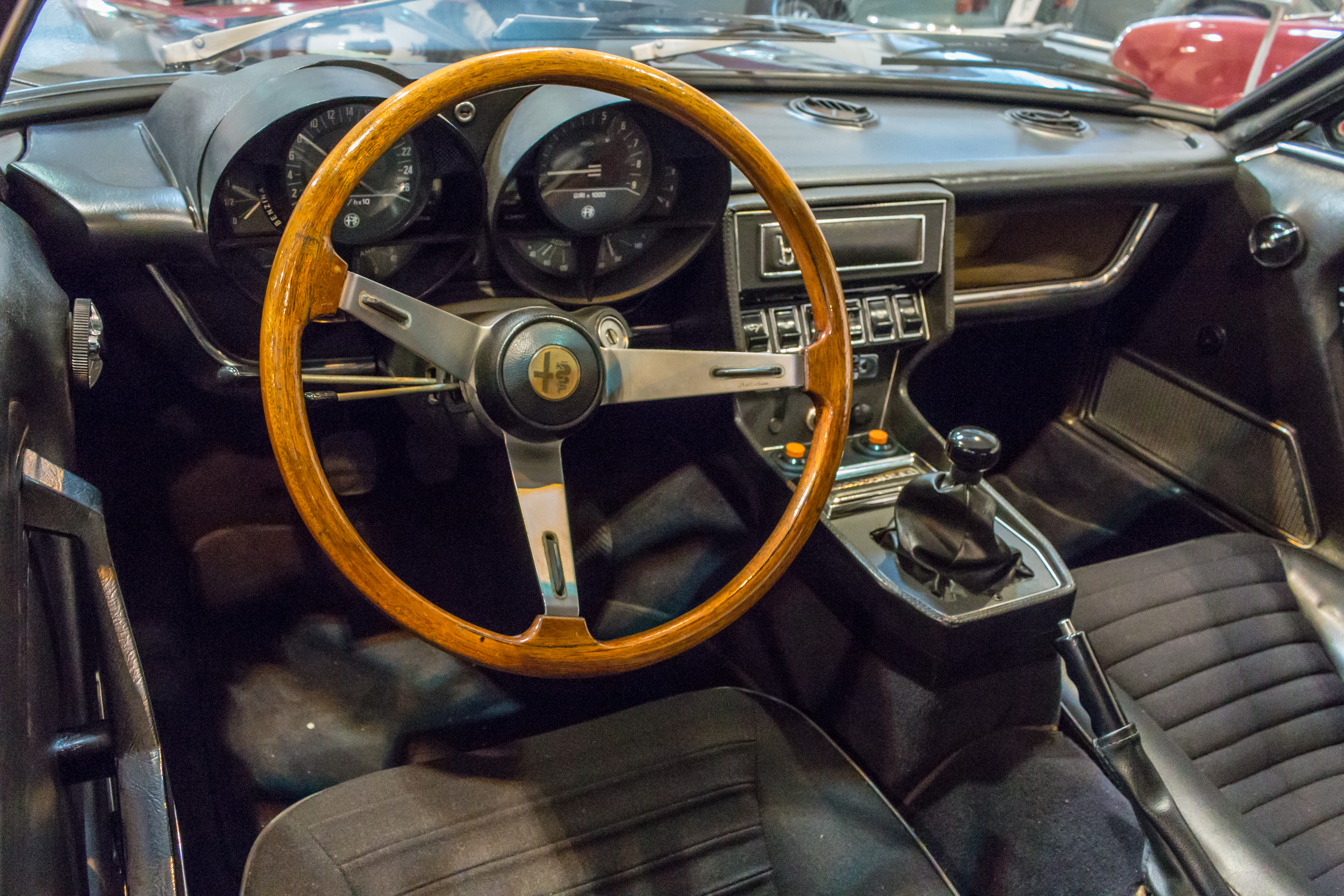
Interior

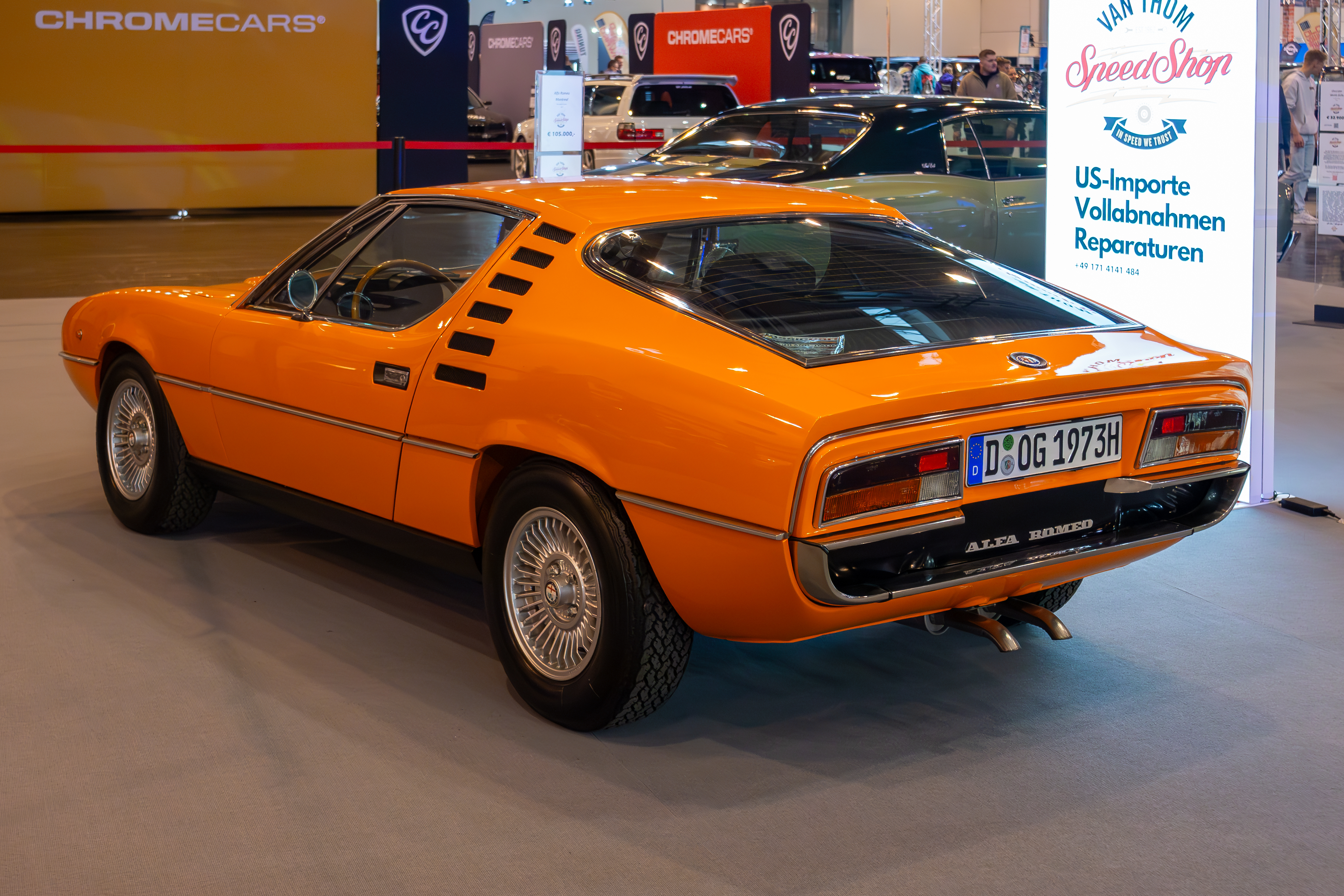
Rear view

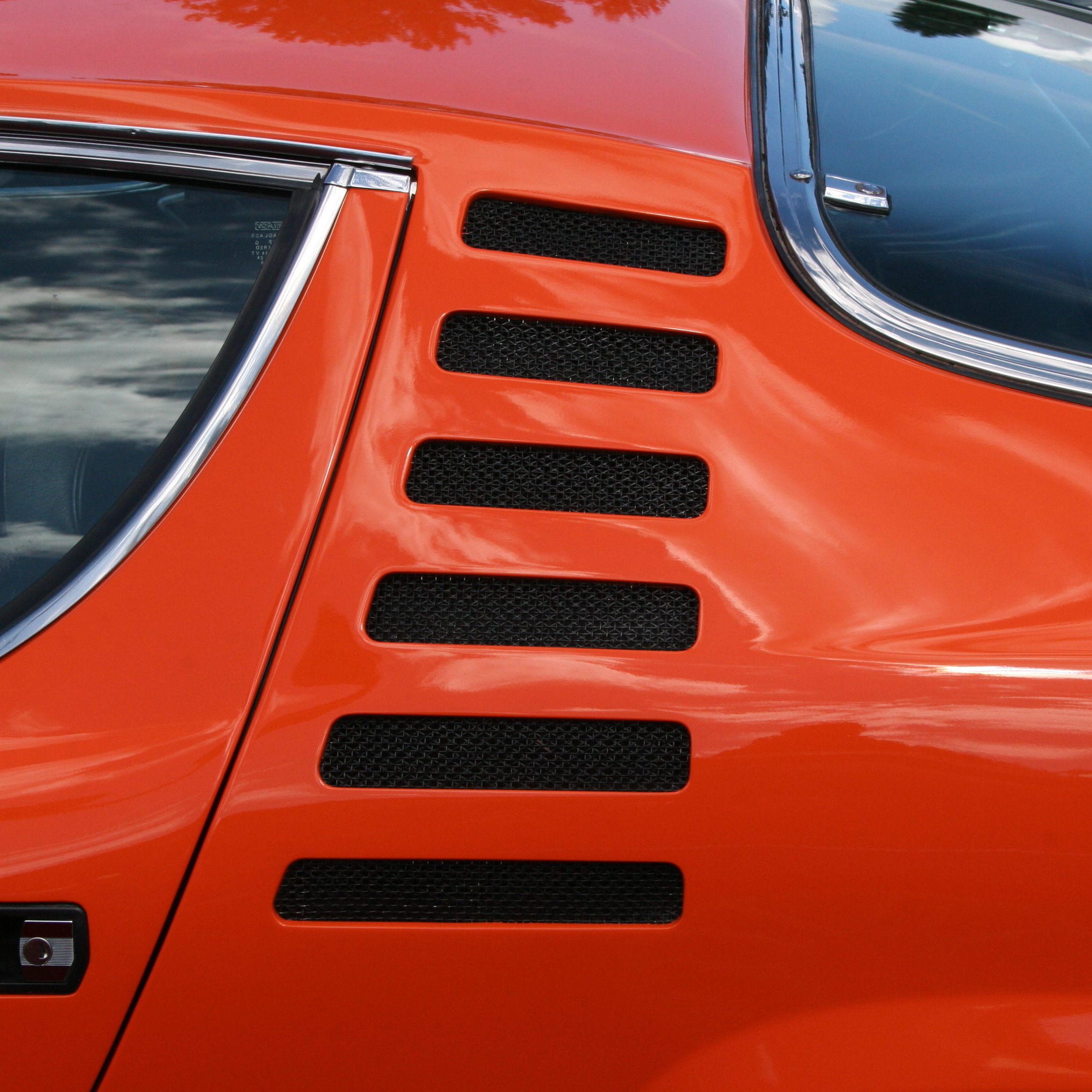
C pillar

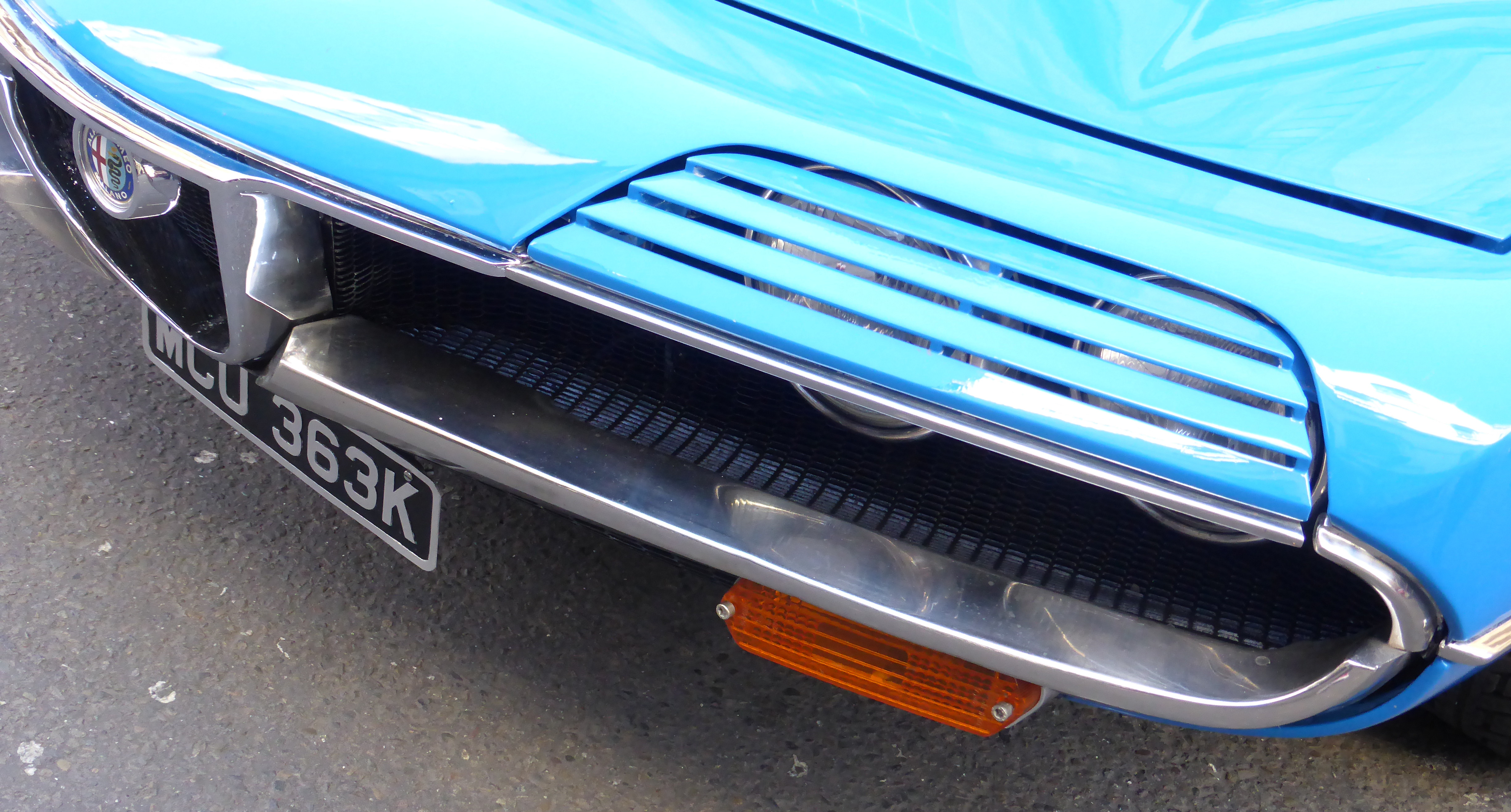
Retractable headlamp grille

== Autodelta Montreal Group 4 '72 ==
A Group 4 Montreal was built by Autodelta in late 1972. It was launched at the London Racing Car Show in January 1973. It was sold to Alfa Romeo Germany to be used in the DRM series for GT cars. Ready to race in May 1973, the car was entrusted to specialist racing team of Dieter Gleich, who was also the principle driver. The Autodelta race car had a 2,997 cc engine with maximum power output of 370 hp (276 kW) at 9,000 rpm. Without any further development the car was outdated very soon. A Montreal was also campaigned in the United States but also without success.

== Performance and specifications ==
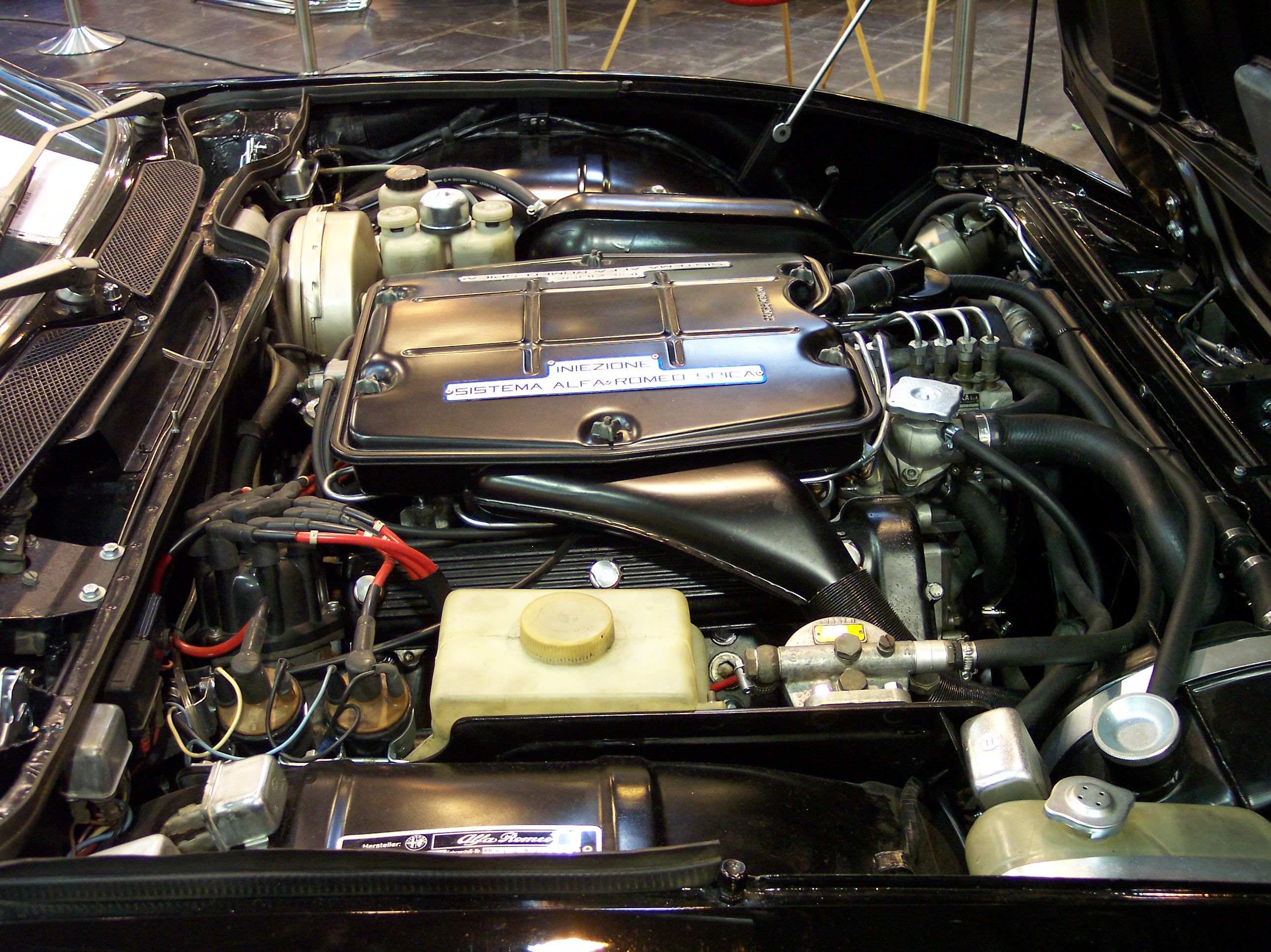
Engine

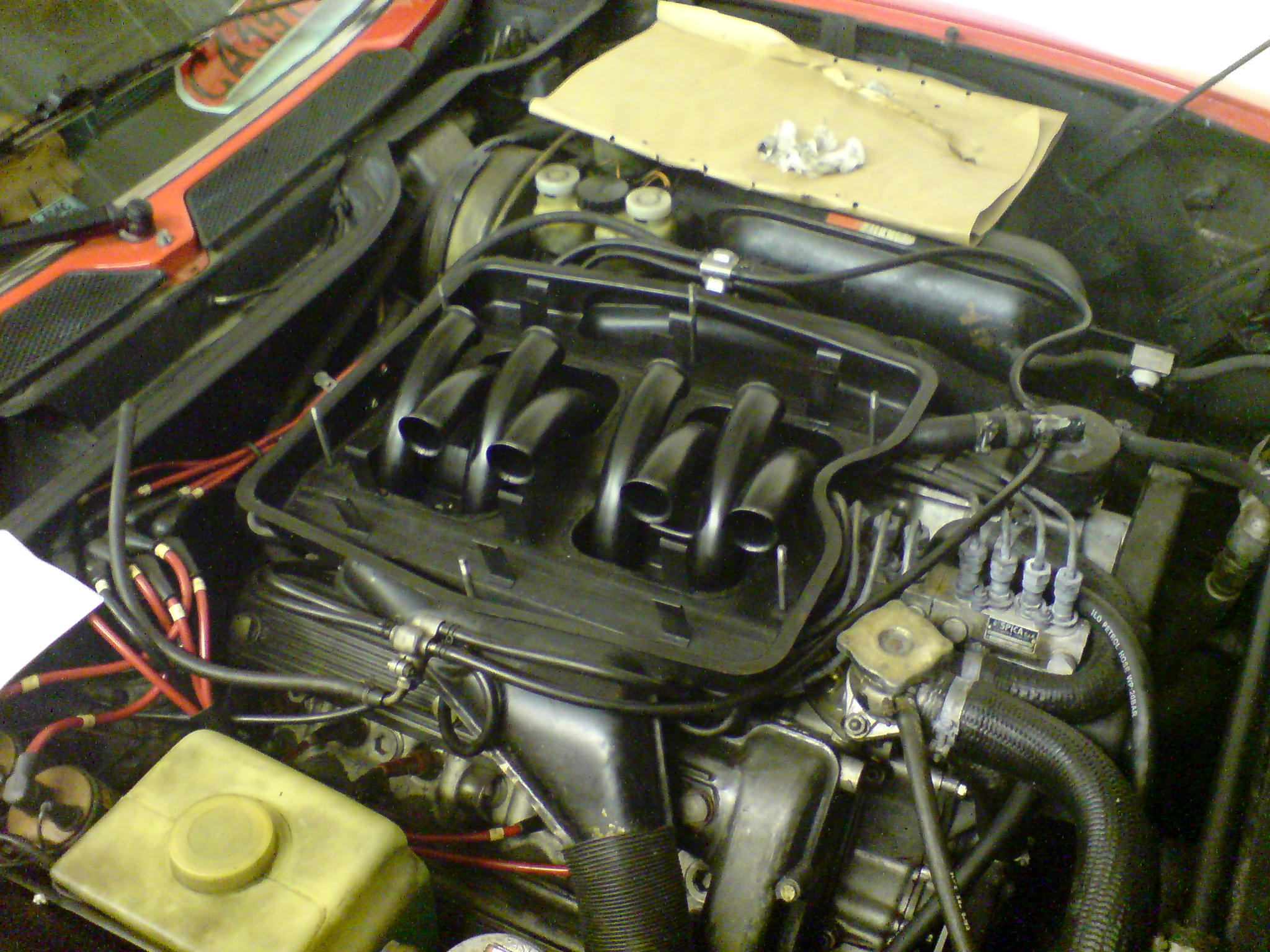
Engine with removed cover of the air intake chamber

Specs	Data
Montreal V8	
Top speed	220 km/h (137 mph)
Acceleration, 0–100 km/h (62 mph)	7.4 seconds
Standing kilometer	27.6 seconds
Standing quarter mile (~400 m)	15.1 seconds
Engine Type	Oversquare 90° crossplane Alfa Romeo V8 DOHC aluminum engine with 2 valves per cylinder and SPICA fuel injection. Dry sump lubrication.
Internal Dimensions	Bore: 80.0 mm (3.15 in); Stroke: 64.5 mm (2.54 in); Compression Ratio: 9.0:1
Displacement	2,593 cc (158.2 cu in)
Power	200 PS (147 kW; 197 hp) at 6500 rpm
Torque	235 N⋅m (173 lb⋅ft) at 4750 rpm
Tire Dimensions	195/70 VR 14" – 225/50 VR 16"

== See also ==
- Alfa Romeo 33 Stradale
