= Airbox =

Empty chamber in most combustion engines

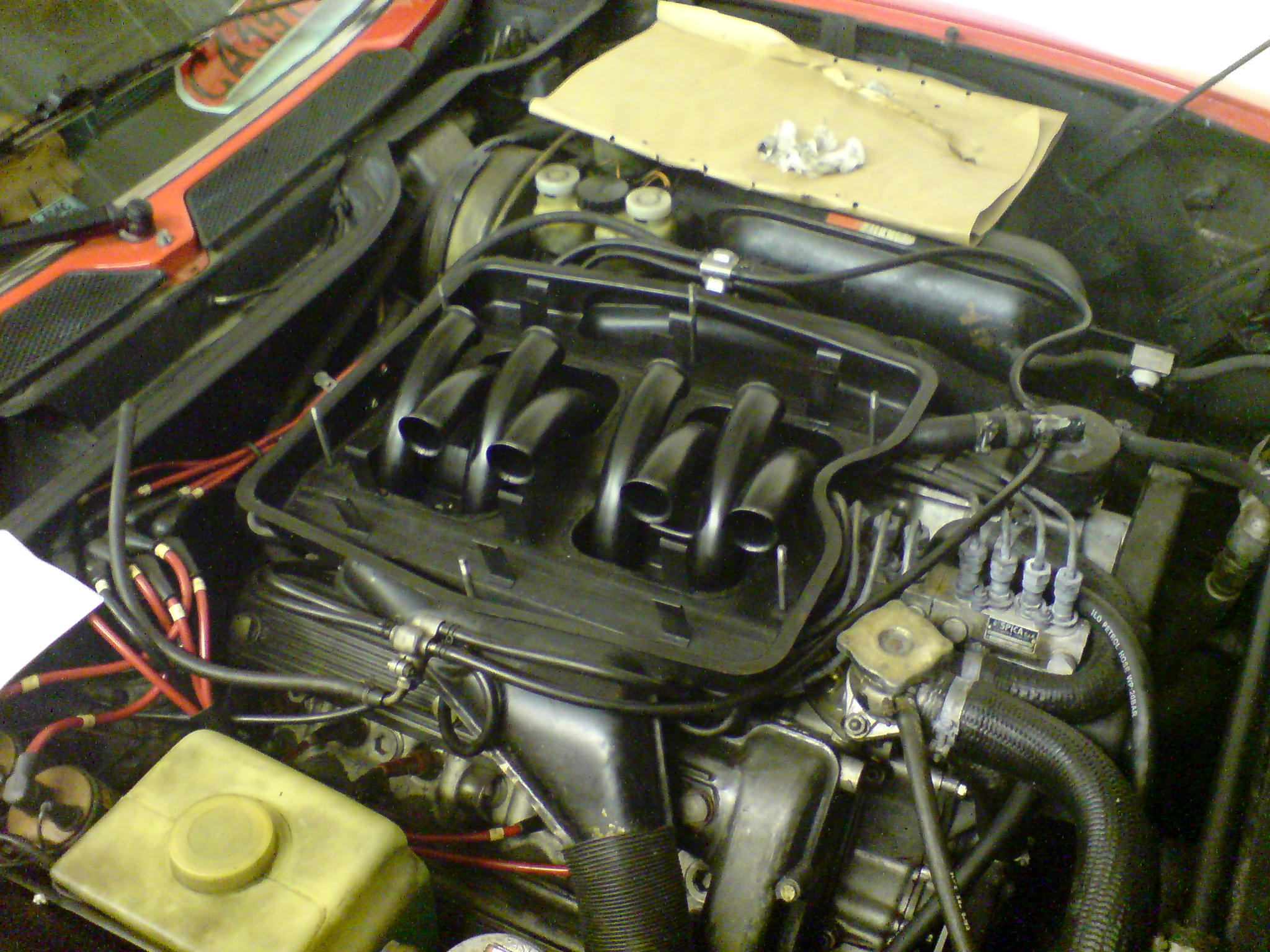
Inside the airbox of an Alfa Romeo Montreal

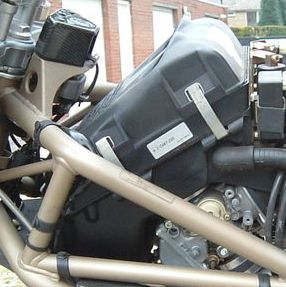
Motorcycle airbox on a V-2 engine.

An airbox is an empty chamber on the inlet of most combustion engines. It collects air from outside and feeds it to the intake hoses of each cylinder.

Older engines drew air directly from the surroundings into each individual carburetor. Modern engines instead draw air into an airbox, which is connected by individual hoses to each carburetor or directly to the intake ports in fuel-injected engines, thus avoiding an extra intake manifold.

The airbox allows the use of one air filter instead of multiples, reducing complexity. Developments arising from concerns about engine emissions during the late 1970s allow the airbox to collect pump gases from the crankcase and the tank air vent and re-feed them to the engine.

== Developments ==
Since the 1990s, engine designers also sought to exploit the properties of oscillating gas to improve performance.

Many high-performance motorcycles have the airbox fed from funnels in the front of the bike, where increased pressure forces more air into the intake and thus improves power. Examples of this ram-air intake construction are the SRAD models of the Suzuki GSX-R750, the Kawasaki Ninja ZX-6R or the BMW S1000RR.

Secondly, designers exploit a property of air cavities known as Helmholtz resonance. Flow through the airbox is optimal at its resonance frequency, which depends on airbox volume and the inlet area and length of the snorkel. The resonance is typically chosen to be at a medium speed where torque otherwise drops, caused by valve timing overlap.
