= Alfa Romeo Navajo =

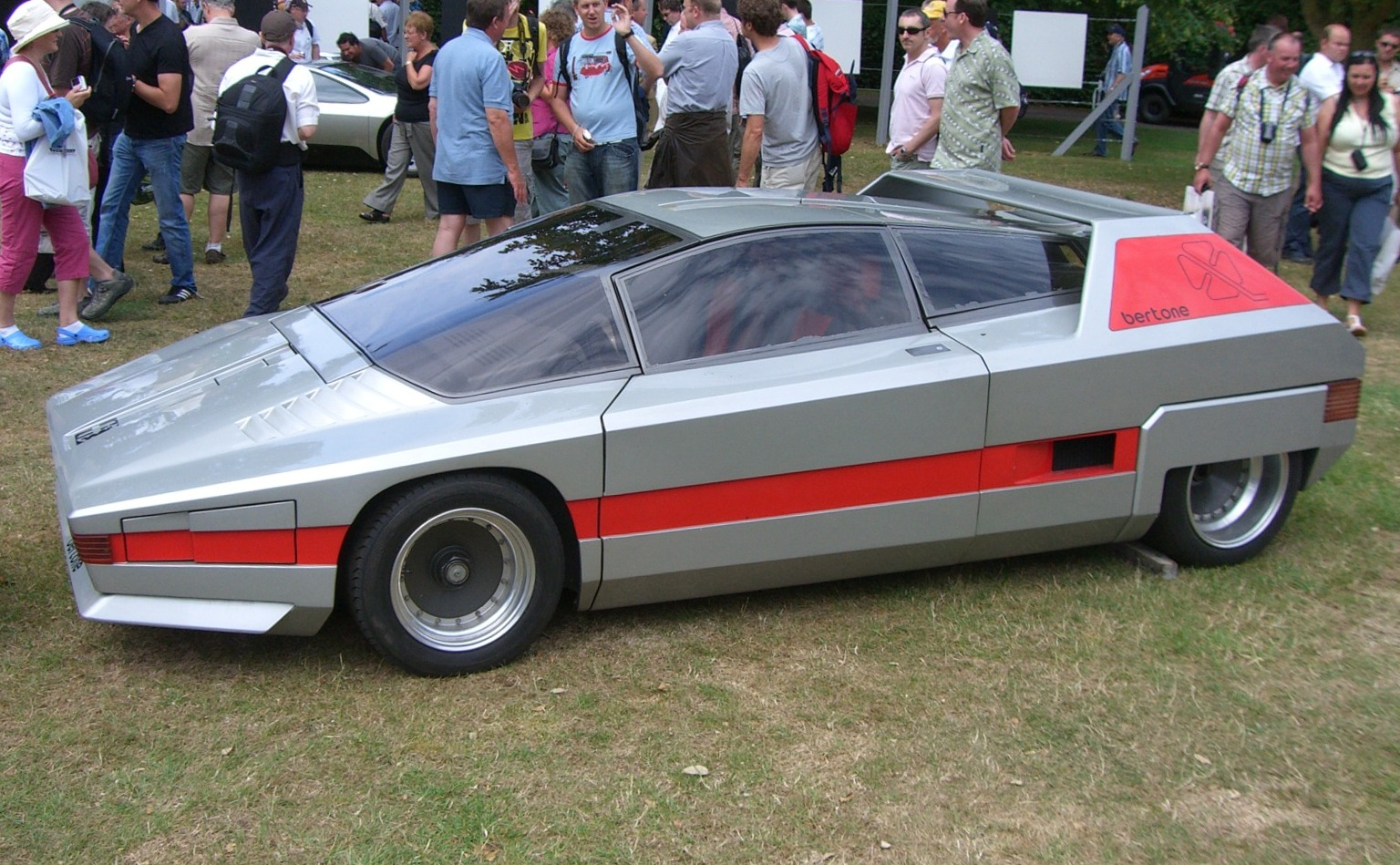

Overview
- Manufacturer: Gruppo Bertone
- Also called: Alfa Romeo 33 Navajo
- Production: 1976
- Designer: Marcello Gandini at Bertone

Body and chassis
- Class: Concept car
- Body style: 2-door coupe
- Layout: Rear mid-engine, rear wheel drive
- Related: Alfa Romeo 33 Stradale

Powertrain
- Engine: 2.0 L V8
- Transmission: 6-speed Colotti manual

Dimensions
- Wheelbase: 2,430 mm (95.7 in)
- Length: 3,800 mm (149.6 in)
- Width: 1,860 mm (73.2 in)
- Height: 1,050 mm (41.3 in)
- Curb weight: 870 kg (1,918 lb)

The Alfa Romeo Navajo is a concept car designed and built by Bertone on the chassis of an Alfa Romeo 33 Stradale, and introduced at the 1976 Geneva Motor Show.

== History ==
The Navajo was the last of six concept cars built on the chassis of the 33 Stradale by various coachbuilders. The Navajo was built on chassis number 750.33.117.

== Specifications ==
The frame of the 33 Stradale was lengthened in the center to 2430 mm to be able to mount a light fiberglass body with a "wedge" design typical of the 1970s. The tapered front is balanced by the large rear end topped by a trapezoidal rear wing that can adjust its angle depending on the speed. The Navajo also features an active front splitter which can be adjusted depending on speed. This feature was put into production almost ten years later on the Bertone designed Alfa Romeo 90.

The retractable headlights have a unique configuration: they do not rise from the hood but instead extend horizontally from the fenders. On the front hood, there are gills to vent hot air from the radiator and a sticker with the stylized Alfa Romeo logo.

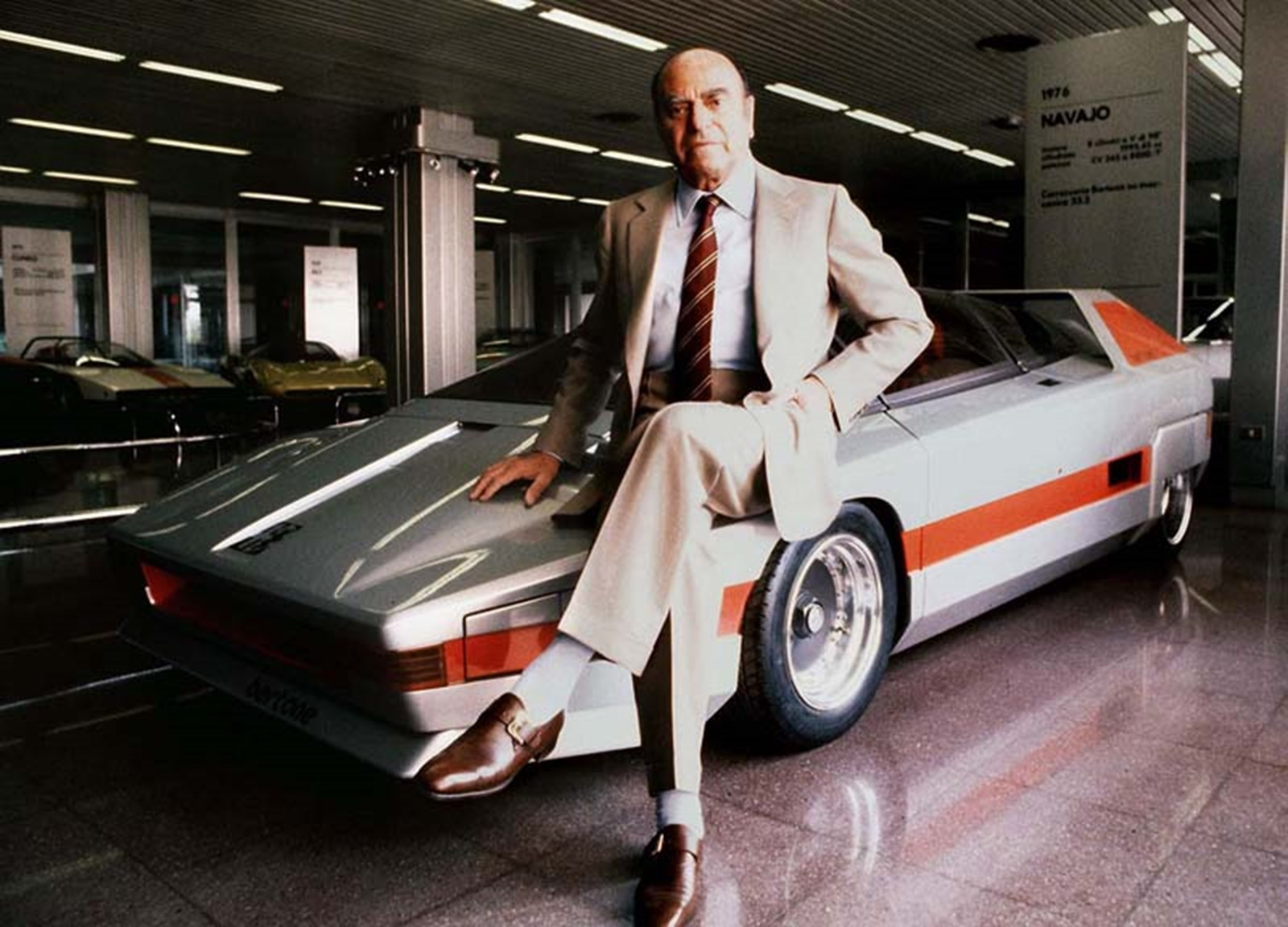
Nuccio Bertone sitting on the Navajo

The side is crossed by an orange longitudinal rib, contrasting with the silver paint of the rest of the body, which ends with the air intake to cool the brakes.

Inside, in addition to the two fiberglass seats, there is a tubular dashboard equipped with a digital instrument panel and levers instead of the classic buttons to operate the on-board controls.

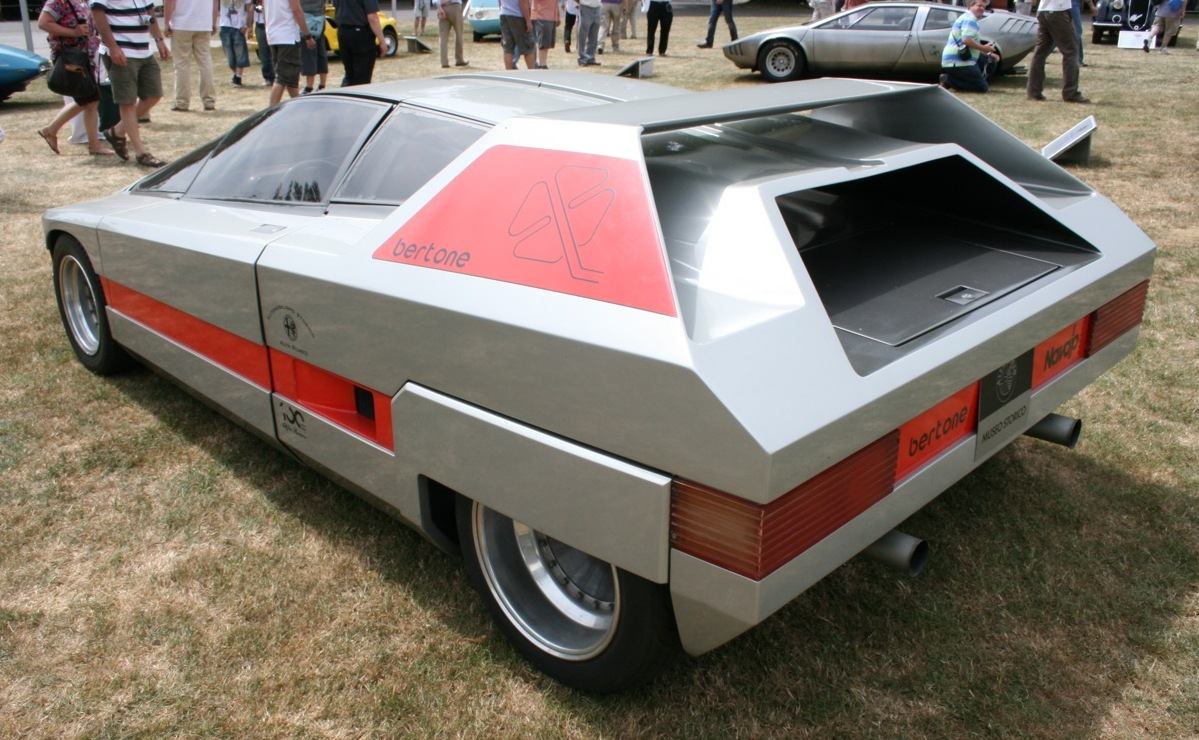
Alfa Romeo Navajo rear

The car is powered by the running gear of the 33 Stradale, using a 2.0 L (1995 cm^{3}) V8 engine with four overhead camshafts (two per bank) and SPICA mechanical injection capable of producing around 230 PS (169 kW; 227 hp) at 8800 rpm. The engine is coupled to a 6-speed manual transmission, and the drivetrain is mounted longitudinally, with the engine mounted in front of the rear axle and the transmission mounted behind it.

After participating in various shows, the car became part of the Museo Alfa Romeo collection where it is still located together with the other prototypes based on the 33 Stradale.
