= SPICA =

Italian fuel injection system manufacturer

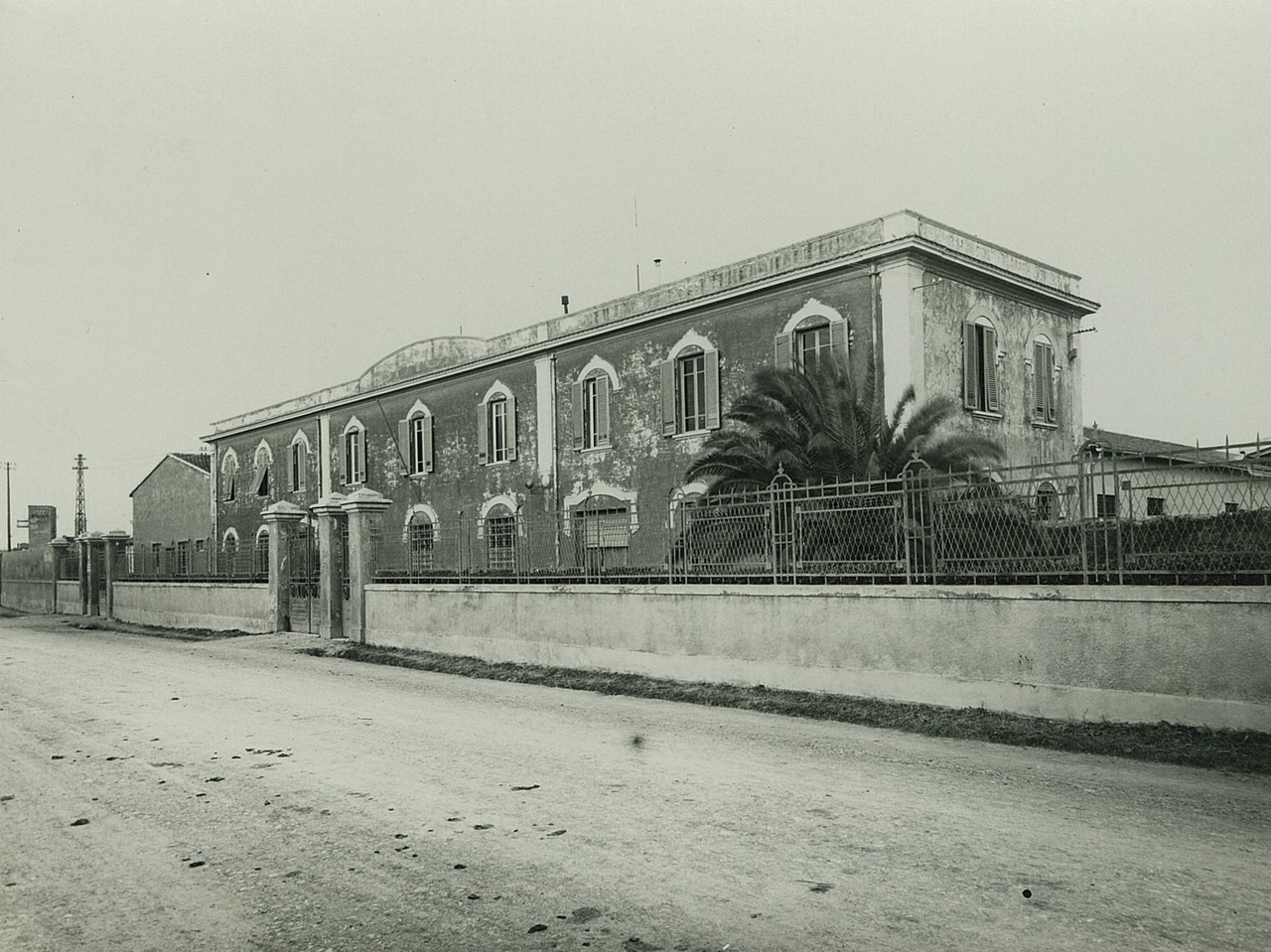
SPICA plant

SPICA S.p.A. (Società Pompe Iniezione Cassani & Affini) was an Italian manufacturer of fuel injection systems.

== History ==
The company was founded by Francesco Cassani in 1932. and manufactured fuel injection systems for diesel and petrol engines. In 1941 Alfa Romeo took control of the company. Later the company also produced spark plugs, shock absorbers, oil pumps and other automobile parts. In 1987 the company became part of the Fiat Group. In 1995 it was sold to Delphi and TRW.

Company founder Francesco Cassani left in 1942 to found a new company with his brother Eugenio called SAME (Società Accomandita Motori Endotermici). Today that company is known as SAME Deutz-Fahr.

== See also ==
- List of Italian companies
