= Anadol =

Defunct Turkish motor vehicle manufacturer

ANADOL
- Type: Private
- Industry: Automotive
- Founded: 1966
- Defunct: 1991
- Headquarters: Istanbul, Turkey
- Key people: Vehbi Koç
- Products: Automobile, Pick-Up
- Parent: Koç Holding

Anadol was Turkey's first domestic mass-production passenger vehicle company. Its first model, Anadol A1 (1966–1975) was the second Turkish car after the ill-fated Devrim sedan of 1961. Anadol cars and pick-ups were manufactured by Otosan Otomobil Sanayii in Istanbul between 1966 and 1991.

The brand's name was derived from the Turkish name of Anatolia (Anadolu) and its logo was the Hittite stag.

Seven Anadol models were produced: A1 (1966–1975), A2 (1970–1981), STC-16 (1973–1975), SV-1600 (1973–1982), Böcek (1975–1977), A8-16 (1981–1984) and Otosan P2 500 pick-up (1971–1991).

Production of the Anadol passenger cars was discontinued in 1986, while the production of the Otosan 500 Pick-Up continued until 1991. At present, Otosan builds Ford Motor Company's passenger cars and commercial vehicles, which are exported to numerous countries in the world, particularly those in the European Union.

== Anadol A1 (1966–1975) ==
Anadol A1
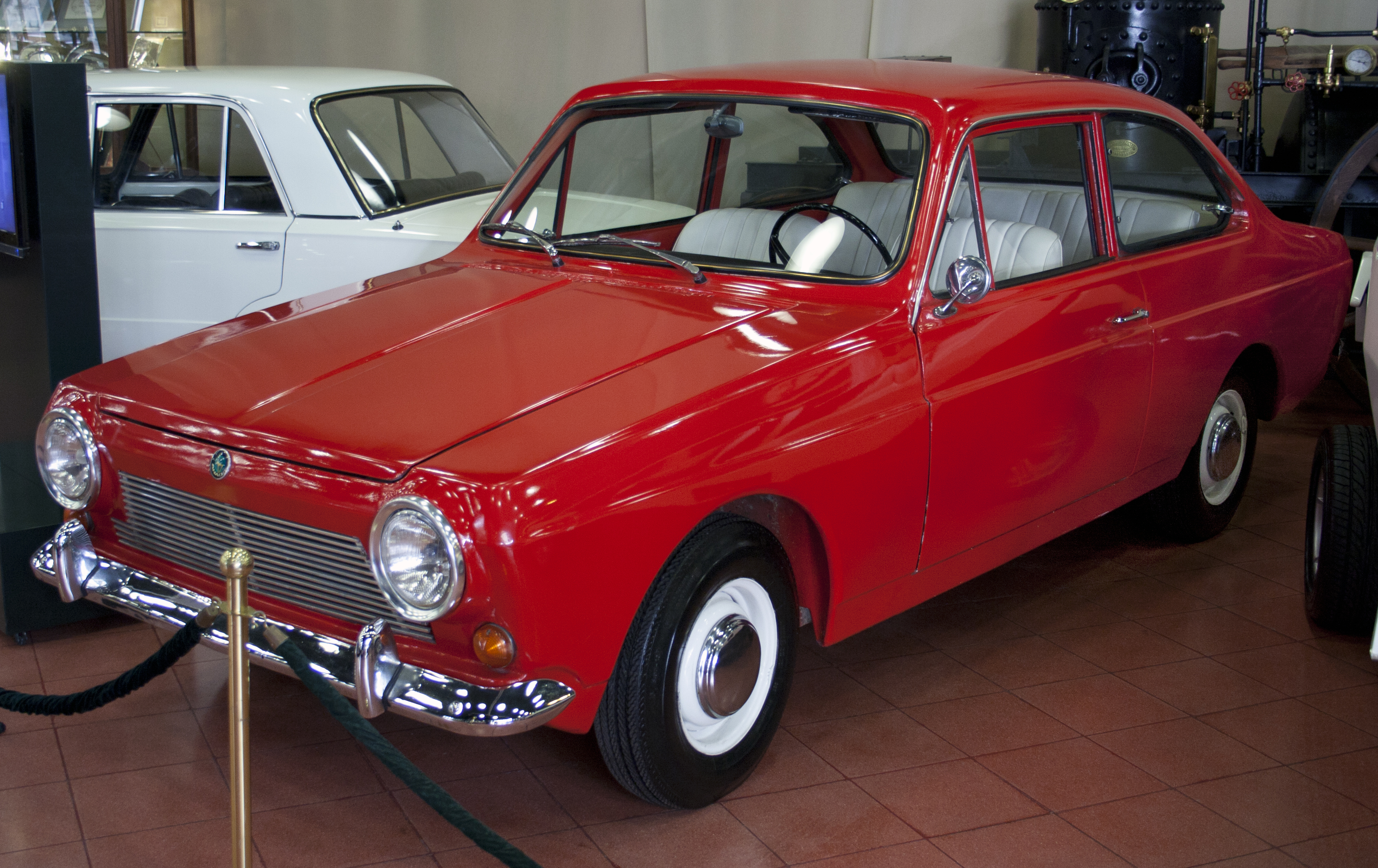

Overview
- Production: 1966–1975
- Designer: Ogle

Body and chassis
- Body style: 2-door coupé; 4-door saloon; 5-door estate

Powertrain
- Engine: 1,198 cc (1.2 L) Ford Kent I4; 1,297 cc (1.3 L) Ford Kent I4
- Transmission: 4-speed manual

Dimensions
- Wheelbase: 2,565 mm (101.0 in)
- Length: 4,381 mm (172.5 in)
- Width: 1,644 mm (64.7 in)
- Height: 1,422 mm (56.0 in)
- Curb weight: 828 kg (1,825.4 lb)

The Anadol A1, code named FW5 by Reliant which developed the prototype upon Anadol's request, went into production on 19 December 1966. The styling of the A1 was by Tom Karen of Ogle Design. In 1967, a New Zealand entrepreneur, Alan Gibbs, announced that he intended to also produce the car in his country as the Anziel Nova. This project never proceeded beyond the initial announcement and prototype.

Production of the A1 started at Otosan's new eastside Istanbul plant on 16 December 1966 with the 1200 cc Cortina engine, but in October 1968, it was replaced with the stronger 1300 cc Kent engine. In 1969, the dashboard gauges were updated with a new design and their positions were changed, while the ergonomic design of the steering wheel was improved. In 1970, the two round headlamps at the front were replaced with oval headlamps, a new transmission system was introduced, and the bumpers were changed. In 1971, the interior of the roof was covered with vinyl, in accordance with the fashion of that period. The design essentially remained this way until April 1972.

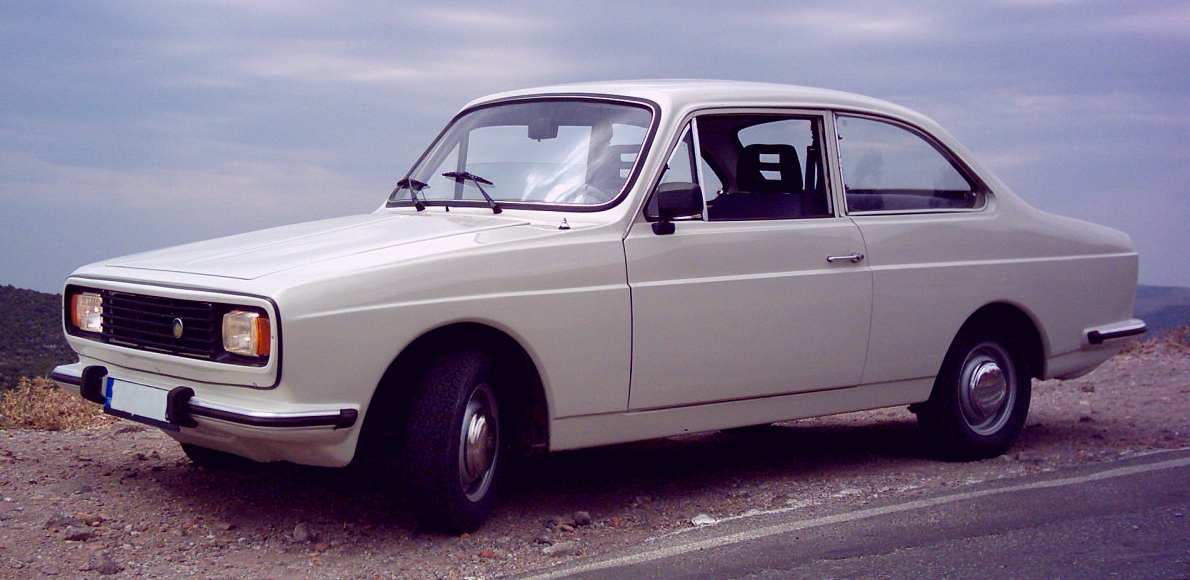
1974 Anadol A1 Mk. II

In 1971, a special model of the A1 was developed in dedication to the Mediterranean Games in İzmir, called the Akdeniz (Mediterranean). Anadol Akdeniz was like a prelude of the new model which arrived in 1972, and had bumpers which were integrated into the shape of the bodywork, a different front grille, rectangular headlamps with white signal lamps, and different rear lights. The interior of the car was also completely changed, with a new dashboard, new seats and new finishing materials. Starting from 1972, this model became the standard coupé of Anadol until its production was stopped in 1975.

The five-seat body was built from fibre glass and affixed to a h-frame chassis. The Anadol was originally only available as a coupé, but in late 1973 was joined by a saloon (sedan) and an estate version. The chassis had independent front suspension utilising coil springs and leaf springs on a live axle for the rear. Brakes were disc in the front and drum in the rear. The steering system used a recirculating ball mechanism.

Anadol A1 was also the first Turkish rally car, and Anadol Ralli Takımı (ART) became the first Turkish rally team. The first official rally in Turkey, the 1968 Trakya (Thrace) Rally, was won by the famous duo of Anadol A1 pilots, Renç Koçibey and Demir Bükey. Other famous Anadol A1 rally pilots included Romolo Marcopoli, İskender Atakan, Claude (Klod) Nahum, Mete Oktar, Şükrü Okçu and Serdar Bostancı.

Still in 1968, another Turkish driver, İskender Aruoba, participated in the 30,000 km Africa-Asia-Europe Tour, which lasted 8 months, with his Anadol A1.

== Anadol A2 (1970–1981) ==
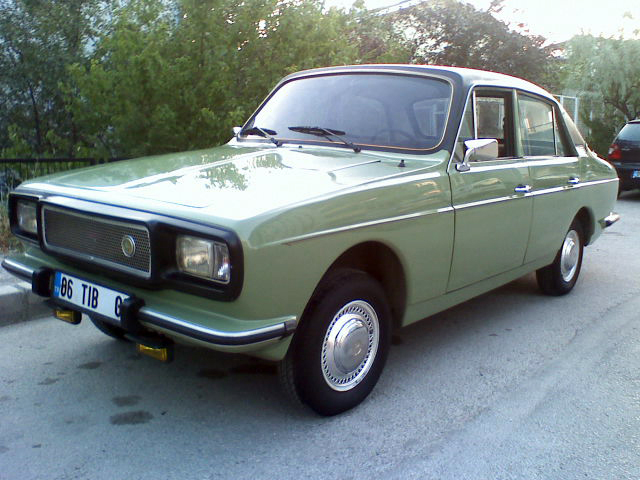
Anadol A2 (1970–1981)

Anadol A2 was both Anadol's first four-door model, and the first fiberglass bodied four-door sedan in the world.

Its prototype was prepared in 1969 and the car was introduced to the market in 1970.

Apart from having four doors and a single wide front bench seat for both the driver and the passenger, the first versions of the A2 shared the same technical specifications with the A1. Starting from April 1972, the front part of the A2 received the same changes that the A1 received that year (including the new nose, front grille and headlamps) and this design went on until the end of 1975.

In 1976, a new version of the A2, the SL, was introduced. The biggest changes in the exterior appearance of the car were made in the front and the back, with new lamps. Particularly, the rear lamps had a completely new appearance. The interior was also completely changed, with a new steering wheel, new dashboard and new finishing materials.

The A2 was also the first Anadol model which received extensive crash tests in order to improve the safety of the car.

Since the A2 was primarily designed as a family sedan, and was also suitable for commercial uses (usually as a taxi), it became the best-selling Anadol passenger car, with a total of 35,668 units sold. The A2 was replaced by the A8-16 in 1981.

== Anadol P2 500 / 600 (1971–1991) ==
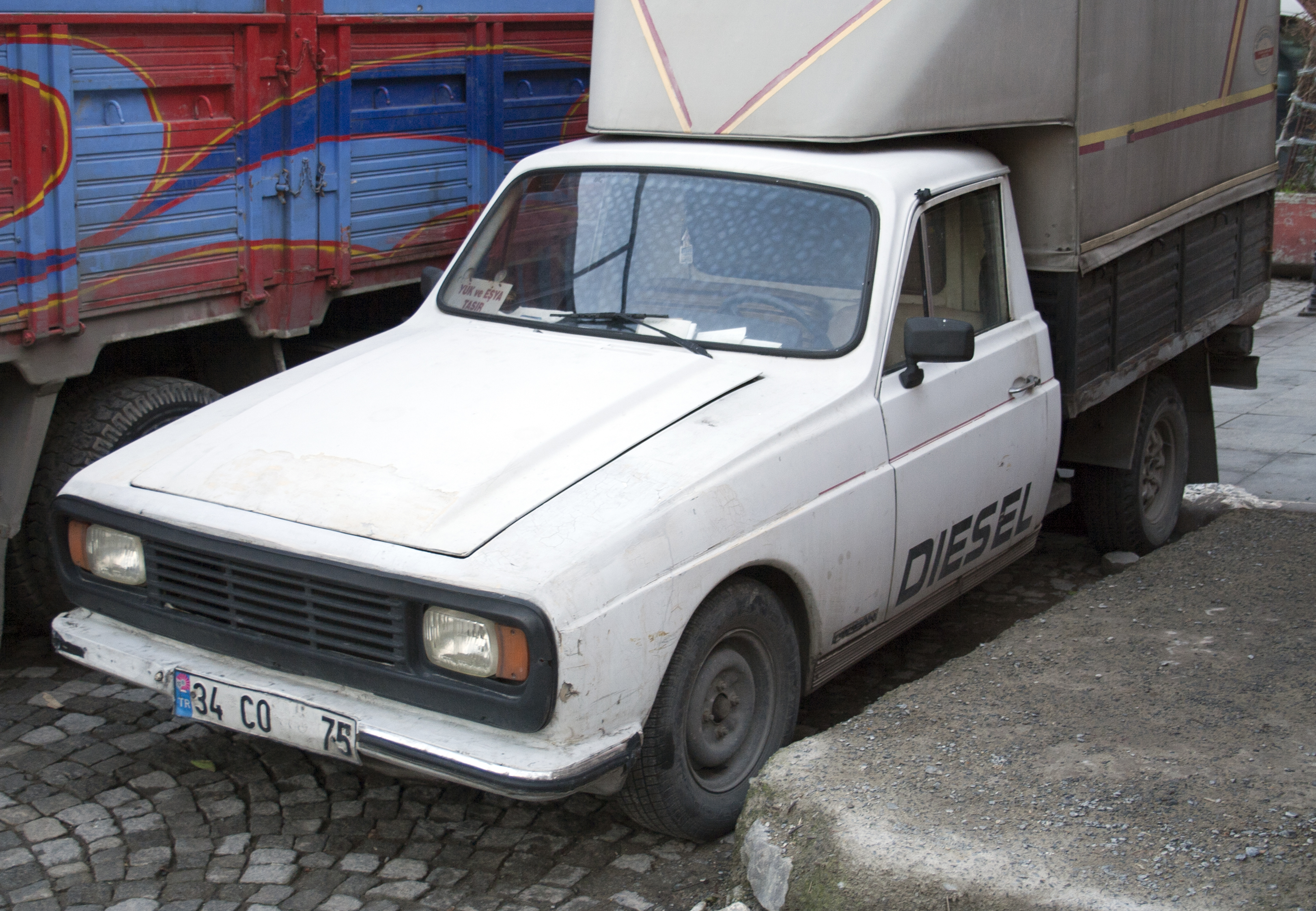
Anadol P2 600D

In trying to fill a need for light transport, the first prototype pickup truck (on A1 basis) was developed by Bernar Nahum in 1970. Serial production began the following year, equipped with the 1.3-liter Ford Crossflow engine also used in saloons. The P2 also received the new nose of the facelifted A1. In the 1980s, this was upgraded to the 1.6-liter Ford Pinto, as seen in other Anadols as well. After 1983, the 600D version was released, with a 1.9-liter diesel engine, which necessitated a slight bulge in the hood. Always high in demand, and used extensively by the Turkish Post (PTT), the pickup continued to be in production until 1991, when 36,892 had been built. Many saloons have also been converted to pickup trucks.

== Anadol STC-16 (1973–1975) ==
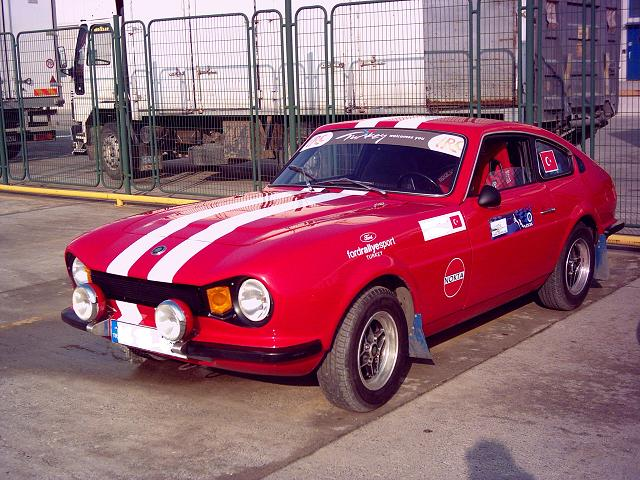
Anadol STC-16 Rally version, which had a lightweight FRP chassis combined with a modified 140 bhp (104 kW; 142 PS) engine.

A sports model, the STC-16, was produced between 1973 and 1975. The first prototype was introduced in 1972.

Designed by Eralp Noyan, the STC-16 was the first Turkish sports car. It was also the second Turkish-designed car after Devrim, which was produced in 1961 as the first Turkish designed and built automobile. The engine of Ford Escort and some of the components of Ford Capri produced by Ford of Europe were also used in the Anadol STC-16. The 1598 cc crossflow engine used in the Anadol STC-16 was originally developed for the 1970 Ford Escort Mexico, the special-edition road version of the Ford Escort rally car which won the 1970 London to Mexico World Cup Rally.

In 1971, Erdoğan Gönül, the General Manager of Otosan and the son-in-law of Vehbi Koç, convinced the latter on the production of a sports car. The car was aimed at the upper segment of the Turkish market and would participate in international rallies, thus bringing prestige to the Anadol brand. The creation works of the STC-16 were assigned to Turkish designer Eralp Noyan, who had graduated from the Royal Fine Arts Academy in Belgium. The STC-16 was a completely new Anadol and looked nothing like the previous models of the brand, although it had similarities with other sports car models of that period, such as the Datsun 240Z and Ginetta G21.

The car's name, "STC-16", was originally an acronym for "Sports Turkish Car 1600", but as it was also intended for international markets, STC was alternatively named as the "Sports Touring Coupé". Among the Turkish youth, however, STC was popularly interpreted as "Süper Türk Canavarı" (Super Turkish Monster).

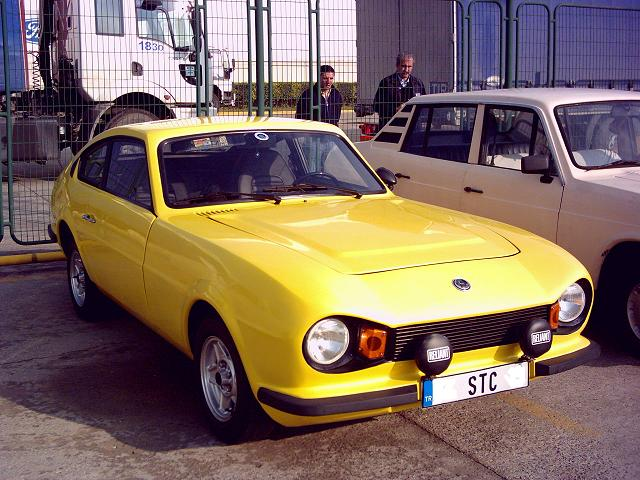
Anadol STC-16 (1973–1975) in characteristic Alanya Yellow

The STC-16 used a shortened and modified Anadol chassis and suspension system, while using a 1600 cc Ford Mexico engine. The transmission system, on the other hand, was the one that was used by some high performance Cortina and Capri models in the United Kingdom. The STC-16 had all the typical dashboard gauges and indicators which the British and Italian sports cars of that period had. Apart from the speed and rpm indicators, a resettable cruise distance indicator (something new for that period) as well as a Lucas ampermeter and Smiths oil, fuel and engine temperature indicators were installed on the dashboard.

Following an initial development period of 11 months, the first three prototypes of the STC-16 became ready for road tests, which took place at the Cengiz Topel Naval Air Station along the D.100 highway (back then known as the E-5 highway), in the town of Köseköy within Kocaeli Province. The first crash tests of the STC-16 were also performed in this period. Afterwards, the STC-16 was taken to England by Nihat Atasagun, Otosan's Production Manager, who tested the car at the MIRA circuit. The car received great attention at the streets and highways of England, where most people thought it was the prototype of a new British sports car. Several traffic police officers stopped the car in England, which had a special testing licence plate, "320-E", interested in finding out more information about the new model. The STC-16 was tested by British drivers at the circuit, and modifications were made according to their suggestions, following which the car's performance and safety characteristics were improved. Finally, at the beginning of April 1973, the first STC-16 rolled out of the Otosan factory in Istanbul and went into the showroom.

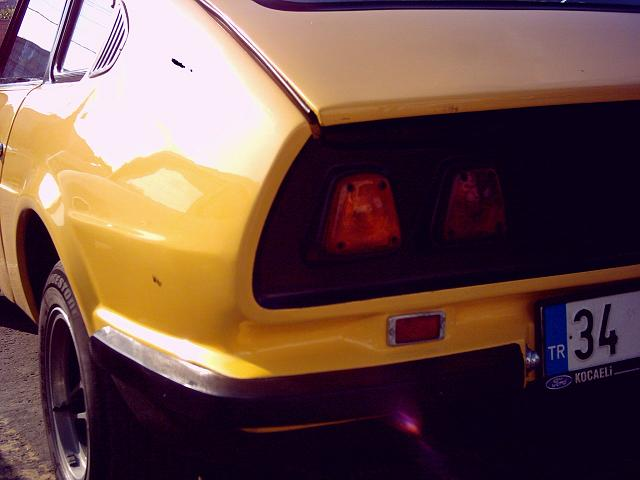
Anadol STC-16 rear detail

The global oil crisis of 1973 meant bad news for the STC-16. Not only car fuel became more expensive, but the cost of building fiberglass (which is a petrochemical product) car bodies such as that of the STC-16 also skyrocketed. The rear-wheel drive STC-16 had a relatively high fuel consumption, and the sports coupé market in Turkey appealed to a very small segment, particularly to the young members of high-income families. Unlike other Anadol models of that period which were sold for 50,000 to 55,000 Turkish Liras, the STC-16 had a price tag of more than 70,000 Turkish Liras. When all these factors came together, the primary customers of the STC-16 remained the rally drivers, sports car enthusiasts and young celebrities.

A total of 176 Anadol STC-16s have been produced between 1973 and 1975, the majority of them in 1973, until the global oil crisis in that year reduced demand and slowed down production. Most of the STC-16s were painted in "Alanya Yellow", which became synonymous with the car. Some of them were red with white racing stripes, and some white with blue racing stripes, as it was fashionable with the sports cars of that period.

=== Anadol STC-16 in motorsports ===
Instead of the heavy steel chassis of the road version STC-16, the rally version had a lightweight FRP chassis, combined with a modified 140 bhp (104 kW; 142 PS) engine.

The STC-16 became synonymous with its era in the memory of that period's Turkish youth, and the upgraded motorsports version of the car won numerous victories in rally competitions in Turkey and Europe. Famous Anadol rally drivers in the 1970s included Renç Koçibey, Demir Bükey, Romolo Marcopoli, İskender Aruoba, Cihat Gürkan, Ali Furgaç, Şevki Gökerman and Serdar Bostancı.

Anadol STC-16
| Engine | Displacement | Power | Torque | Wheelbase | L × W × H (cm) | Weight | Top speed | 0→100 km/h | Fuel cap. |
| OHC four-stroke inline-four "Ford", 1 single reversed carburettor | 1,599 cc (81 × 76.6 mm) | 68 PS (50 kW) at 5,200 rpm 142 PS (104 kW) (motorsports) | 11.8 kg⋅m (115.7 N⋅m) at 2,600 rpm | 228 cm | 398×164×128 | 920 kg | 160 km/h (99 mph) | 14.8 s |

== Anadol SV–1600 (1973–1982) ==
The SV–1600, which headed to the showrooms at the end of 1973, was the world's first fiberglass-bodied 5-door station wagon (estate) car. It had a completely different design and appearance than the 4-door Anadol models, and was inspired by Reliant's Scimitar sports-station coupé.

Several details of the car bore similarities with the station wagon designs of Bertone and Pininfarina in that period. The first examples of the SV–1600 had single-colour paint, while the front hood had a spoiler, which was something new for station cars.

After some time, a more luxurious version was produced, and bi-colour paint was applied, while new interiors were introduced. Starting from 1976, the SV-1600 received aluminium wheels, a new steering wheel, new side mirrors, and a single-colour paint with a black-and-white stripe on the sides. The car also had retractable seats for further enlarging the trunk space.

Production of the SV–1600 continued until 1982.

== Anadol Böcek (1975–1977) ==
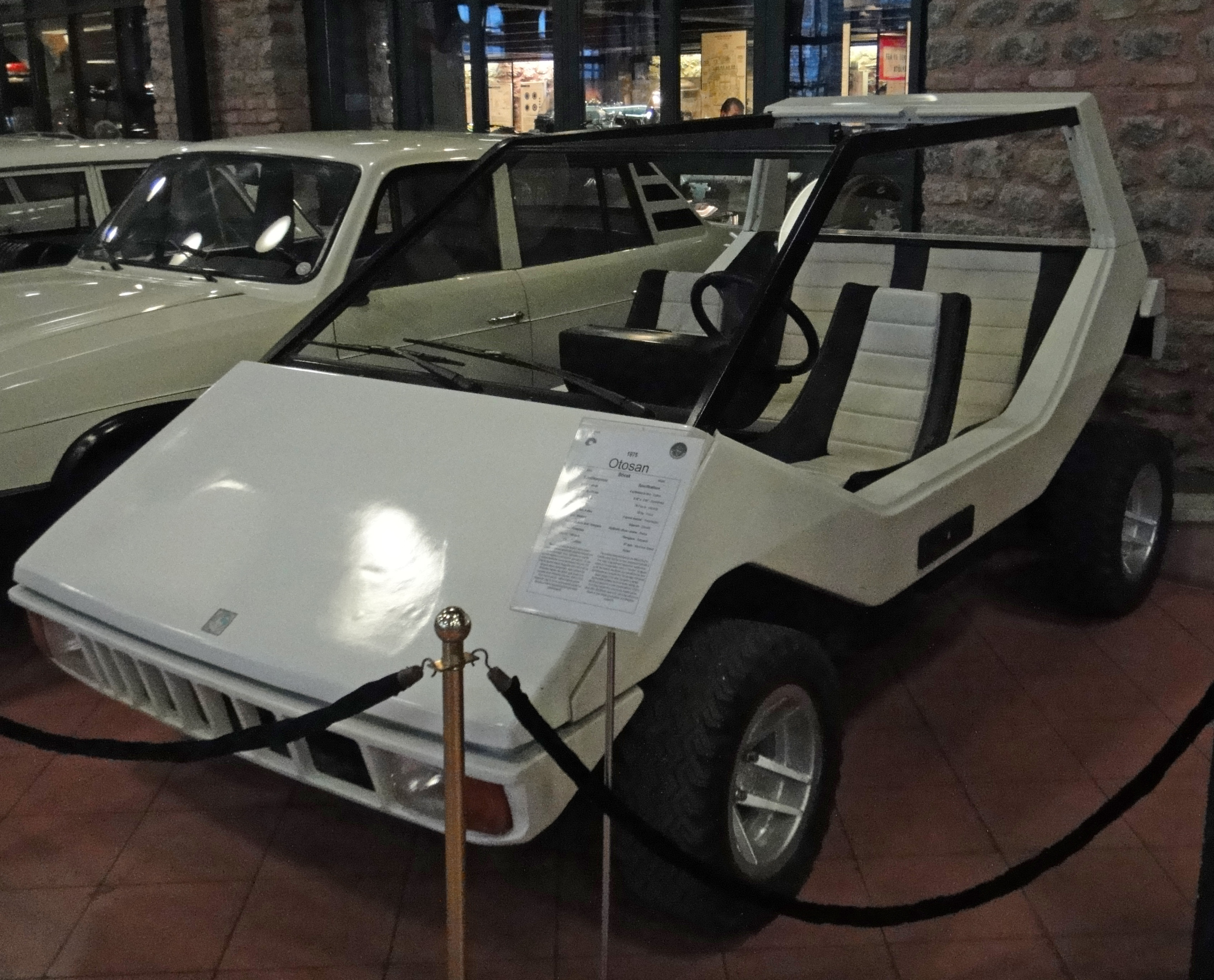
Anadol Böcek (1975–1977)

The Böcek (Bug) was designed by Jan Nahum, who worked at Otosan's Design and Development Department in this period. Later in his career, Nahum became the General Manager of major companies like Otokar and Tofaş, the Head of International Business Development at FIAT, and later yet the CEO of Petrol Ofisi. Jan Nahum's father, Bernar Nahum, played an important role in the establishment of the Anadol factory and the development of the Anadol A1. Another close family relative, Claude (Klod) Nahum, was an Anadol A1 rally racer, as well as the developer of the Otosan Anadol Wankel engine. He is currently a founding partner of the KIRAÇA Group of Companies, which also includes KARSAN Automotive Industries.

Böcek made it to the showrooms in 1975. The vehicle, similar in appearance to a fiberglass dune buggy but different in design concept and characteristics, was developed upon request for a similar vehicle by the Turkish Armed Forces. Otosan also predicted that the rising popularity of Turkey's tourism and beach resorts would guarantee a certain level of demand for a civilian-use version of such a vehicle. The Böcek's roof could be opened, it didn't have any doors, and its windshield had the same inclination as the hood. The futuristic front panel and gauges of the Böcek were ahead of their time, and were used many years later by future passenger vehicles in Europe.

The Böcek had a 1298 cc 63 bhp (47 kW; 64 PS) Ford engine, which provided very good performance given the vehicle's small dimensions. In line with the pop-art designs of that period, the Böcek had asymmetrical front and rear ends. The front grille was asymmetrical, while in the rear, there were 3 lights at the left and 2 at the right. The rearview mirror, which was formed of five differently angled mirrors which provided a telescopic view, was mounted on top of the windshield. The front tyres were 225*55*13 in dimension, while the seats were fiberglass covered with vinyl.

Several different versions of the Böcek (Bug) were designed for institutional and civilian use. There was a version with gull-wing doors, a version for the Turkish Radio and Television Corporation (TRT) which was optimized for using film and video cameras, an off road version, a tractor/trailer version, and a military version.

The Böcek was a design concept that was ahead of its time, but just like the STC-16, it was not a great seller due to the economic situation in Turkey and the rest of the world in that period, caused mostly by the 1973 oil crisis. Only 203 examples of the Böcek were produced between 1975 and 1977.

== Anadol A8-16/16 SL (1981–1984) ==
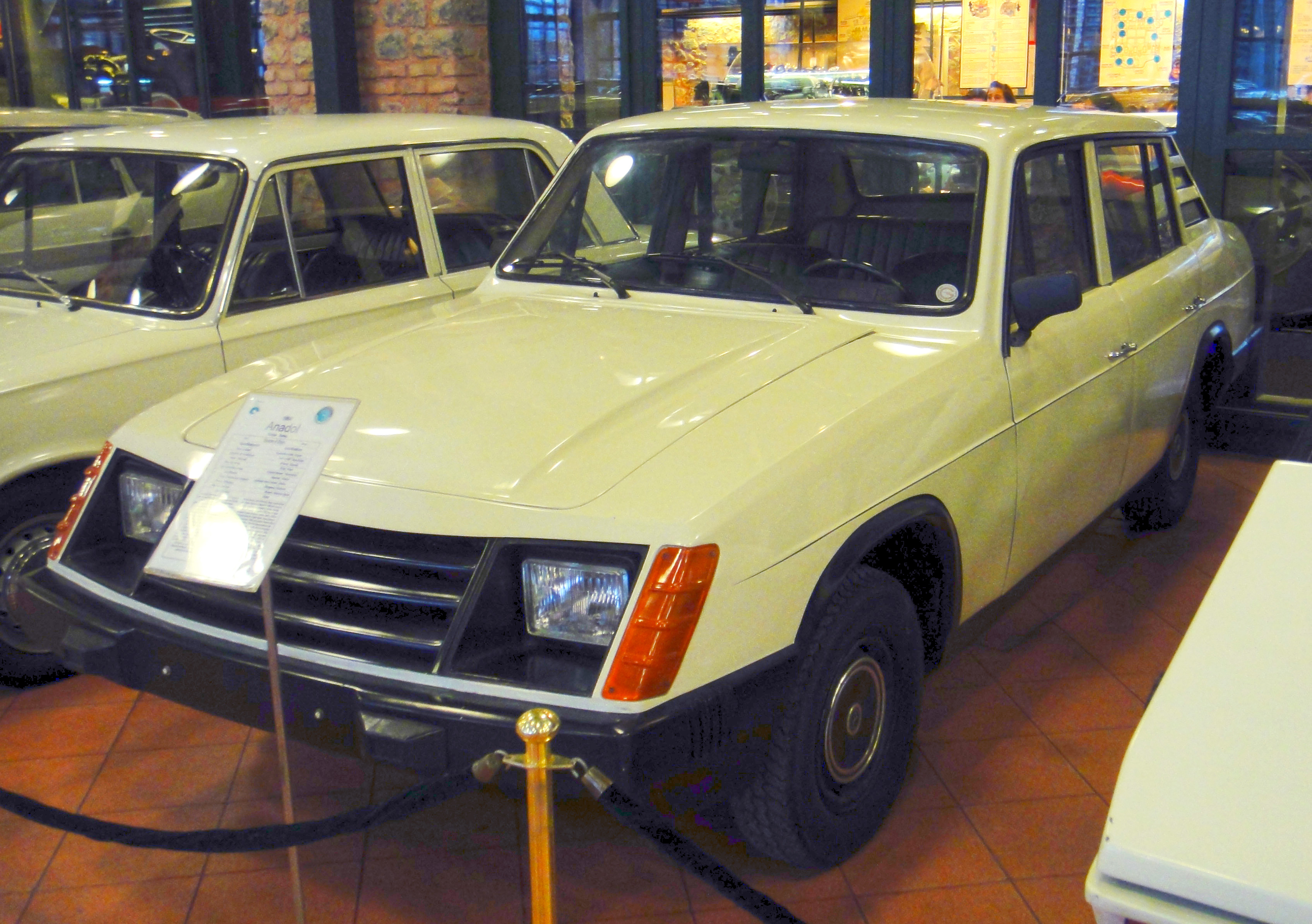
Anadol A8-16 (1981–1984)

Production of the 4-door, 5-seat A8-16 series began in 1981. The design concept of the A8-16 was largely inspired by the Volvo and Saab models of the 1970s, including the groundbreaking Volvo VESC (1972) safety concept car and the first generation Saab 900 (1978), with futuristic details such as the large headlamps, inclined nose and the high-positioned rear trunk. However, it also had details that appeared obsolete in 1981, such as the rear lights which were originally used in the Anadol Böcek, but didn't look good on the A8-16. The interior design and the materials used also did not please the traditional Anadol customers. Many of the design characteristics, especially the door windows and frames, were borrowed from older Anadol models such as the SV-1600 which was designed in 1973, and most potential customers saw this car as a hotchpotch of old Anadol spare parts, mixed with some new ideas. The new body still sat on a box-type perimeter frame with crossmembers, an independent coil spring front suspension and a live, leaf spring rear axle. Steering is rack and pinion, transmission by the way of a four-speed manual.

Even the higher performance 1.6 Pinto E-Max engine, which was used in the first A8-16s that were produced between 1981 and 1982, could not improve the popularity of these cars. As a result, in order to reduce production costs, this engine was no longer used in the A8-16 SL models of 1983–1984 which reverted to the older 1.6 engine. Only 1,013 examples of the A8-16 were produced between 1981 and 1984.

Anadol A8-16 SL
| Engine | Displacement | Power | Torque | Wheelbase | L × W × H (mm) | Weight | Top speed | 0→100 km/h | Fuel cap. |
| OHC four-stroke inline-four "Ford Pinto", 1 single barrel Motorcraft carburettor | 1,593 cc (87.65 × 66.0 mm) | 78 PS (57 kW) at 5,200 rpm | 125 N⋅m (12.7 kg⋅m) at 2,700 rpm | 2,565 mm | 4,510×1,645×1,410 | 945 kg | 145 km/h (90 mph) | 16.0 s | 39 L |

== Anadol prototypes (1977–1986) ==
=== Wankel engine ===
Otosan Design and Development Department employed many talented engineers, such as Claude (Klod) Nahum, who led the group which developed a Wankel engine that could produce more than 100 PS (74 kW) despite its small size. But due to its high development costs and the well-known problematic character of Wankel engines, this engine was not used in Anadol's models. Today, one of these Wankel engines is displayed at the Rahmi M. Koç Museum in Istanbul.

=== FW 11 ===
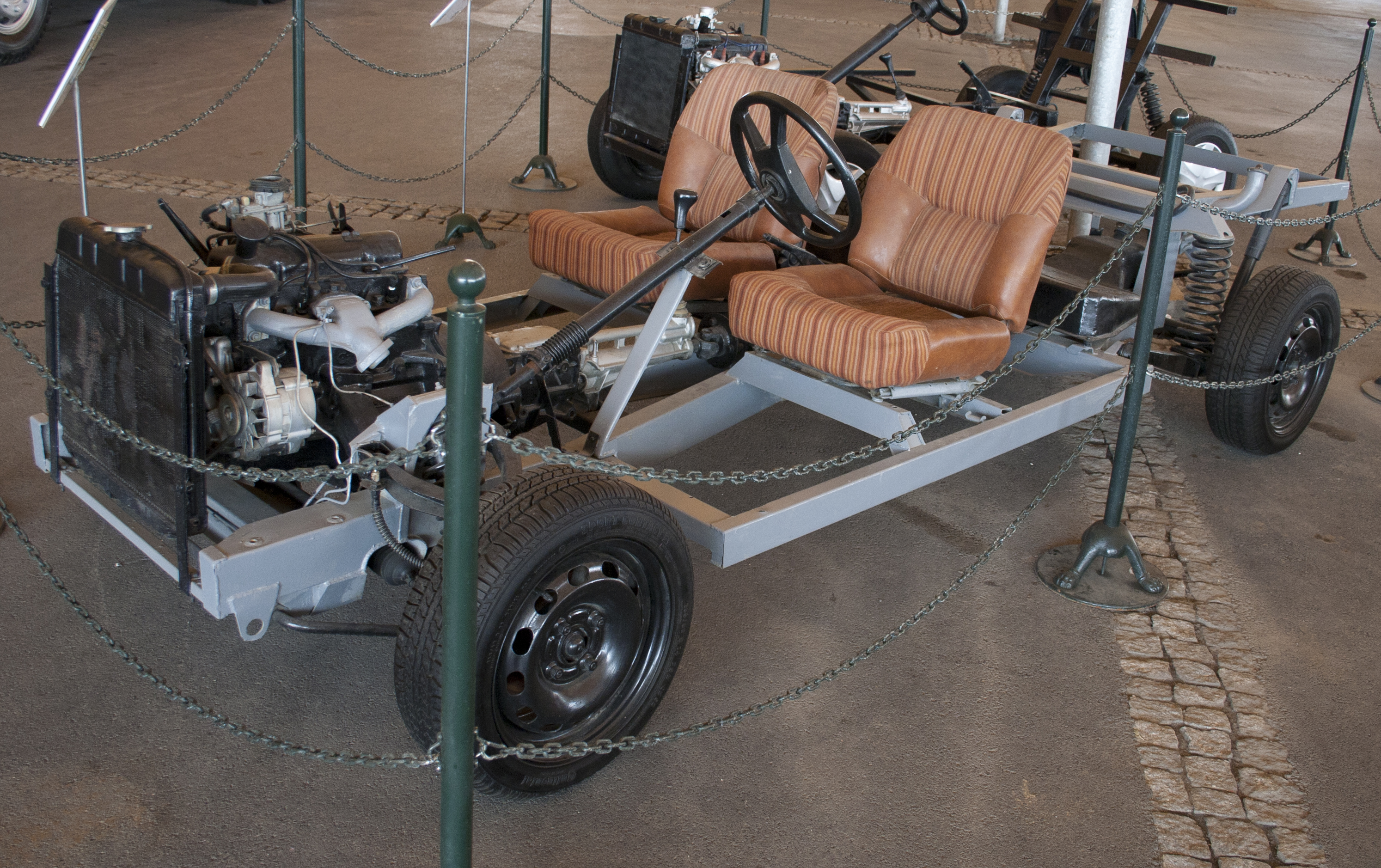
Chassis of the Anadol FW11 (1977) prototype, on display at the Rahmi M. Koç Museum in Istanbul.

In 1977 Marcello Gandini designed the FW 11 for Anadol and Reliant, the latter naming it as the Scimitar SE 7. Four prototypes of this car were produced, two of which remained in England with Reliant badging, and two other examples, one of them white and the other one blue, were sent to Turkey with the Anadol badge. The car, which had a modern design and "luxuries" for that period's European cars such as electric windows, was deemed too expensive to produce profitably by Anadol and the project was shelved. The two Anadol prototypes were held in Koç Holding's (which owns Otosan) depot in Istanbul's Acıbadem district for nearly 25 years. Since 2004 one of them is occasionally displayed at the Rahmi M. Koç Museum in Istanbul.

One of the other prototypes, the Reliant Scimitar SE 7, is currently displayed in England. Following Anadol's decision not to build the FW 11, Reliant exhibited the Scimitar SE 7 at its stand as a prototype during the Birmingham Motor Show.

The FW 11's overall design themes were recycled by Gandini for the Citroën BX, premiered in 1982.

=== Çağdaş ===
During the late 1970s, Jan Nahum developed several prototypes and worked on new Anadol designs. Many of these new prototypes, which even included full-scale models, however, could not be mass-produced.

Otosan, in that period, aimed at creating modern cars, in line with the developments of the automotive industry worldwide, while reducing the amount of fiberglass which it used for building the body parts of its vehicles. To meet this demand, Jan Nahum designed and built two different prototypes of the Anadol Çağdaş (meaning Contemporary). The bodywork of Çağdaş was made of fiberglass parts fitted on a steel skeleton. The Wankel engine developed by Claude (Klod) Nahum was installed on it.

Çağdaş won the top prize of the Turkish State Fine Arts Academy in Istanbul in the industrial design category, and Jan Nahum received the award from Prof. Dr. Önder Küçükerman.

Turkish newspapers made detailed coverage of the car, stating that production would begin either in 1980 or 1981. However, due to the political, social and economic instability in the country, the project could never be realized.

A single prototype of Çağdaş is today displayed at the Rahmi M. Koç Museum in Istanbul.

=== A9 ===
The A9, designed by Bertone in 1982, was the last prototype of Anadol. It was a 4-door sedan with a very modern design for the early 1980s. The rear parts of the car resembled the future Peugeot 405, while the overall form resembled the Volvo sedans of the mid-1980s. A new and more contemporary-looking Anadol logo was developed for the A9.

The design of the wheels were also characteristic of the European cars of the mid to late 1980s.

However, the A9 couldn't make it to full mass-production and the prototype was destroyed.

Anadol subsequently ceased to exist as a car brand in 1986, as the Otosan factory began producing Ford Motor Company's passenger car models.

== Anadol models ==
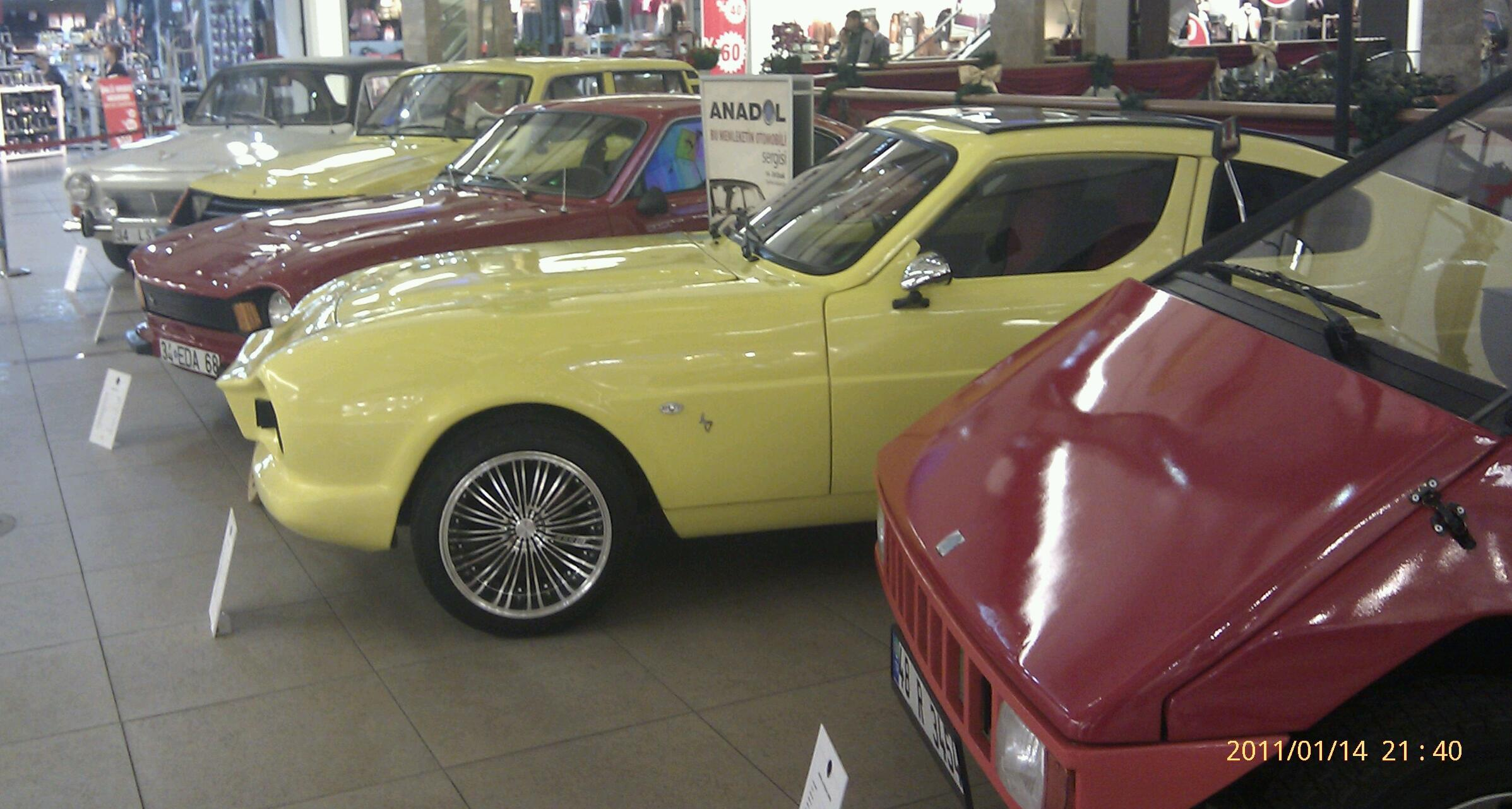
Many of the Anadol models together, including STC-16 and Böcek

=== Production models ===
- A1 (1966–1975): 19,724 produced
- A2 (1970–1981): 35,668 produced
- STC-16 (1973–1975): 176 produced
- SV-1600 (1973–1982): 6,499 produced
- Böcek (1975–1977): 203 produced
- A8-16/16 SL (1981–1984): 1,013 produced
- Otosan 500 Pick-Up (1971–1991): 36,892 produced

=== Prototypes ===
- FW11 (1977)
- Çağdaş (1979)
- A9 (1982)
