= Anziel Nova =

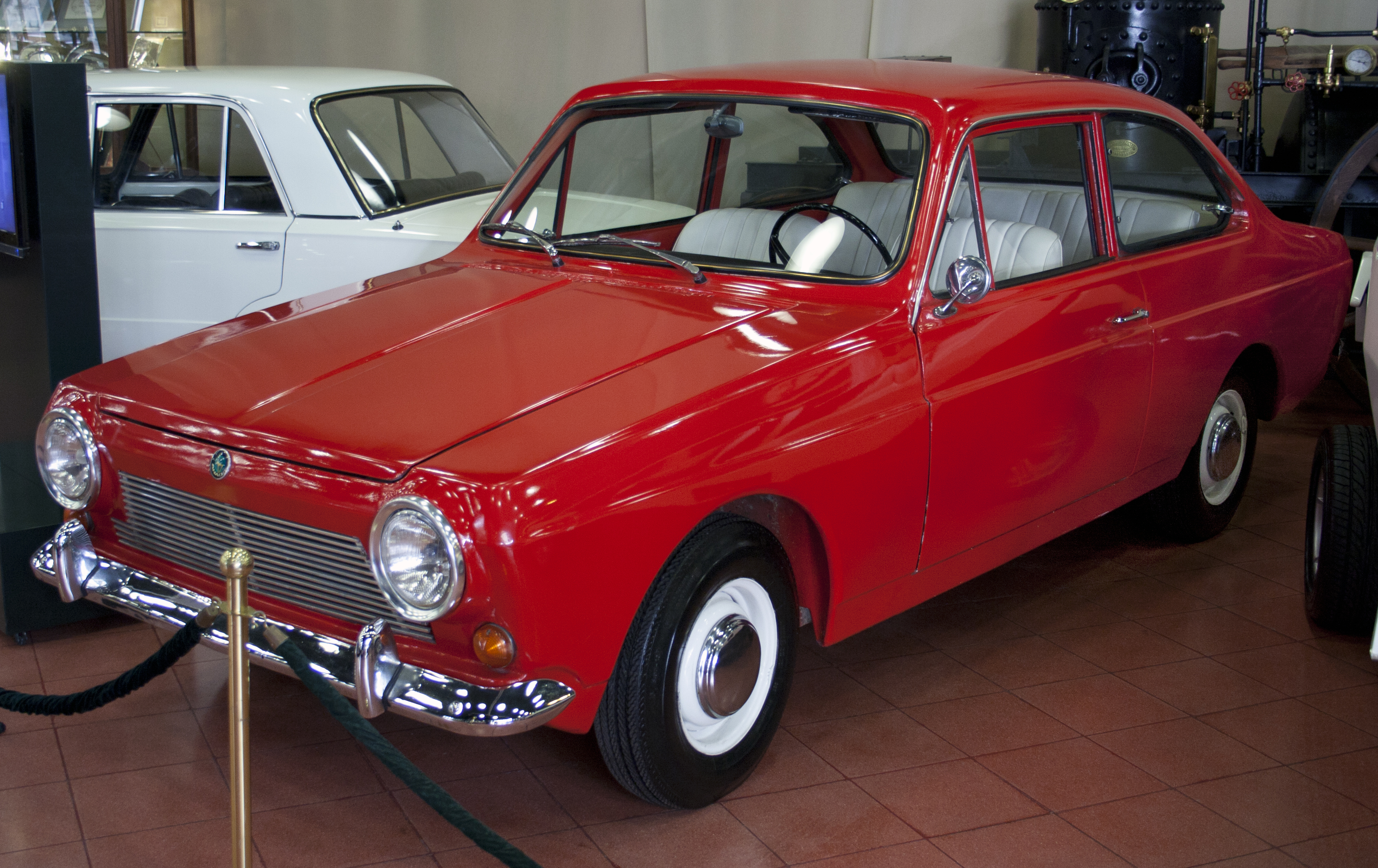
- A 1966 Anadol A1, on which the Anziel Nova was based, at the Rahmi M. Koç Museum in Istanbul

Overview
- Manufacturer: Anziel Manufacturing
- Production: 1967; 1 prototype
- Designer: Ogle

Body and chassis
- Class: Mid-size; Large family car
- Body style: 2-door saloon
- Layout: FR layout
- Related: Anadol A1; Reliant FW5

Powertrain
- Engine: 1,498 cc (1.5 L) Ford Kent Inline-four engine
- Transmission: 4-Speed Manual gearbox

Dimensions
- Wheelbase: 2,565 mm (101.0 in)
- Length: 4,381 mm (172.5 in)
- Width: 1,644 mm (64.7 in)
- Height: 1,422 mm (56.0 in)
- Curb weight: > 828 kg (1,825.4 lb)

The Anziel Nova was meant to be New Zealand's first domestically produced car. A prototype of the fibre-glass bodied car was unveiled in September 1967, however never reached production.

== Background ==
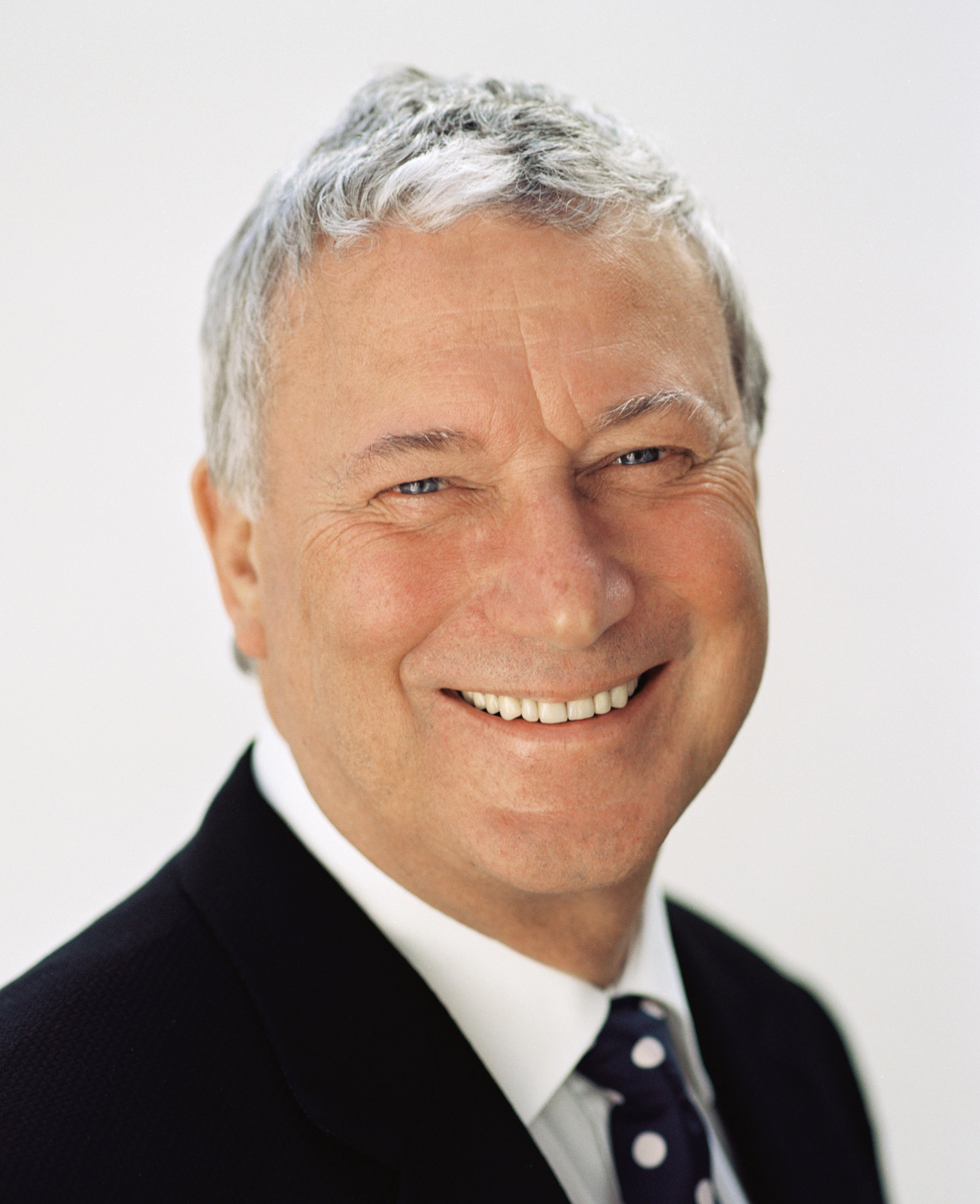
Alan Gibbs

In 1965 Alan Gibbs, then an economist, had returned from England with the idea of creating a New Zealand made car. However, he initially worked for the Government's Department of Prime Minister and Cabinet on the Import Licensing schedule. This experience gave him a good understanding of the problems a start-up venture would face.

The project commenced in Autumn 1966 when Alan moved to Auckland to join with his brother Ian, owner of Anziel Limited, in the venture. The Gibbs brothers also needed an import licence for the assembly plant, parts, and materials. Because of its use of fibreglass bodywork Reliant Motor Co of England was approached for a suitable design. This was to maximise the quantity of local product in the manufacture.

At the time Reliant was developing the FW5, a mid-range family saloon, for Otosan of Turkey. The FW5 was aimed at relatively low production numbers without the need for expensive plant and tooling. It was designed by Tom Karen of Ogle Design. Reliant considered the model suitable for construction in less developed countries because of the ease of manufacture. This car was deemed suitable to meet the Gibbs' requirements.

== The proposal ==
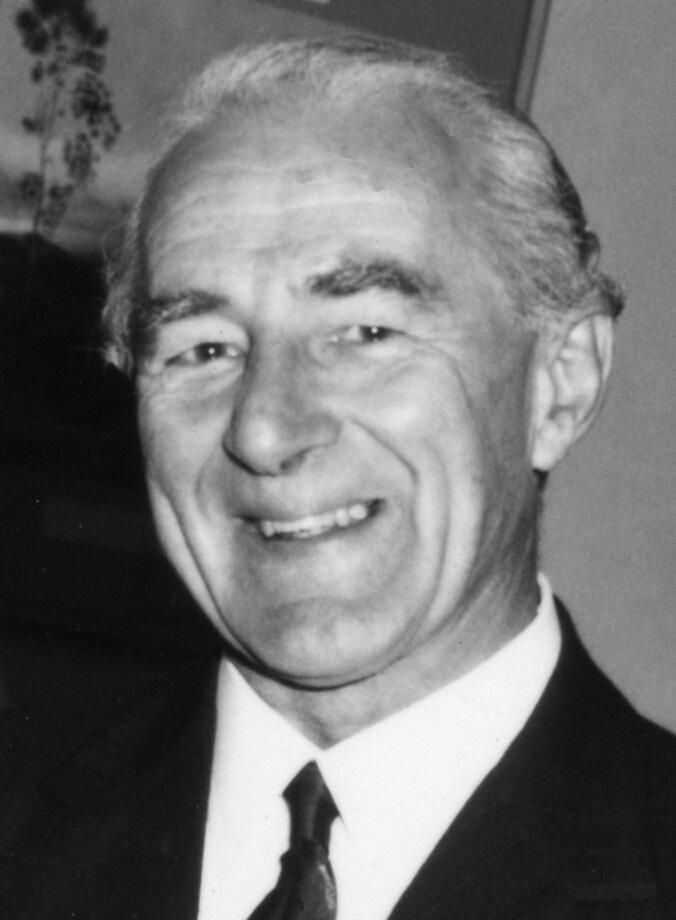
Jack Marshall

In August 1966, the Gibbs brothers sought government consent to obtain an import licence for their proposal. They proposed to build 3,000 cars per annum, with production commencing in mid-1968. However, Jack Marshall, who was the Minister of Trade in that period, declined the request on the grounds that New Zealand was suffering from falling export revenues at the time, which was causing a balance of trade problem for the government. Other established car manufacturers were having their import licences reduced and the granting of a licence to another manufacturer was seen as counter-productive.

Despite this setback, the Gibbs brothers continued to lobby Marshall, who eventually relented and allowed them a licence to import a prototype from Reliant.

== The car ==
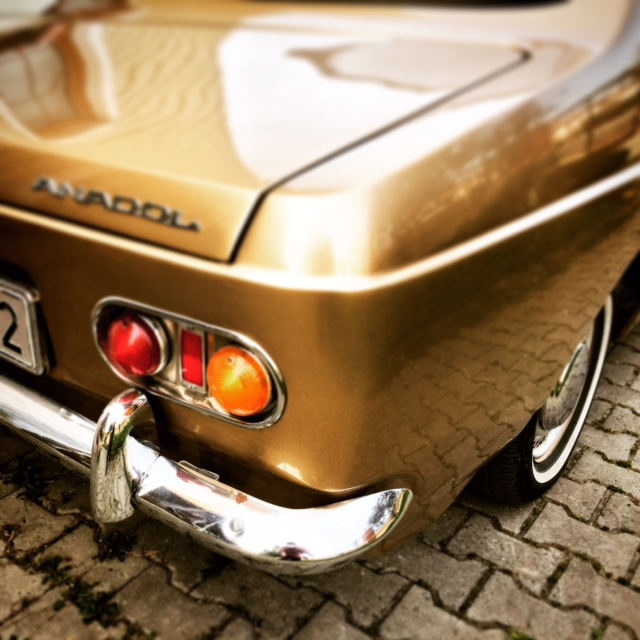
Rear view of an Anadol A1

On 16 December 1966, Otosan had begun production of the FW5, naming it the Anadol A1. Whether it was an FW5 or an A1 that the Gibbs brothers obtained as their prototype is unknown, as either source could have been used. Given the probable higher import duties on non-United Kingdom sourced vehicles it is more likely that it was a Reliant FW5. The car arrived in New Zealand in the winter of 1967.

As the Anziel Nova, the two-door car was to be powered by a 1498cc pre-crossflow Ford Kent engine with a 4-speed gearbox. It had an expected top speed of 90 mph (140 km/h). Alterations were made to its trim and the car was re-badged by the Gibbs brothers prior to its unveiling. In the publicity documents the company said that it was going to produce a four-door version, as well as planning to make a station wagon, commercial van, and a light truck.

The prototype is still in existence and owned by Alan Gibbs.

== Promotion and stonewall ==
The Gibbs brothers brought in Sir Laurence Hartnett, who was considered the father of the Australian car industry, to promote the car at an official announcement on 17 September 1967. The car was said to be going to sell for NZ$2,400. This would have placed the car in a price range in New Zealand with cars that included the Hillman Hunter (NZ$2,232), Toyota Corona (NZ$2,296), and Isuzu Bellett 1500 (NZ$2,398). Its advantage over these models was that its higher local content meant a reduced need for overseas funds.

Jack Marshall and Norman Shelton, Minister of Customs, were less than enthusiastic about the project. They considered that the country at that time could ill afford to spend its overseas funds on such a project, but would continue to consider it. Discussions continued in the following year with no real change. By the end of 1968 the government offered a licence for 600 units, but this was insufficient. Through 1969 there were ongoing battles with the government but no progress. Even obtaining funds for paying a fee for Reliant's technical assistance was declined. The project was finally doomed in March 1970, due to the changes made by the government on import rules for cheaper, fully built cars.

Alan Gibbs retained his interest in cars and went on to develop the Gibbs Aquada in 2003.
