= Citroën BX =

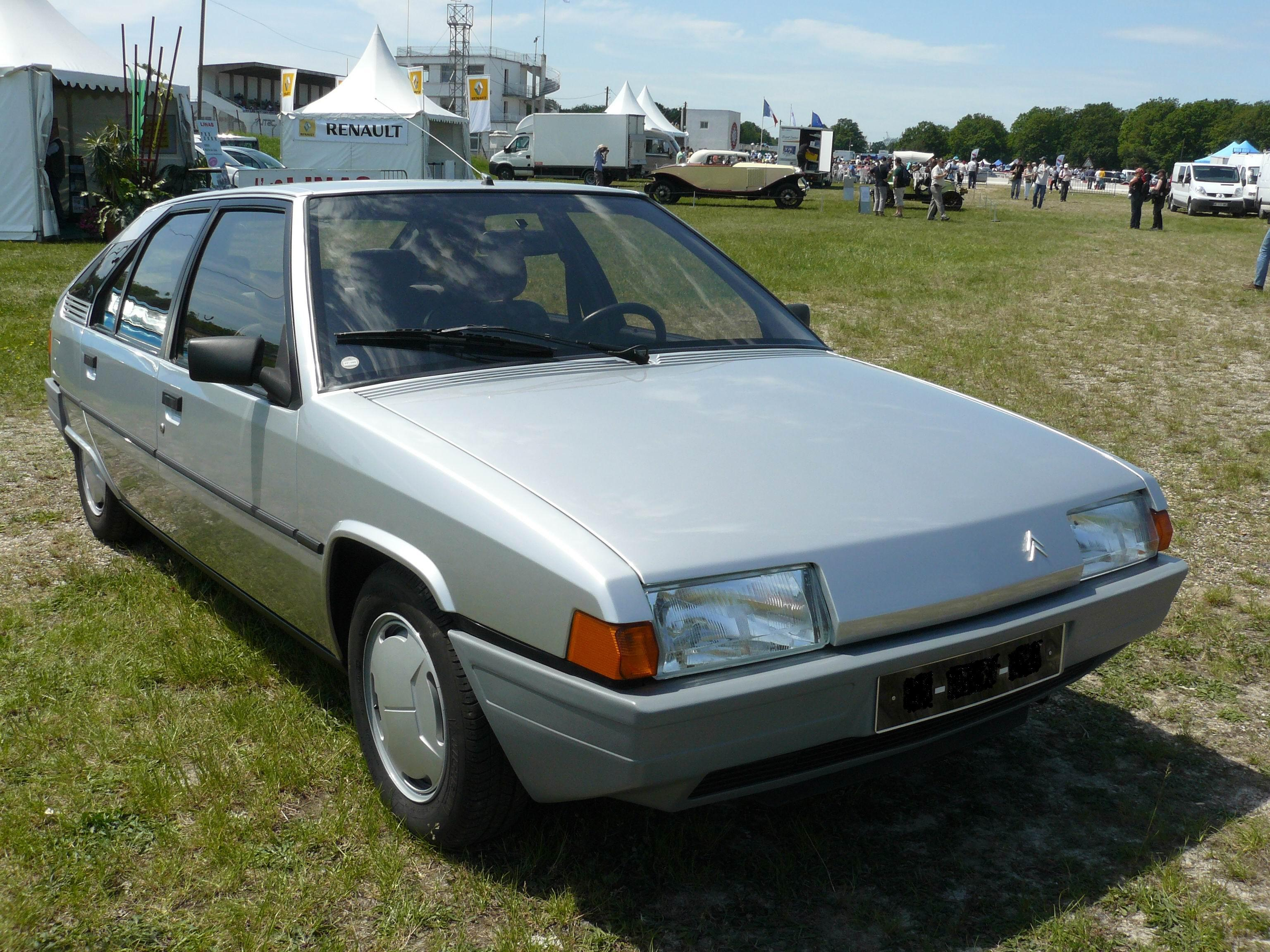

Overview
- Manufacturer: Citroën
- Production: 1982–1994
- Assembly: France: Rennes (PSA Rennes Plant); France: Cerizay (Heuliez: BX Break); Spain: Vigo (PSA Vigo Plant); Yugoslavia: Koper (Cimos); Morocco: Casablanca (Sopriam); Uruguay: Montevideo (Nordex S.A.)
- Designer: Marcello Gandini

Body and chassis
- Class: Large family car (D)
- Body style: 5-door estate; 5-door hatchback
- Layout: Front-engine, transverse front-wheel drive / longitudinal four-wheel drive
- Related: Peugeot 405

Powertrain
- Engine: 1124 cc XW I4; 1360 cc XY I4; 1360 cc TU3 I4; 1580 cc XU5 I4; 1905 cc XU9 I4; 1905 cc XU9 J4 16V I4; 2142 cc N9TE 16V turbo I4 (BX 4TC); 1769 cc XUD7 diesel I4; 1769 cc XUD7TE turbodiesel I4; 1905 cc XUD9 diesel I4
- Transmission: 5-speed manual; 4-speed ZF 4HP14 automatic

Dimensions
- Wheelbase: 2,655 mm (104.5 in)
- Length: 4,230 mm (166.5 in) (hatchback)
- Width: 1,660 mm (65.4 in)
- Height: 1,361 mm (53.6 in)
- Kerb weight: 870 kg (1,918 lb) - 1,220 kg (2,690 lb)

Chronology
- Predecessor: Citroën GS; Simca 1307
- Successor: Citroën Xantia

The Citroën BX is a large family car which was produced by the French manufacturer Citroën from 1982 to 1994. In total, 2,315,739 BXs were built during its 12-year history. The hatchback was discontinued in 1993 with the arrival of the Xantia, but the estate continued for another year. The BX was designed to be lightweight, using particularly few body parts, including many made from plastics.

== History ==
The Citroën BX was announced in June 1982, but its commercial life really only began in the Autumn of that year, with a Paris presentation on 2 October 1982 under the Eiffel Tower. The BX was designed to replace the successful small family car Citroën GS/GSA that was launched in 1970, with a larger vehicle (although the GSA continued until 1986). The French advertising campaign used the slogan "J'aime, j'aime, j'aime" showing the car accompanied by music written specially by Julien Clerc. The British advertising campaign used the slogan "Loves Driving, Hates Garages", reflecting the effort of Citroën to promote the reduced maintenance costs of the BX, over the higher than average maintenance costs of the technologically advanced GS/GSA; while still performing in the Citroën style on the road.

The angular hatchback was designed by Marcello Gandini of Bertone, based on his unused design for the British 1977 Reliant FW11 concept and his 1979 Volvo Tundra concept car. It was the second car to benefit from the merger of Peugeot and Citroën in 1976, the first being the Citroën Visa launched in 1978. The BX shared its platform with the more conventional 405 that appeared in 1987, except the rear suspension which is from a Peugeot 305 Break. Among the features that set the car apart from the competition was the traditional Citroën hydropneumatic self-levelling suspension, extensive use of plastic body panels (bonnet, tailgate, bumpers), and front and rear disc brakes.

The BX was launched onto the right-hand drive UK market in August 1983, initially only with 1.4 and 1.6 petrol engines, although by 1986 it had been joined by more engine options as well as a five-door estate model. The BX enjoyed a four-year run as the UK's best selling diesel engine car from 1987, and was one of the most popular foreign-built cars there during the second half of the 1980s. However, just 485 examples were remaining on Britain's roads by February 2016.

The BX dispensed with the air cooled, flat four engine which powered the GS, and replaced it with the new PSA group XY, TU and XU series of petrol engines in 1360 cc, 1580 cc and, from 1984, 1905 cc displacements. A 1124 cc engine, very unusual in a car of this size, was also available in countries where car tax was a direct function of engine capacity, such as Ireland, Italy, Portugal and Greece. The 1.1 and 1.4 models used the PSA X engine (known widely as the "Douvrin" or "Suitcase Engine"), the product of an earlier Peugeot/Renault joint venture, and already fitted in the Peugeot 104 and Renault 14. The 1.6 version was the first car to use the all-new short-stroke XU-series engine. It was produced in a new engine plant at Trémery built specifically for this purpose, and was later introduced in a larger 1.9-litre version and saw long service in a variety of Peugeots and Citroëns. The XUD diesel engine version was launched in November 1983. The diesel and turbo diesel models were to become the most successful variants, they were especially popular as estates and became the best selling diesel car in Britain in the late 1980s.

The petrol engines were badged as 11, 14, 16, 19 — signifying engine size (with the exception of the 17 diesel model, which was actually a 1769 cc, 1.8-liter unit). In some countries, a weaker, 80 hp (59 kW) DIN version of the 1.6 L engine was badged as the BX15 instead of BX16. The rather underpowered 1.1 L engine with engine code H1A was installed in the BX 11E/TE for the Italian, Greek, and Portuguese markets specifically. It was fitted from 1988 to 1993 and produces 55 hp (40 kW) DIN at 5800 rpm.

A year after the launch of the hatchback model, an estate version ("Break", "Evasion") was made available. The Breaks were all built by Heuliez at their recently updated plant in Cerizay. In 1984 power steering became optional, welcome particularly in the diesel models. In the late 1980s, a four-wheel drive system and turbodiesel engines were introduced.

The majority of BX built received a five-speed manual transmission. A four-speed automatic by ZF was introduced as an option on the 16 RS and TRS in July 1984, and added to the 19 TRD in February 1986. In July 1988, the automatic became an available option on the 19 GTI and the TRi/TZi Break (the precise models vary in some markets).

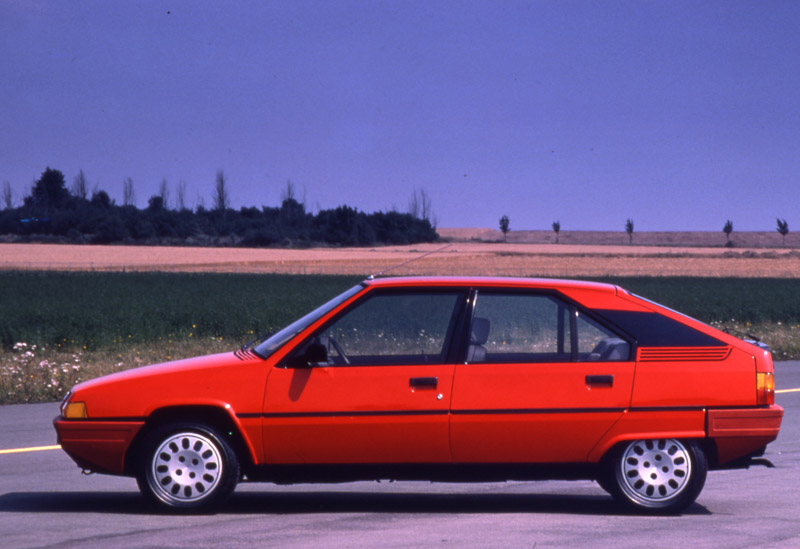
Citroën BX side view (pre-facelift)

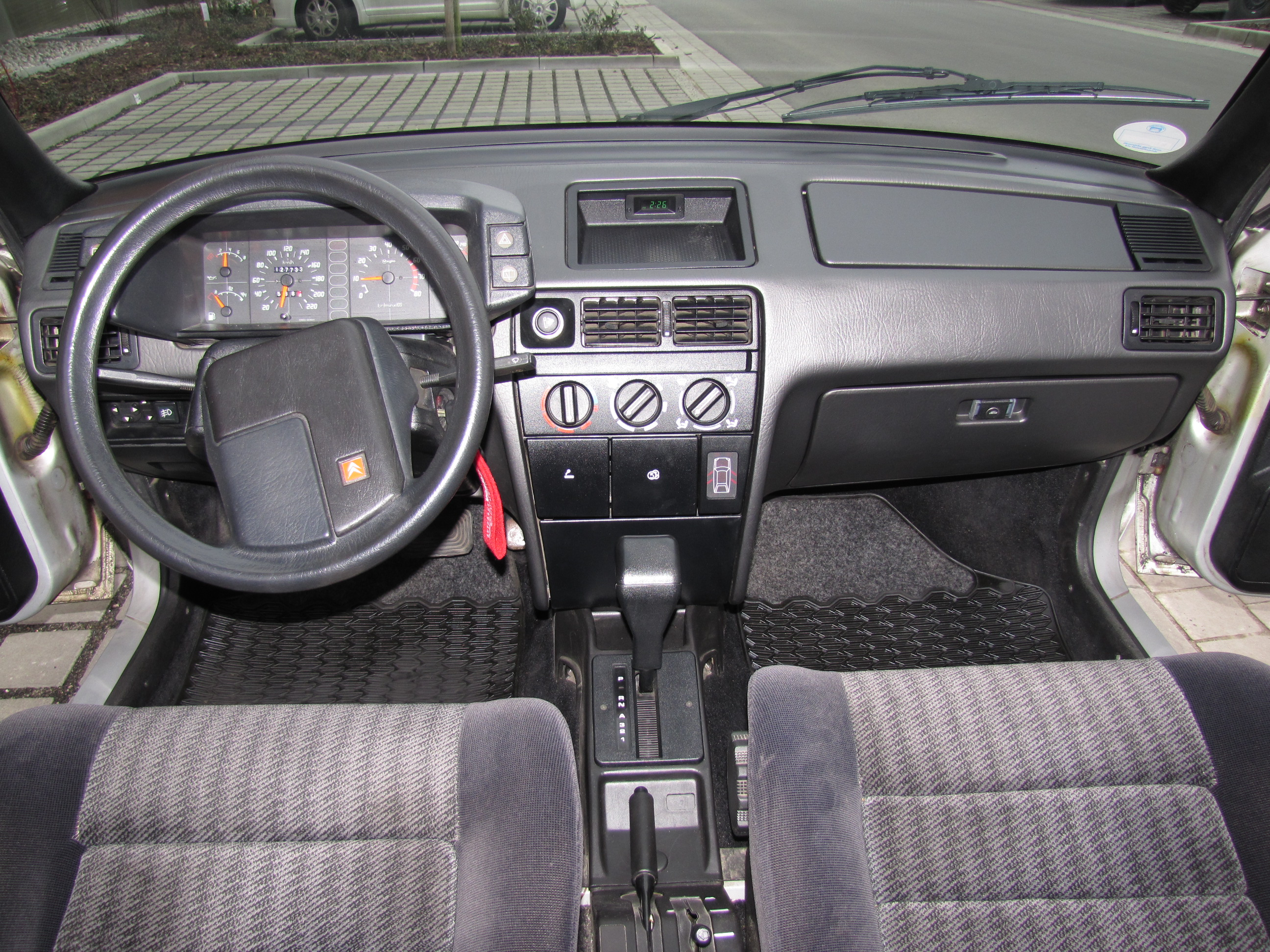
Citroën BX GTi interior

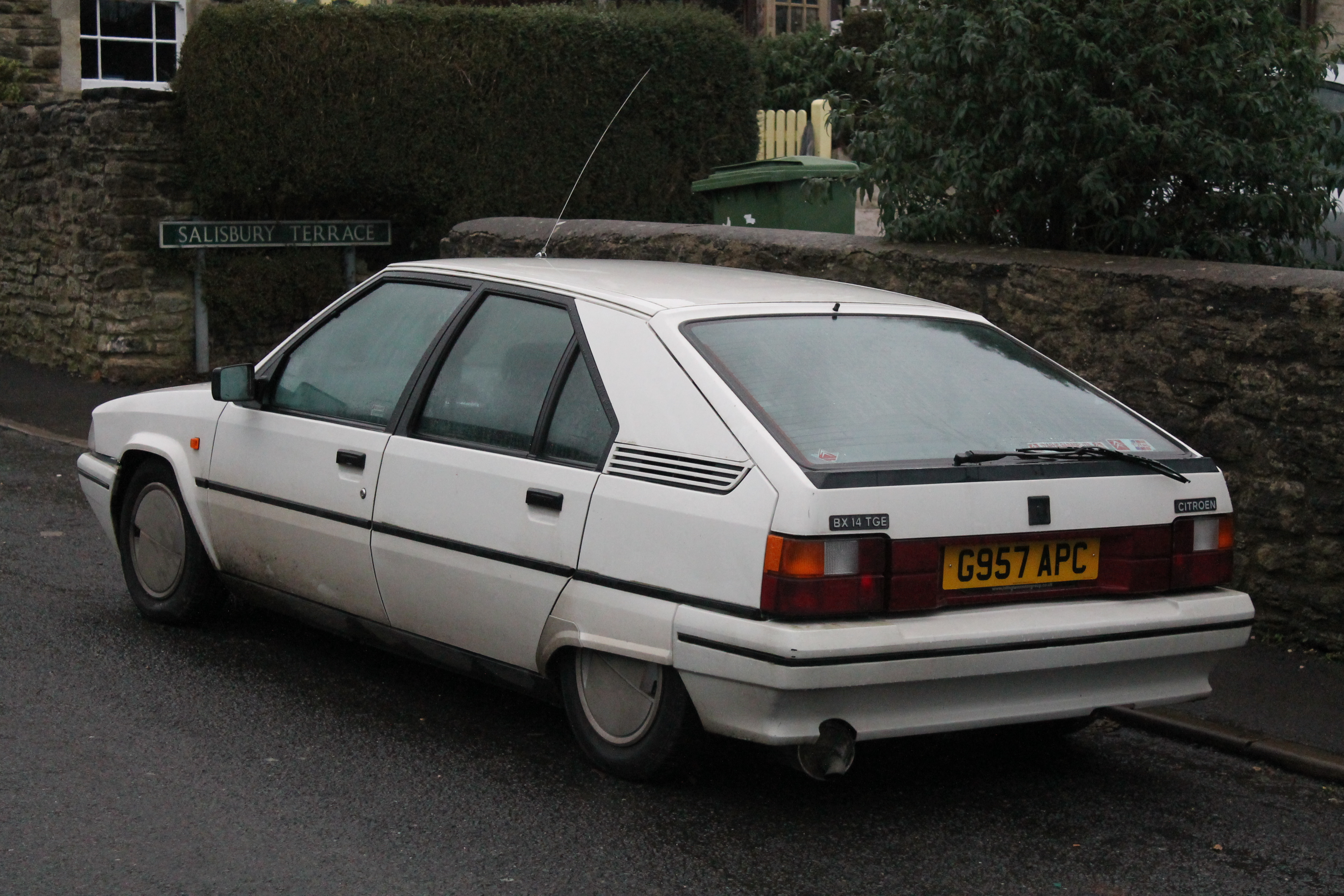
Citroën BX 14TGE (Phase II facelift; UK)

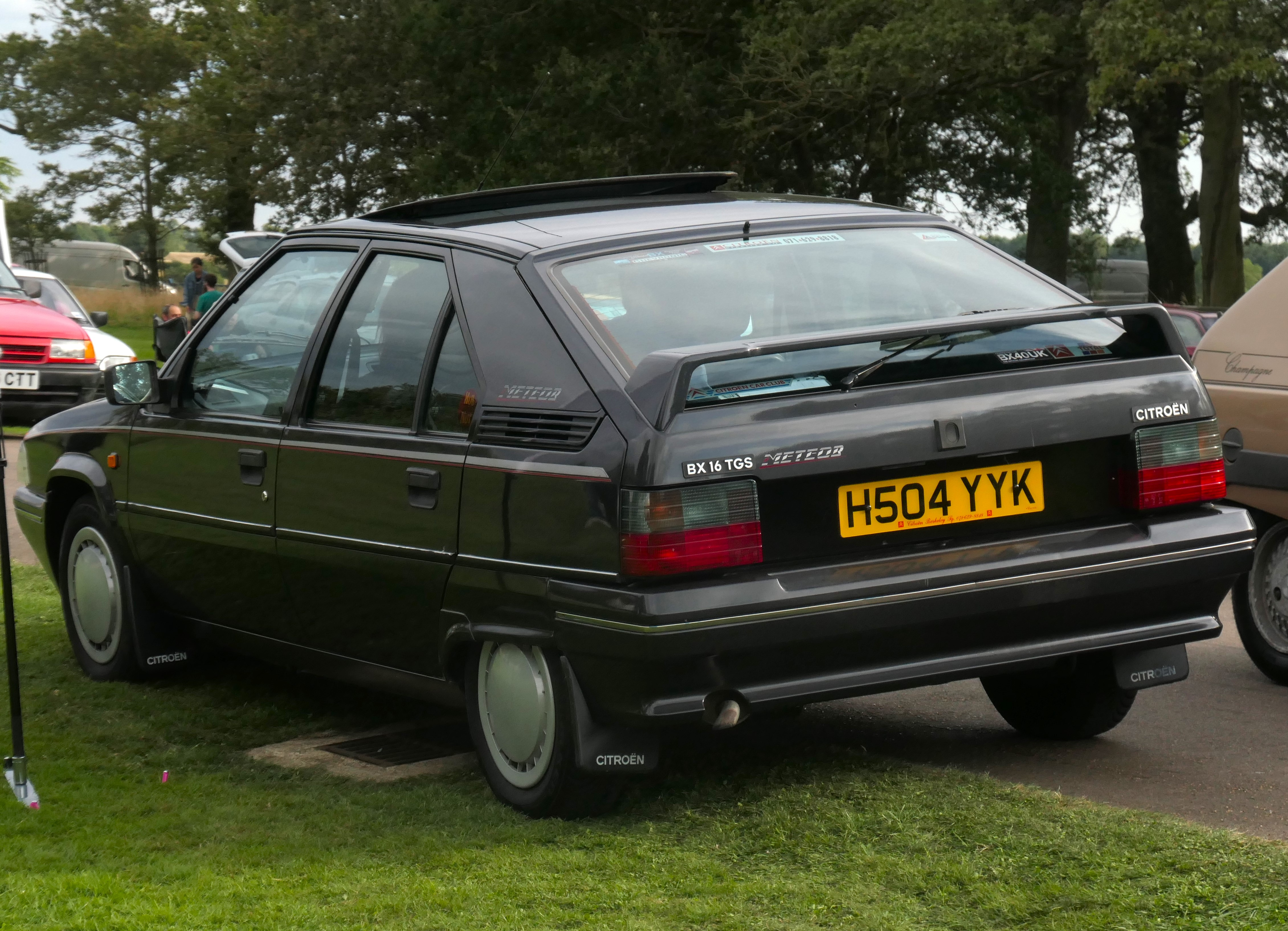
Citroën BX 16TGS (Phase II facelift; UK)

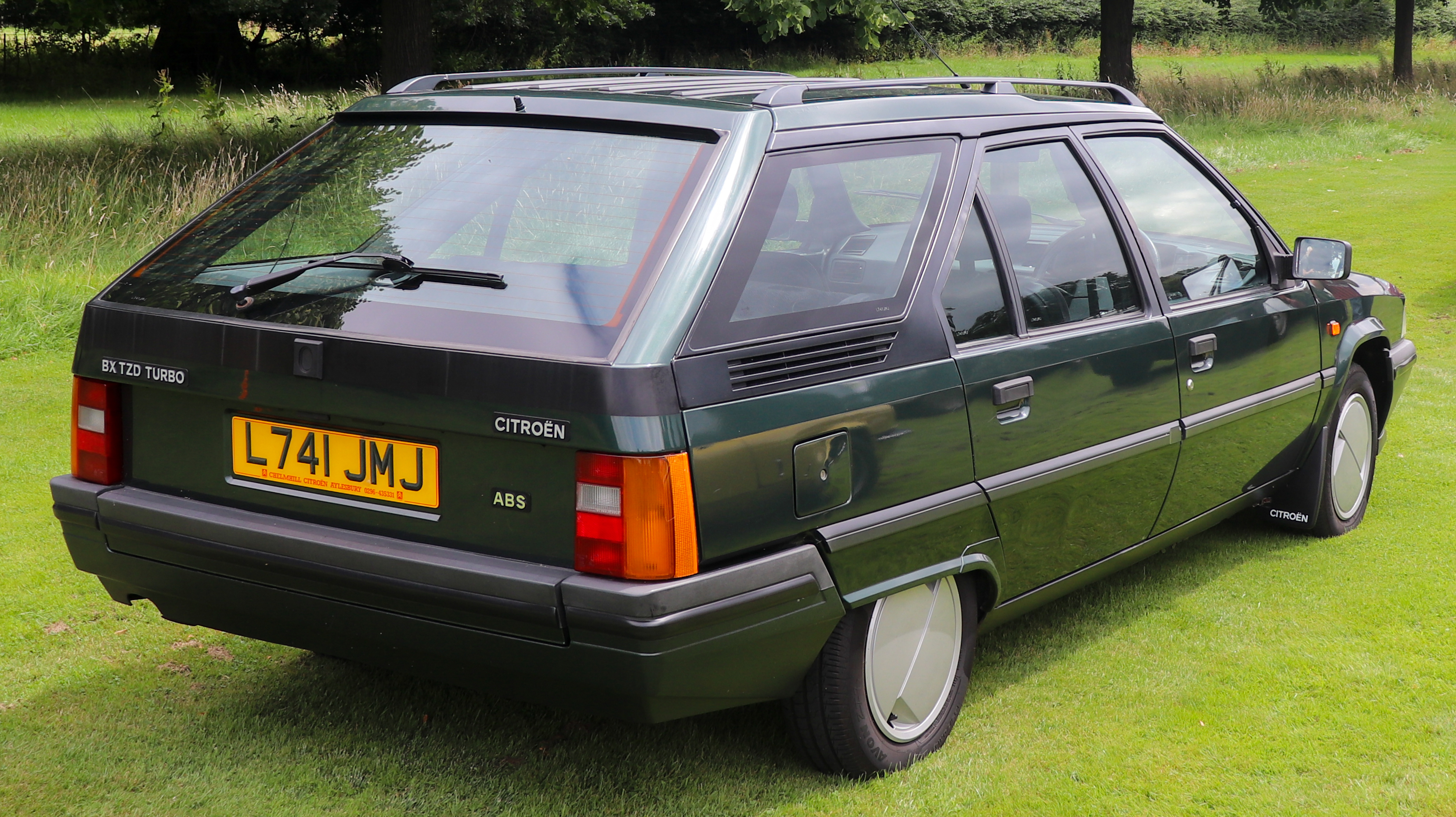
Facelift Citroën BX Break (estate)

=== Phase II (1986) ===
In 1986 the Phase II BX was launched. The interior and dashboard were redesigned to be more conventional-looking than the original, which used Citroën's idiosyncratic "satellite" switchgear, and "bathroom scale" speedometer. These were replaced with more conventional stalks for light and wipers and analogue instruments. The earlier GT (and Sport) models already had a "normal" speedometer and tachometer. The exterior was also slightly updated, with new more rounded bumpers, flared wheelarches to accept wider tyres, new and improved mirrors and the front indicators replaced with larger clear ones which fitted flush with the headlights. The elderly Douvrin engine was replaced by the newer TU-series engine on the 1.4 litre models, although it continued to be installed in the tiny BX11 until 1992.

1988 saw the launch of the BX Turbo Diesel, which was praised by the motoring press. The BX diesel was already a strong seller, but the Turbo model brought new levels of refinement and performance to the diesel market, which brought an end to the common notion that diesel cars were slow and noisy. Diesel Car magazine said of the BX "We can think of no other car currently on sale in the UK that comes anywhere near approaching the BX Turbo's combination of performance, accommodation and economy".

=== Phase II facelift (1989) ===
In 1989, the BX range had further minor revisions and specification improvements made to it, including smoked rear lamp units, new wheel trims and interior fabrics.

Winning many Towcar of the Year awards, the BX was renowned as a tow car (as was its larger sister, the CX), especially the diesel models, due to their power and economy combined with the self levelling suspension.

The biggest problem of the BX was its variable build quality, compared to its competition. In 1983, one quarter of the production needed "touchups" before they could be shipped. Later models were better built, but the reputation had been tarnished. It had been partially replaced by the smaller ZX in early 1991, but its key replacement was the slightly larger Xantia that went on sale at the beginning of 1993, when the BX hatchback was discontinued, although the estate models lasted into the following year, when the estate version of the Xantia was launched.

== Performance models ==
=== Sport ===
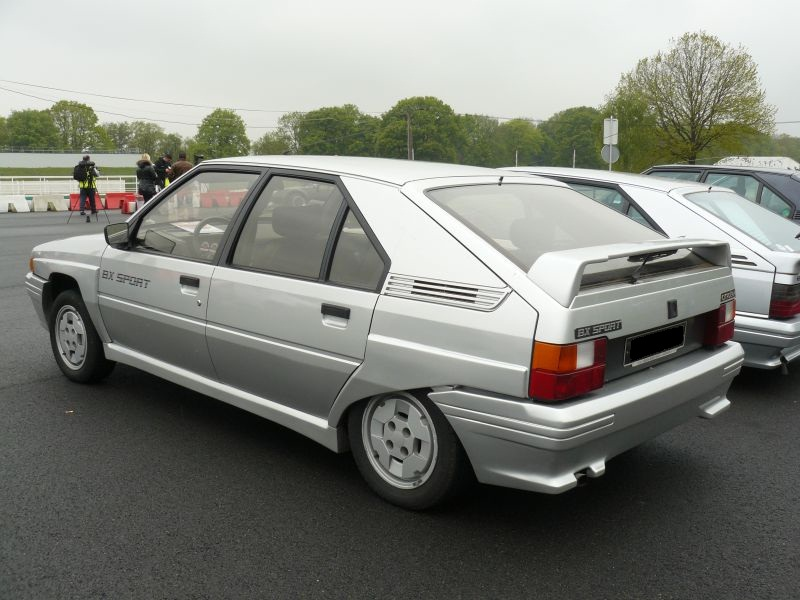
The BX Sport received lots of additional plastic cladding

As well as the normal BX, Citroën produced the BX Sport from 1985 to 1987. During this period, Citroën produced 7,500 BX Sports; 2,500 in the first series, then an extra 5,000 due to its sales success. Rated at 126 PS (93 kW) at 5800 rpm and equipped with dual twin-barrel carburettors, the BX Sport was the most powerful BX in production at that time. The engine modifications, including a reshaped combustion chamber and larger valves, were developed by famous French tuner Danielson. It also stood out with its unique body kit, alloy wheels later also used on the GTi, a unique dashboard and Pullman interior. The seat fabric was the same as that used on the CX Turbo at the time. The body kit included a rear wing, side skirts, and fender extensions that added 10 cm to each side of the car in order to accommodate the larger wheels. The car was only available in LHD and was not sold in the United Kingdom. Period road tests complimented the ride quality (as usual with Citroëns) but complained that the driving characteristics were not all that sporty as a result, even though the suspension had also been modified.

=== GT ===
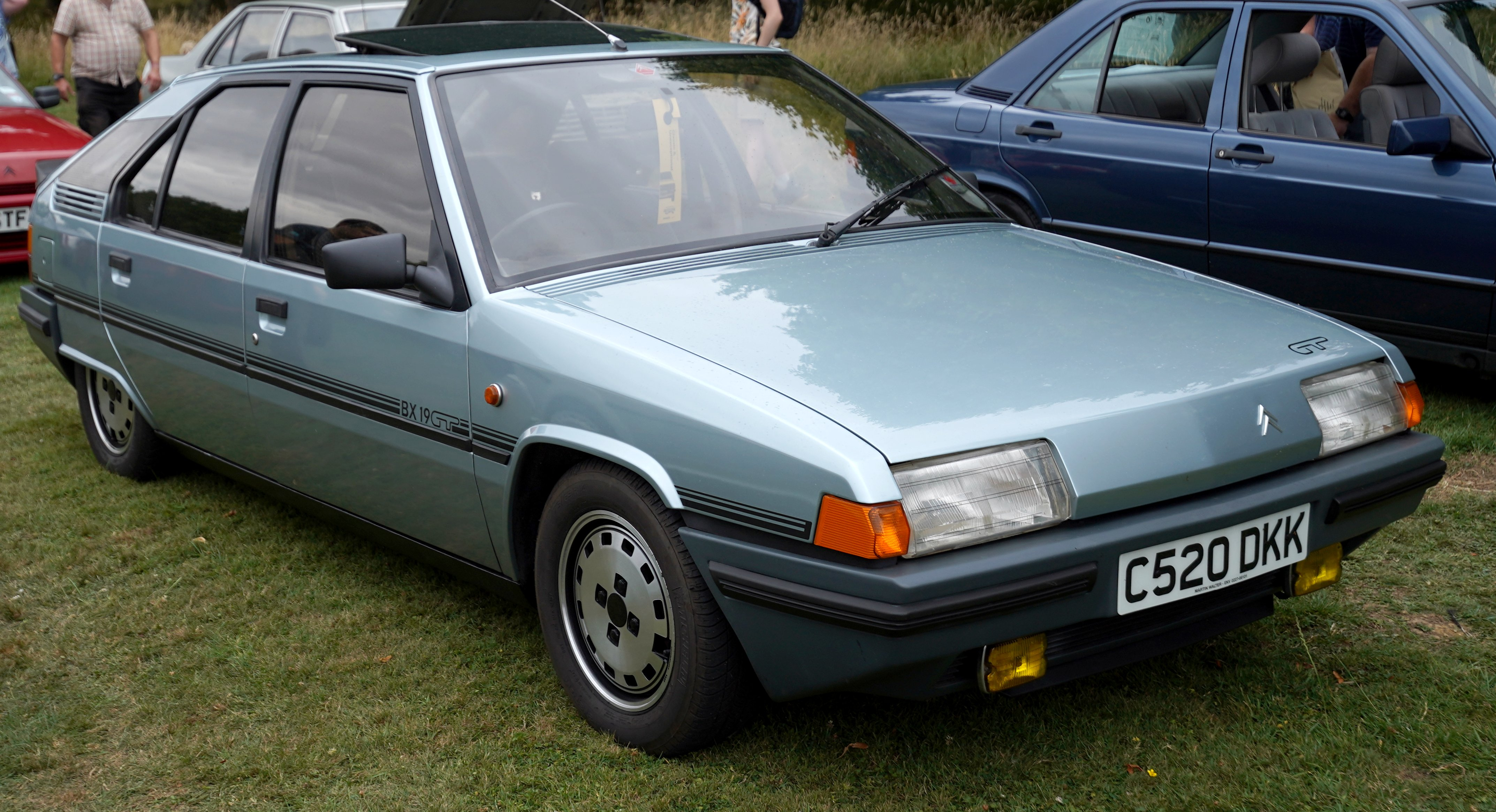
1985 BX GT

The BX GT was launched in 1985 and featured a 1.9 L Peugeot-sourced engine, in general a Sport engine with only one twin choke carburettor. Max power is 105 PS (77 kW). That same year, Citroën produced a "Digit" model, which was based on the BX GT. It featured a digital instrument cluster and an onboard computer. Citroën only produced 4,000 BX Digits in 1985.

=== 4TC ===
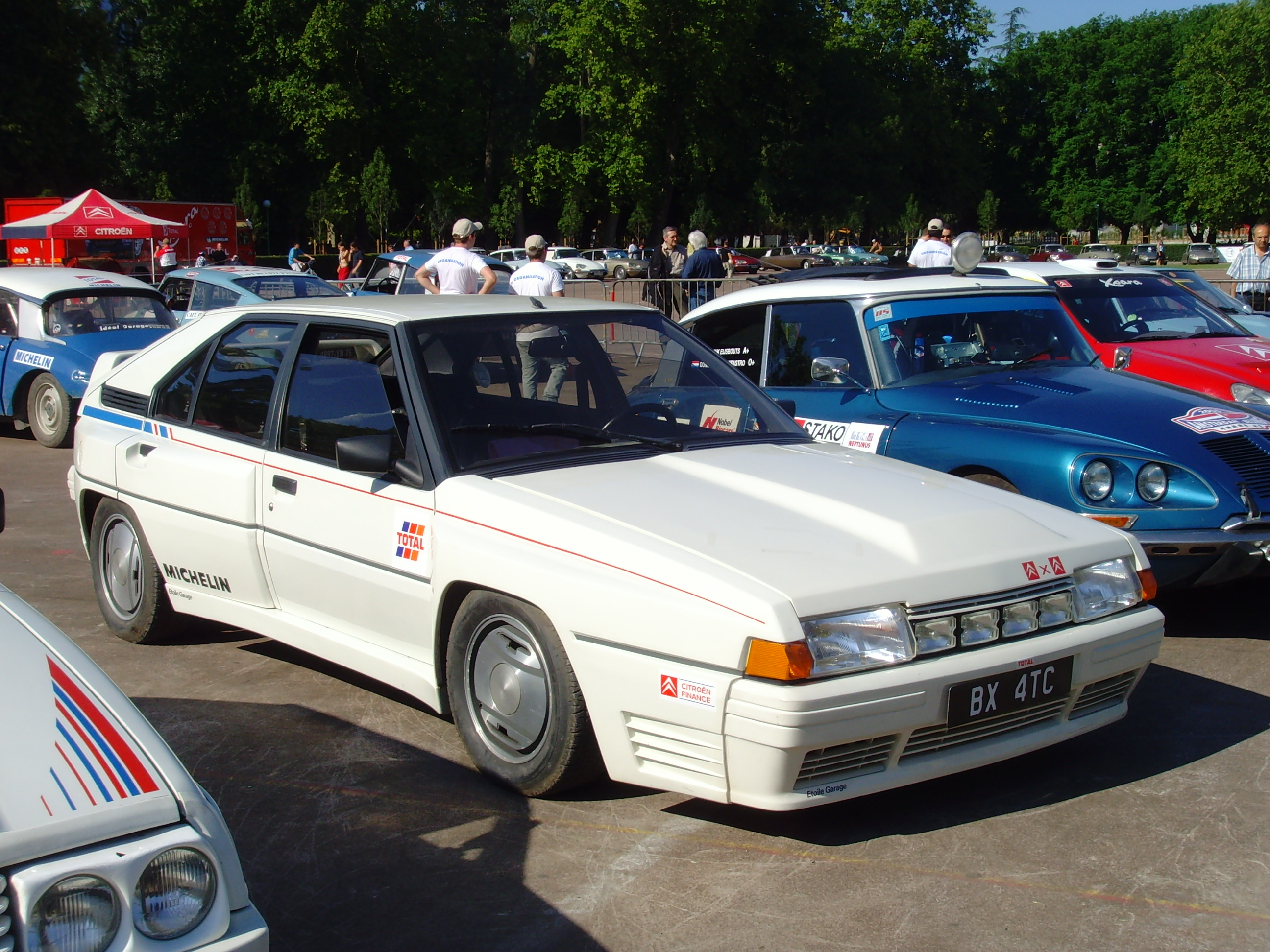
Citroën BX 4TC

Citroën entered Group B rallying with the BX in 1986. The specially designed rally BX was called the BX 4TC and bore little resemblance to the standard BX. It had a very long nose because the engine (a turbocharger fitted version of Chrysler Europe's Simca Type 180 engine) was mounted longitudinally, unlike in the regular BX. The engine was downsized to 2,141.5 cc (from 2,155 cc) to stay under the three-litre limit after FIA's multiplication factor of 1.4 was applied. The rally version of the BX also featured the unique hydropneumatic suspension, and the five-speed manual gearbox from the Citroën SM. The rear axle was from the rear-wheel drive Peugeot 505, with a carbon fibre prop shaft. Because of the Group B regulations, 200 street versions of the 4TC also had to be built, with a 200 PS (147 kW) at 5,250 rpm version of the N9TE engine.

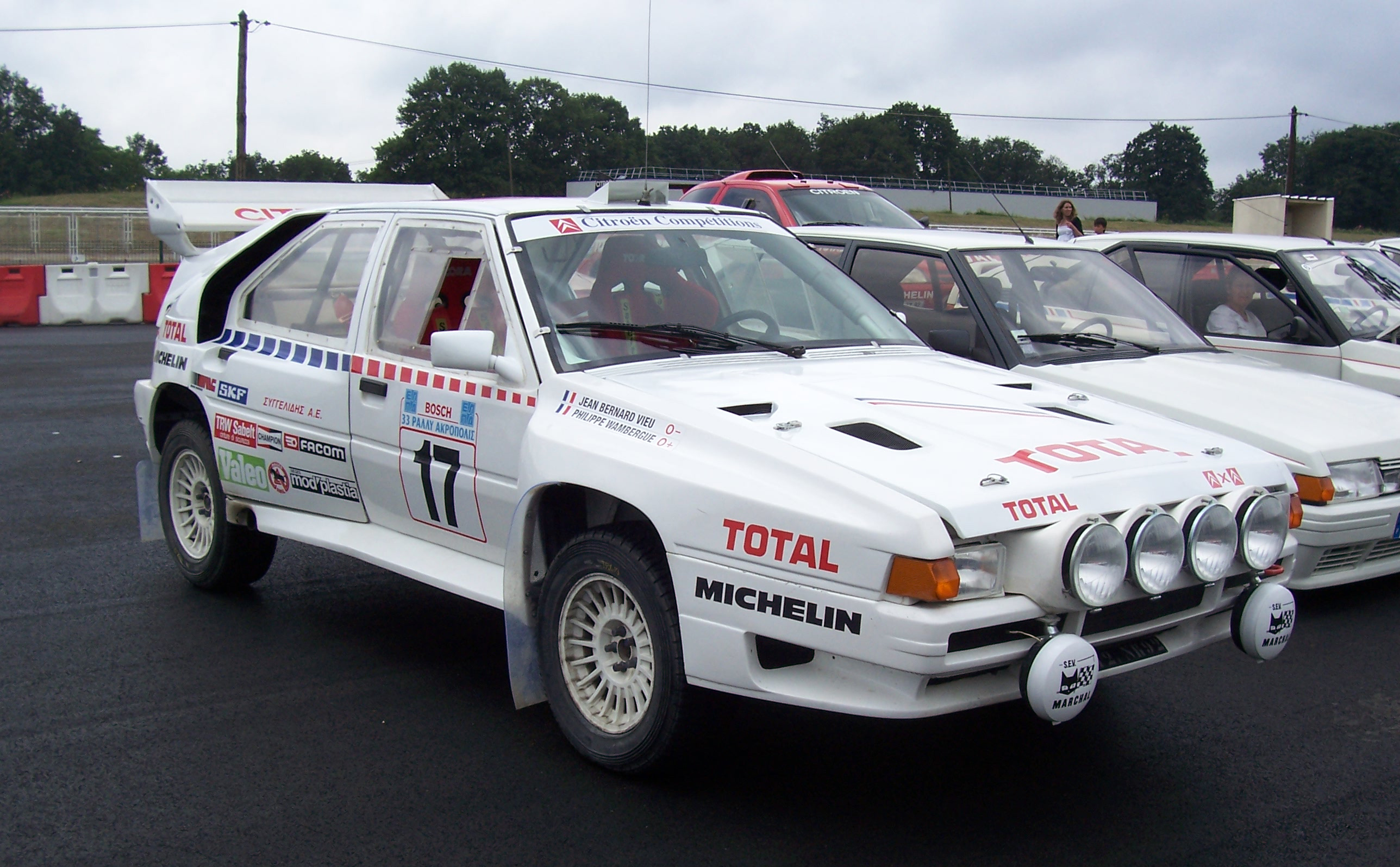
Citroën BX 4TC Evolution

The 4TC was not successful in World Rally Championship competition, its best result being a sixth place in the 1986 Swedish Rally. The 4TC only participated in three rallies before the Group B class was banned in late 1986, following the death of Henri Toivonen in his Lancia Delta S4 at the Tour de Corse Rally. Aside from being overweight and with bad weight distribution, the BX 4TC also suffered from restricted suspension travel compared to the competition and did not feature a central differential, meaning that the front and rear axle were usually struggling against each other - limiting the cars effectiveness on tarmac in particular.

Already discouraged by the car's poor performance in motorsport and the demise of Group B, Citroën was only able to sell 62 roadgoing 4TCs; build quality and reliability problems led Citroën to buy back many of these 4TCs for salvage and destruction. With only a fraction of the original 200 examples remaining, the 4TC is now highly sought after. While a few privateers continued to campaign the BX 4TC Evolution in the French rallycross championships, Citroën pressured them to stop and by 1989 the competition history of the BX 4TC came to a final end.

=== GTi ===
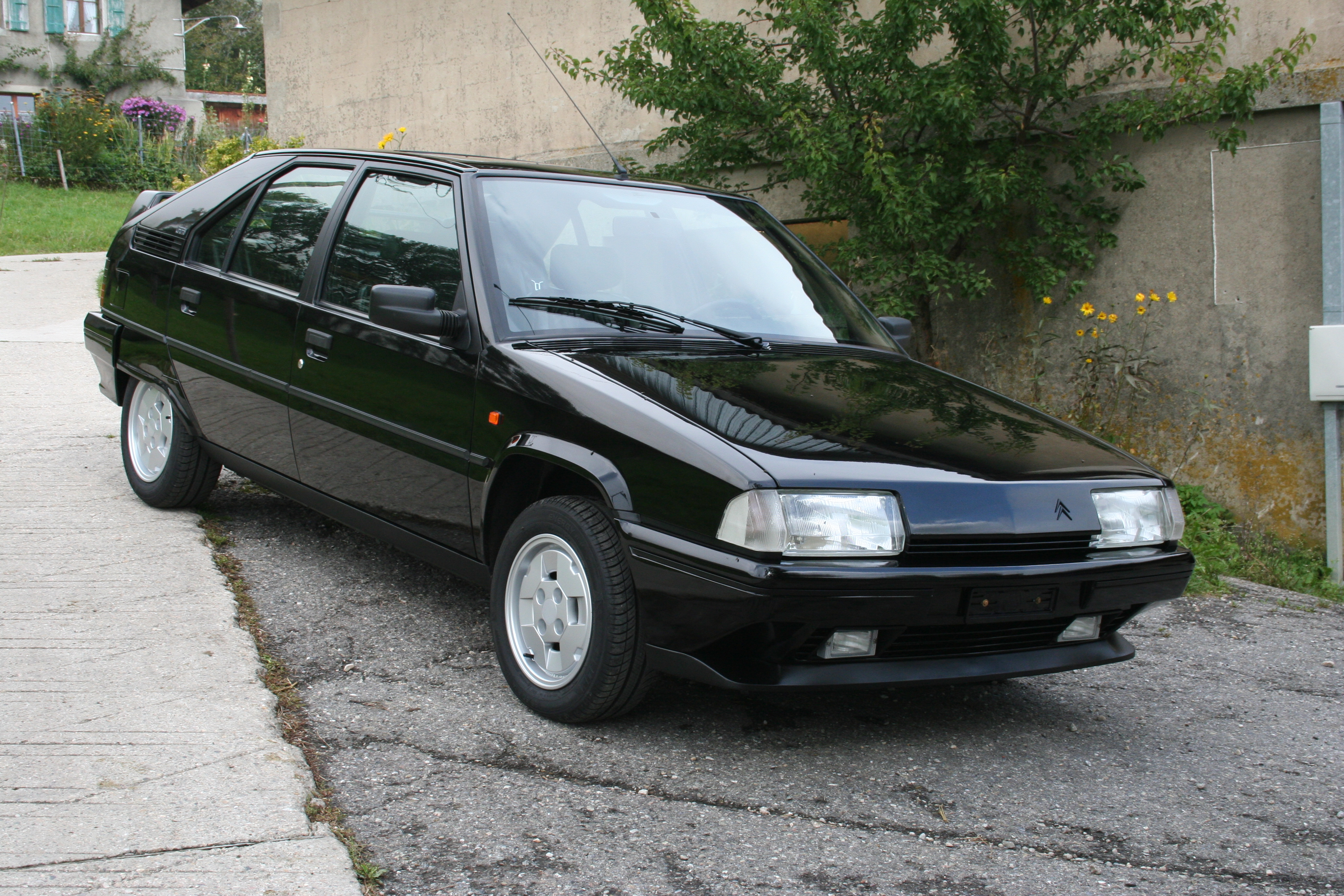
Citroën BX GTi (8v)

An uprated version of the BX GT, the BX19 GTi was fitted with a 1.9 L eight-valve fuel injected engine producing 122 PS (90 kW) (this engine also fitted to the Peugeot 405 SRi, and being very similar to the engine also fitted to the 205 GTi, however the BX19 GTi and Peugeot 405 SRi used a different inlet manifold and cylinder head to the Peugeot 205 GTi), a spoiler and firmer suspension spheres/anti-roll bar than the standard model; it could reach 198 km/h. There was also a special export model, the BX16 GTi, using the 113 PS (83 kW) XU5JA engine from the Peugeot 205 GTi 1.6. Top speed is 194 km/h (121 mph).

=== 16V ===
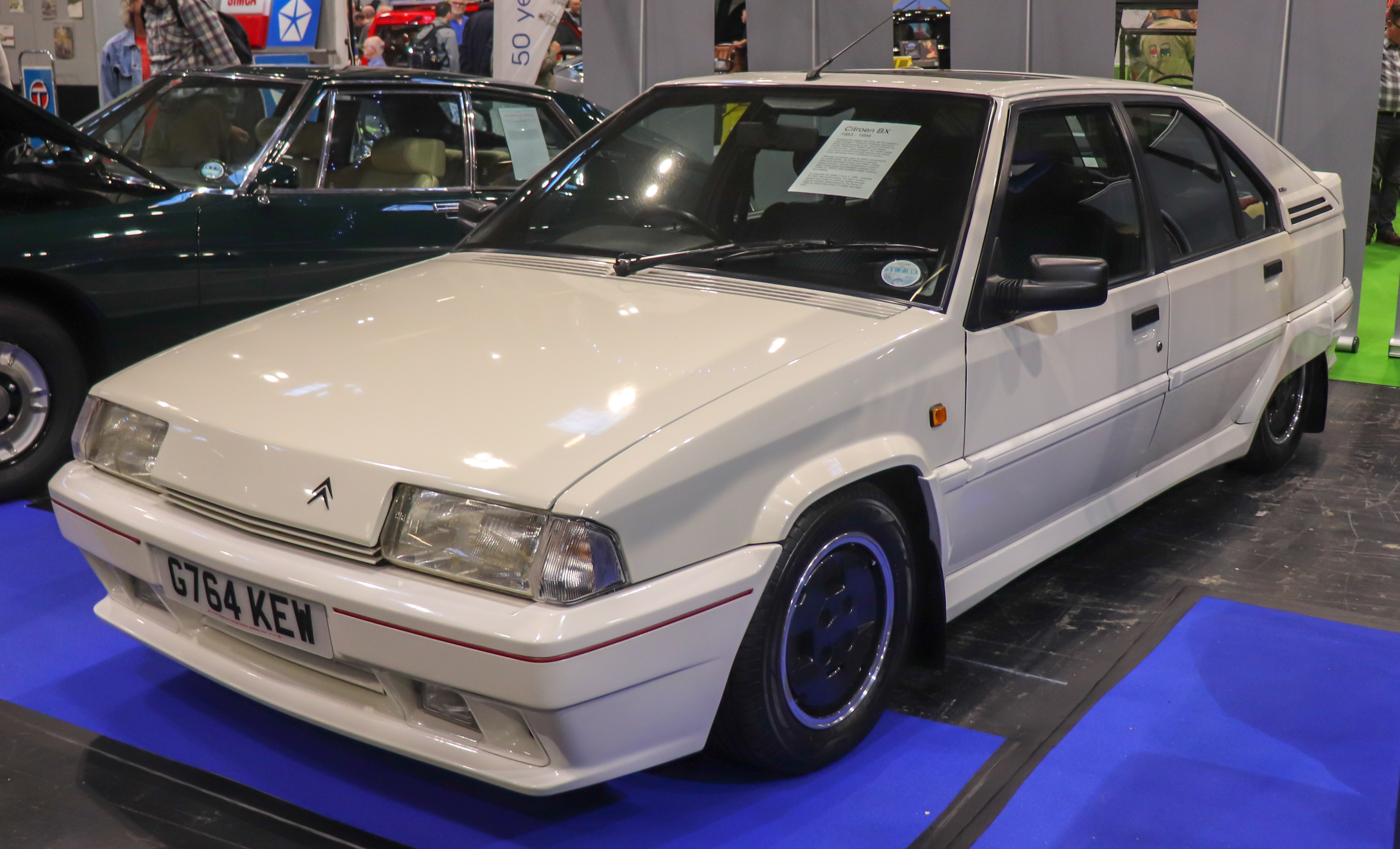
1989 Citroën BX GTi 16V 1.9

In May 1987, a 16-valve version of the GTi was launched. This was the first mass-produced French car to be fitted with a 16-valve engine. A DOHC twin-exhaust port cylinder head, based on that of the Peugeot 205 Turbo 16 Group B rally car was bolted to an uprated version of the 1905 cc XU9 8v alloy engine block as fitted to the BX GTi and Peugeot 205 GTi. The result was the XU9J4; a naturally aspirated 1.9 L engine, (also fitted to the phase 1 Peugeot 405 Mi16) producing 158 bhp (118 kW) and 177 N⋅m (131 lb⋅ft) of torque. More specifically, it produced a specific output of 84 bhp/litre, which for a fixed cam-timing, naturally aspirated engine was fairly impressive at the time. This helped "rocket" the BX to 100 km/h (62 mph) in 7.6 seconds (0-60 mph (97 km/h) in 7.4 seconds) and then 160 km/h (99 mph) in 19.9 seconds before then finally stopping at a top speed of 136 mph (219 km/h). Anti-lock brakes were fitted as standard. Its side skirts made it easily recognizable from all other BX models. In 1990, the facelift of the 16V gave the car a new lease of life. The updated car came with new fibreglass bumpers, anthracite painted wheels, smoked taillight lenses, and a redesigned rear spoiler. These cosmetic changes made the car look even more distinctive from other BXs. There were also a few subtle changes made to the car's performance, the most noticeable being harder suspension and a thicker anti-roll bar, which improved handling.

The BX 16V was found to be faster around a race-track than the "in house" competitor Peugeot 405 Mi16 in a test in the Swedish motoring magazine Teknikens Värld. Also in Sweden, young driver Magnus Gustafsson competed successfully in rally with a group A tuned BX 16V. The engine produced 215 PS (158 kW) and Gustafsson was second in the Swedish International Rally 1993 in the A7 category.

== Engines ==
Citroën BX Petrol (gasoline) engines
Model	Engine family/type	Engine capacity cc	Max. Power	Max. Torque	Fuel feed	Catalytic converter	0–100 km/h (0-62 mph)	Top speed	Years
BX 11	PSA-Renault XW3	1124	43 kW (58 PS; 58 hp) at 6250 rpm	79 N⋅m (58 lb⋅ft) at 2750 rpm	1 chamber carb	No	17.3 s	150 km/h (93 mph)	1986–1988
BX 11	PSA TU1/K	1124	40 kW (55 PS; 54 hp) at 5800 rpm	89 N⋅m (66 lb⋅ft) at 3200 rpm	1 chamber carb	No	16.3 s	154 km/h (96 mph)	1988–1991
BX 14	PSA-Renault XY7	1360	46 kW (63 PS; 62 hp) at 5500 rpm	108 N⋅m (80 lb⋅ft) at 2500 rpm	2 chamber carb	No	14.1 s	162 km/h (101 mph)	1982–1986
BX 14	PSA-Renault XY7	1360	40 kW (55 PS; 54 hp) at 5000 rpm	103 N⋅m (76 lb⋅ft) at 2500 rpm	1 chamber carb	Yes	18.5 s	154 km/h (96 mph)	1986–1989
BX 14	PSA-Renault XY6B	1360	53 kW (72 PS; 71 hp) at 5750 rpm	108 N⋅m (80 lb⋅ft) at 3000 rpm	2 chamber carb	No	13.5 s	163 km/h (101 mph)	1982–1989
BX 14	PSA TU3 A/K	1360	53 kW (72 PS; 71 hp) at 5600 rpm	111 N⋅m (82 lb⋅ft) at 3400 rpm	1 chamber carburation	No	14.9 s	167 km/h (104 mph)	1989–1992
BX 14	PSA TU3	1360	55 kW (75 PS; 74 hp) at 6200 rpm	109 N⋅m (80 lb⋅ft) at 4000 rpm	Fuel injection	Yes	13.3 s	170 km/h (106 mph)	1989–1994
BX 15	PSA XU5 1C	1580	59 kW (80 PS; 79 hp) at 5600 rpm	132 N⋅m (97 lb⋅ft) at 2800 rpm	1 chamber carb	No	12.6 s	170 km/h (106 mph)	1986–1992
BX 15	PSA XU5 1C(?)	1580	53 kW (72 PS; 71 hp) at 5600 rpm	111 N⋅m (82 lb⋅ft) at 3400 rpm	1 chamber carb	Yes	14.1 s	165 km/h (103 mph)	1988–1990
BX 16	PSA XU5 2C	1580	66 kW (90 PS; 89 hp) at 6000 rpm	128 N⋅m (94 lb⋅ft) at 3500 rpm	2 chamber carb	No	11.5 s	176 km/h (109 mph)	1982–1983
BX 16	PSA XU5 2C	1580	68 kW (92 PS; 91 hp) at 6000 rpm	131 N⋅m (97 lb⋅ft) at 3500 rpm	2 chamber carb	No	11.3 s	176 km/h (109 mph)	1983–1984
BX 16	PSA XU5 2C	1580	69 kW (94 PS; 93 hp) at 6000 rpm	137 N⋅m (101 lb⋅ft) at 3250 rpm	2 chamber carb	No	11.3 s	176 km/h (109 mph)	1984–1992
BX 16	PSA XU5	1580	55 kW (75 PS; 74 hp) at 5600 rpm	120 N⋅m (89 lb⋅ft) at 3500 rpm	Carburettor	Yes	14.9 s	167 km/h 104 mph)	1986–1988
BX 16 TGI	PSA XU5 M3/Z	1580	65 kW (88 PS; 87 hp) at 6000 rpm	128 N⋅m (94 lb⋅ft) at 3000 rpm	Fuel injection	Yes	12.6 s	174 km/h (108 mph)	1989–1994
BX 16	PSA XU5 J (180A)	1580	77 kW (105 PS; 104 hp) at 6250 rpm	134 N⋅m (99 lb⋅ft) at 4000 rpm	Bosch Jetronic Fuel injection	No	11.0 s	185 km/h (115 mph)	1986–1990
BX 16	PSA XU5 JA (B6D)	1580	83 kW (111 hp; 113 PS) at 6250 rpm	131 N⋅m (97 lb⋅ft) at 3000 rpm	Bosch Jetronic Fuel injection	No	10.2 s	194 km/h (121 mph)	1988–1992
BX 19	PSA XU9 S	1905	77 kW (105 PS; 104 hp) at 5600 rpm	162 N⋅m (119 lb⋅ft) at 3000 rpm	2 chamber carb	No	10.0 s	185 km/h (115 mph)	1984–1989
BX 19	PSA XU9 J1/Z	1905	77 kW (105 PS; 104 hp) at 6000 rpm	141 N⋅m (104 lb⋅ft) at 3000 rpm	Fuel injection	Yes	14.1 s	180 km/h (112 mph)	1986–1989
BX 19	PSA XU9 2C	1905	79 kW (107 PS; 106 hp) at 6000 rpm	163 N⋅m (120 lb⋅ft) at 3500 rpm	2 chamber carb	No	10.7 s	187 km/h (116 mph)	1989–1992
BX 19	PSA XU9M	1905	80 kW (109 PS; 108 hp) at 6000 rpm	162 N⋅m (119 lb⋅ft) at 3000 rpm	Fuel injection	Yes	10.9 s	189 km/h (117 mph)	1989–1993
BX 19	PSA XU9 J2 (D6D)	1905	90 kW (122 PS; 120 hp) at 5500 rpm	169 N⋅m (125 lb⋅ft) at 2750 rpm	Fuel injection	No	9.1 s	192 km/h (119 mph)	1990–1994
BX 19	PSA XU9 J2 (D6A)	1905	88 kW (120 PS; 118 hp) at 6000 rpm	150 N⋅m (111 lb⋅ft) at 3000 rpm	Fuel injection	Yes	10.9 s	189 km/h (117 mph)	1990–1994
BX Sport	PSA XU9 4C	1905	93 kW (126 PS; 125 hp) at 5800 rpm	169 N⋅m (125 lb⋅ft) at 4200 rpm	2 x 2 chamber carbs	No	8.9 s	195 km/h (121 mph)	1985–1986
BX 19 GTi	PSA XU9 J2	1905	92 kW (125 PS; 123 hp) at 5500 rpm	175 N⋅m (129 lb⋅ft) at 4500 rpm	Bosch Jetronic Fuel injection	No	8.5 s	198 km/h (123 mph)	1986–1990
BX 19 GTi/TZi	PSA XU9 JAZ	1905	90 kW (123 PS; 121 hp) at 5500 rpm	169 N⋅m (125 lb⋅ft) at 2750 rpm	Bosch Motronic Fuel injection	No	8.9 s	198 km/h (123 mph)	1990–1994
BX 19	PSA XU9 JAZ	1905	88 kW (120 PS; 118 hp) at 6000 rpm	150 N⋅m (111 lb⋅ft) at 3000 rpm	Bosch Motronic Fuel injection	Yes	10.9 s	196 km/h (122 mph)	1990–1993
BX 19	PSA XU9 J4 / D6C (MI16)	1905	118 kW (160 PS; 158 hp) at 6500 rpm	181 N⋅m (133 lb⋅ft) at 5000 rpm	Bosch Motronic Fuel injection	No	8.6 s	220 km/h (137 mph)	1987–1992
BX 19	PSA XU9 J4/Z / DFW (MI16)	1905	108 kW (147 PS; 145 hp) at 6400 rpm	166 N⋅m (122 lb⋅ft) at 5000 rpm	Bosch Motronic Fuel injection	Yes	9.6 s	215 km/h (134 mph)	1988–1993
BX 4TC	(Group B rally special)	2141 turbocharged	147 kW (200 PS; 197 hp) at 5250 rpm	294 N⋅m (217 lb⋅ft) at 2750 rpm	Bosch K-Jetronic Fuel injection	No	7.5 s	220 km/h (137 mph)	1985
Citroën BX Diesel engines
Model	Engine family/type	Engine capacity cc	Max. Power	Max. Torque	Fuel feed	Catalytic converter	0–100 km/h (0-62 mph)	Top speed	Year
BX 17 D	PSA XUD7/K	1769	44 kW (60 PS; 59 hp) at 4600 rpm	110 N⋅m (81 lb⋅ft) at 2000 rpm	Swirl chamber	No	17.2 s	155 km/h (96 mph)	1985–1992
BX 17 D Turbo	PSA XUD7 TE	1769	66 kW (90 PS; 89 hp) at 4300 rpm	180 N⋅m (133 lb⋅ft) at 2000 rpm	Swirl chamber	No	10.8 s	180 km/h (112 mph)	1988–1992
BX 17 D Turbo	PSA XUD7 TE	1769	66 kW (90 PS; 89 hp) at 4300 rpm	180 N⋅m (133 lb⋅ft) at 2100 rpm	Swirl chamber	Yes	11.0 s	180 km/h (112 mph)	1992–1994
BX 19 D	PSA XUD9	1905	48 kW (65 PS; 64 hp) at 4600 rpm	120 N⋅m (89 lb⋅ft) at 2000 rpm	Swirl chamber	No	15.5 s	157 km/h (98 mph)	1983–1987
BX 19 D	PSA XUD9 A	1905	52 kW (71 PS; 70 hp) at 4600 rpm	123 N⋅m (91 lb⋅ft) at 2000 rpm	Swirl chamber	No	16.3 s	165 km/h (103 mph)	1987–1992

== BX Van ==
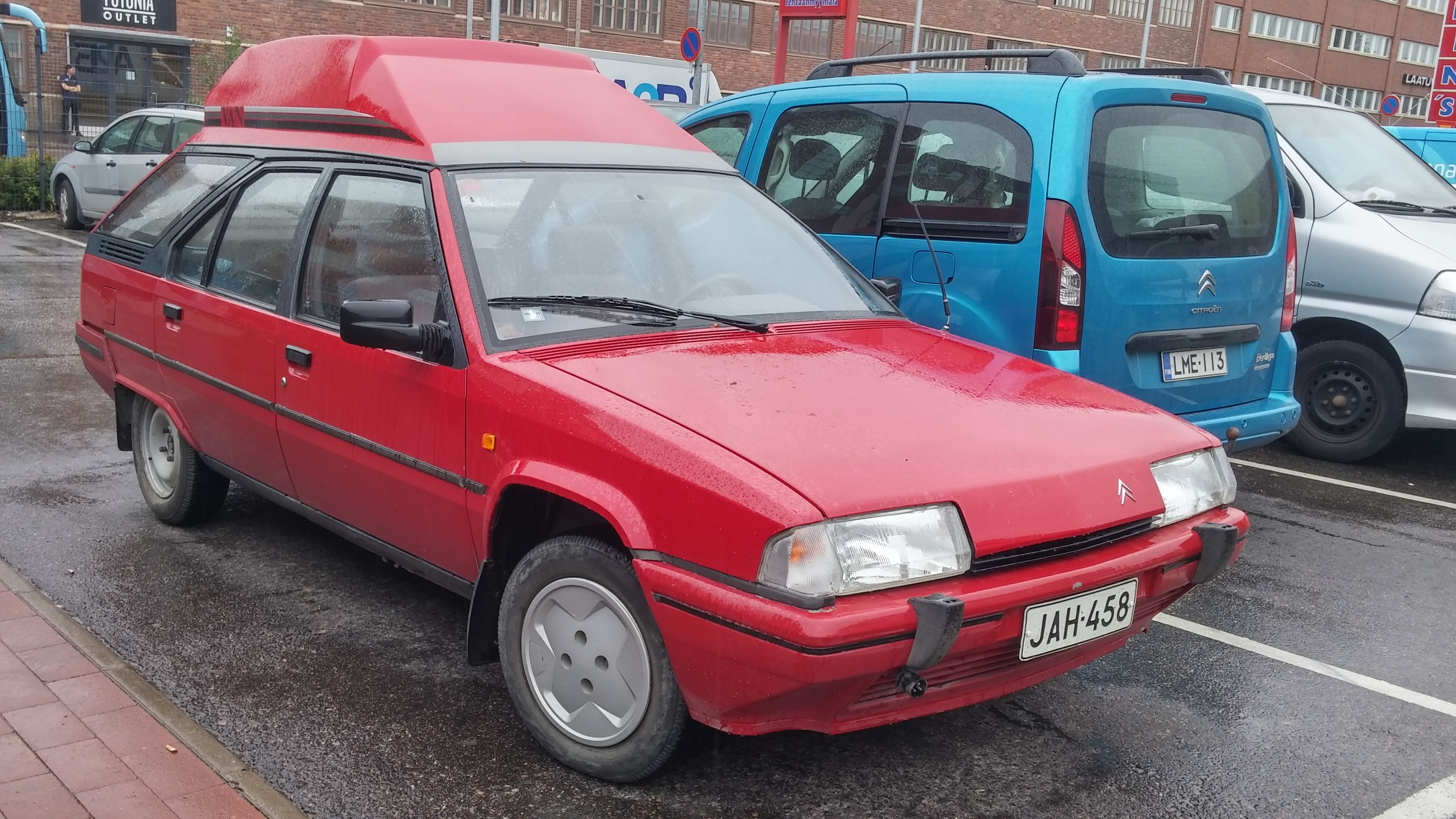
1991 Citroën BX Van in Finland

A version of the BX with an extended fiberglass roof and no rear seat called the BX Van was produced in Finland. At the time vans had to pay a smaller registration tax than passenger cars so people wanted to be able to register the BX as a van. The regular BX estate couldn't be registered as a van in Finland because Finnish law required vans to have a cargo space at least 130 centimeters high and 2.5m^{3} in cargo volume, lengthwise measured awkwardly from inner boot lid to the bottom of steering wheel. The higher roof was achieved by cutting off the original steel roof and replacing it with a large box made of fiberglass. The BX Van was quite popular and over 2000 of them were sold.

A different van version was marketed in Ireland. This was directly based upon the shape of the estate but with rear doors and windows removed.

== See also ==
- Anadol FW 11 (1977)
