= Reliant FW11 =

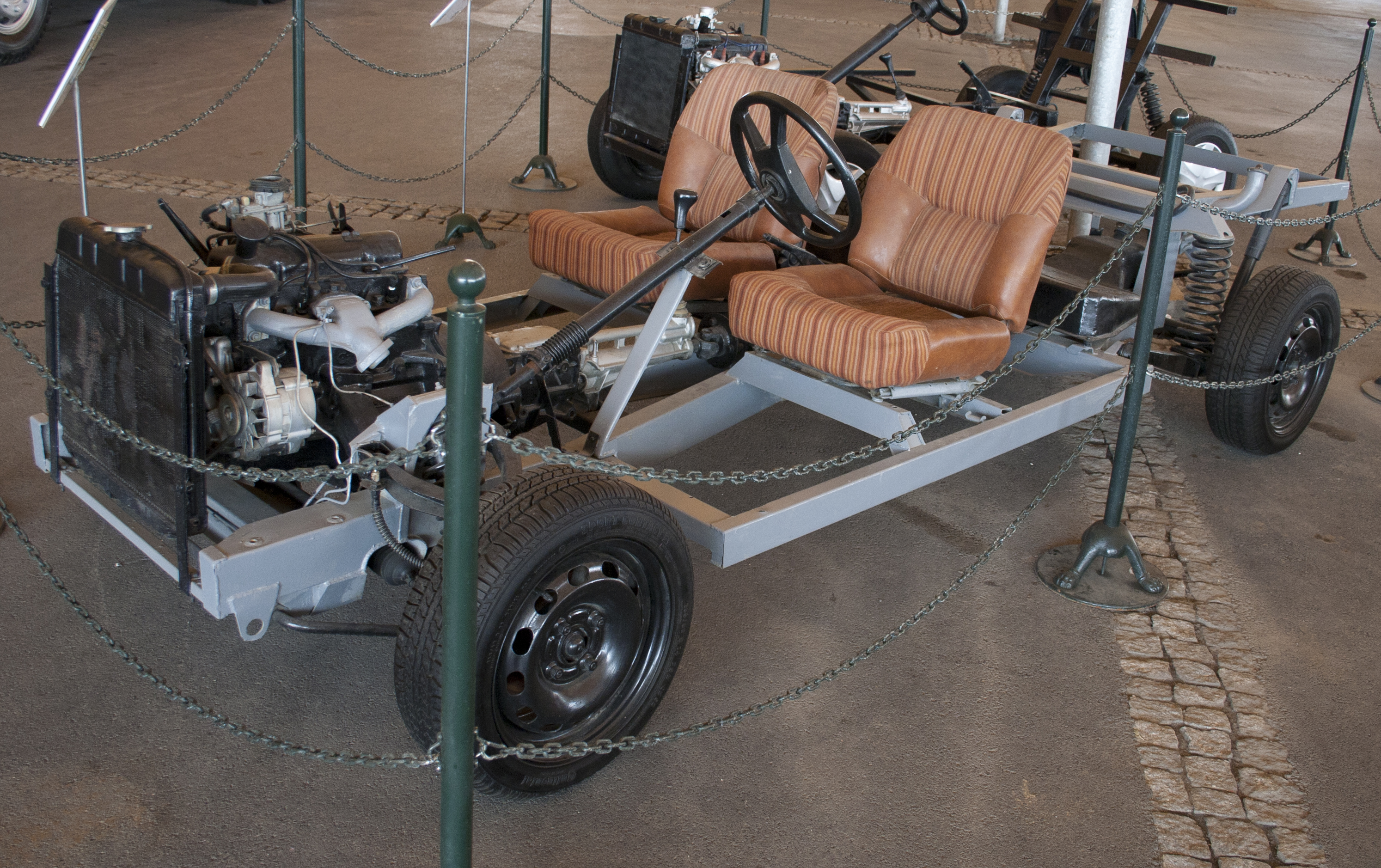
- FW11 chassis on display in the Rahmi M. Koç Museum of Transportation

Overview
- Manufacturer: Reliant
- Production: 1977
- Designer: Marcello Gandini

The Reliant FW11 is a prototype car designed by Marcello Gandini of Gruppo Bertone in 1977 for the British company Reliant who were developing the car for the Turkish Otosan car company.

The five-door hatchback sits on a wheel base of 2629 mm and an overall length of 4350 mm. It was designed to suit a range of engines from 1.3- to 2.0-litre.

Four prototypes of this car were produced, two of which were sent to England with the Reliant badge, and two other examples, one of them white and the other one blue, were sent to Turkey with Otosan's Anadol badge. The car, which had a modern design and "luxuries" for that period's European cars such as electrical windows, was deemed too expensive to produce profitably by Anadol and the project was shelved. Following Anadol's decision not to build the FW 11, Reliant exhibited the Scimitar SE 7 at its stand as a prototype during the 1980 Birmingham Motor Show.

The two Anadol prototypes were held in Koç Holding's (which owns Otosan) depot in Istanbul's Acıbadem district for nearly 25 years. Today, one of them is displayed at the Rahmi M. Koç Museum in Istanbul, since 2004. One of the other prototypes, the Reliant Scimitar SE 7, was purchased by a German collector in 2006 and exported from England.

The FW 11 design was later refined by Bertone for use by Citroën, and with little changes (e.g. a steel unibody with steel and plastic panels instead of fibreglass) it was mass-produced as the Citroën BX for 12 years, becoming a "best-seller" for the French company.
