= Jaguar Ascot =

Concept car designed by Bertone for Jaguar

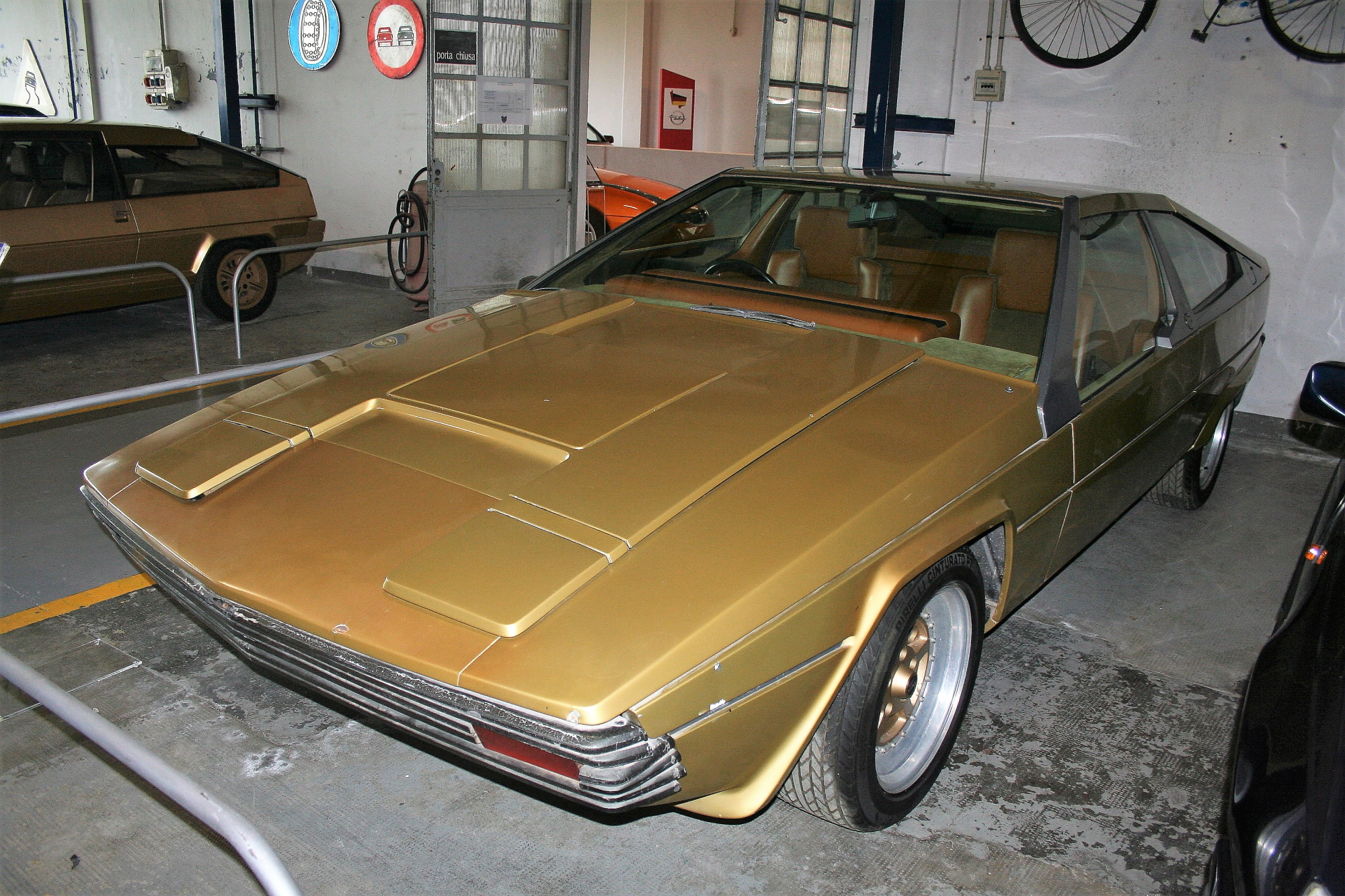

Overview
- Manufacturer: Jaguar
- Production: 1977
- Designer: Marcello Gandini at Bertone

Body and chassis
- Class: Concept car
- Body style: 3-door hatchback

The Jaguar Ascot is a concept car designed by Marcello Gandini and built by Italian firm Bertone for Jaguar. First presented in 1977, it is based on the Jaguar XJS. Visually, the Ascot closely resembles Bertone's Ferrari 308 GT Rainbow, presented a year earlier.

== History ==
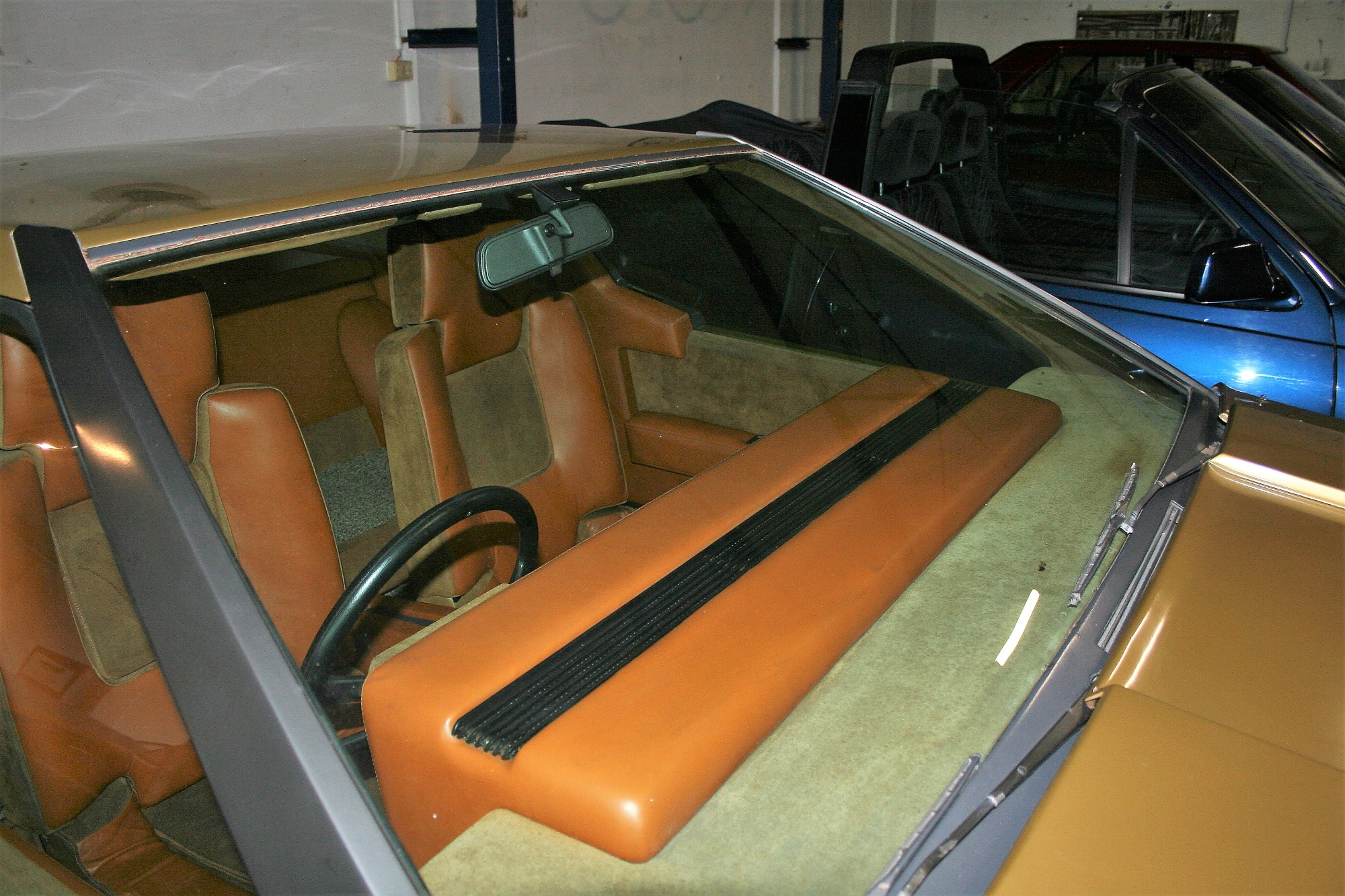
Windshield and dashboard of the Jaguar Ascot.

In the first half of the 1970s, Jaguar sought to replace the aging E-Type. The XJS was thus born in 1975, and it was radically different, with a more GT-like style. However, the XJS was a slow seller, being released in the middle of an oil crisis, and being criticized by some for its styling, with many seeing it as not living up to the E-Type. The XJS was released the year in which Jaguar became the property of the British government, just like the rest of the brands then belonging to British Leyland. Some have asserted that, during that time, saving jobs and the financial stability of the group became the number one objective. A context governed by sobriety in which it was not possible to risk everything in terms of design and innovation. Many coachbuilders then attempted to imagine their own version of a successor to the E-Type. Pininfarina presented their XJ Spider concept, while Bertone presented a redesigned version of the XJ-S in 1978, called the Ascot.

The Ascot followed the Ferrari Rainbow (1976) and the Lamborghini Bravo (1974) with its angular lines and wedge-shaped profile. It allowed Bertone and Marcello Gandini to continue developing the Italian coachbuilder's angular style at the dawn of the 1980s. The Ascot bucked the styling trends of current and previous Jaguar models, with lines that are brutal and sharp, reminiscent of certain Lotus and TVR cars of the 1970s. The concept never reached production.

The Ascot was ultimately handed over to Bertone by Jaguar after touring numerous motor shows.

== Specifications ==
The Ascot featured the 5.3L V12 and automatic transmission from the XJ-S. The body of the Ascot is made with aluminum panels and features a hatchback design like the outgoing E-Type fastback coupe, as well as pop-up headlights. The interior, featuring a massive dashboard, is finished in a mix of brown leather and suede, paired with the XJS's instrument cluster and a car phone.

Later, stylistic details, such as the rear wings and the shape of the windows, would still be found on future models designed by Marcello Gandini, such as the Volvo Tundra (1979), the Lamborghini Jalpa and the Citroën BX, particularly on the rear.
