= NSU Trapeze =

1973 Bertone concept car

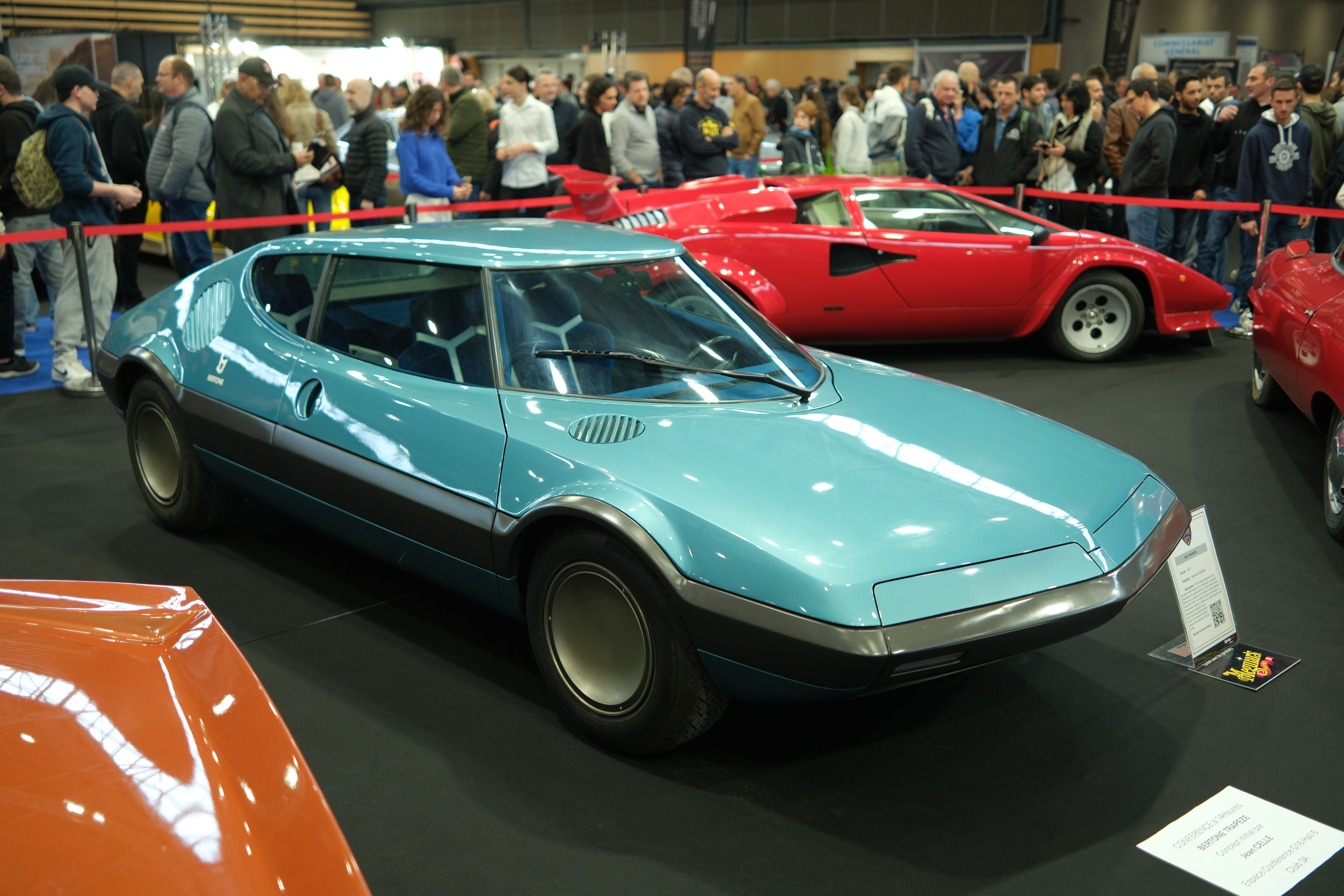
- NSU Trapeze at 2024 Salon Epoqu'auto

Overview
- Manufacturer: Bertone
- Production: 1973
- Designer: Marcello Gandini (Bertone)

Body and chassis
- Class: 2+2 sportscar
- Body style: 3-door coupé
- Layout: Rear mid-engine, rear-wheel-drive
- Related: NSU Ro 80

Powertrain
- Engine: 497.5 x 2-rotor Wankel, 115 PS (85 kW; 113 hp)
- Transmission: 3-speed manual with torque converter

Dimensions
- Wheelbase: 2,430 mm (95.7 in)
- Length: 4,080 mm (160.6 in)
- Width: 1,830 mm (72.0 in)
- Height: 1,100 mm (43.3 in)

The NSU Trapeze is a 1973 concept car designed by Marcello Gandini during his tenure at Bertone, inspired by patents held by Jean Celle.

== History ==
At the 1971 Turin Auto Show, Bertone showed its prototype for the production Lancia Stratos HF. Two years later, at the Paris Motorshow in October 1973, Gandini showed a concept car called the Trapeze designed for NSU but inspired by the Stratos, whose influence was visible in many of the styling features of that model: very compact volumes, an enormous wrap-around windshield and side windows that did not continue to the rear. The wedge-shaped Trapeze also has similarities with the Autobianchi A112 Runabout, another of Gandini's designs for Bertone.

== Strategy ==
The Trapeze was a sports car with a mid-engined configuration chosen to give the car an optimal weight balance. Bertone set out to build this concept car with a clear strategy in mind. First, Bertone wanted to further improve its relationship with Audi in its competition with Ital Design, who had just produced the Asso di Picche coupé for the German marque. Bertone made a tactical move by working with Audi's sister-brand NSU. Also, Bertone wanted to show its innovative power by creating a small and elegant sporty car that would still meet the American DOT safety standards that were introduced around that time.

== Trapezium shaped concept ==
The engine was the bi-rotor Wankel from the NSU Ro 80, a 1.0-liter with an output of 115 PS (85 kW; 113 hp) and 158 N⋅m (117 lb⋅ft) torque. Thanks to the compact dimensions of the engine and the fact that it was positioned lengthwise rather than transversely, Gandini had space available to squeeze in two small back seats, making the Trapeze the first mid-engined sports car with room for four. The rear seats, however, were not positioned in the traditional way but towards the outside, left and right of the engine, while the front seats were set as close to the centre as possible in front of the engine. When looking at the seating arrangement from above, one could see a trapezium shape — the reason why the car is called Trapeze.

This setup was patented by Jean Celle in spring 1967, in which the seats formed part of the chassis. When Celle sent the concept to Nuccio Bertone, within weeks the Italian designer responded that this innovative setup went beyond what his firm could produce. When Bertone unveiled Gandini's Trapeze six years later, it differed from the patent in one way: the seats were not part of the chassis, but separate elements.

Thanks to this set up it was possible to reduce the distance between the two seating rows and to offer leg room to those sitting in the rear. On top of that, in terms of safety, the space between the front seats and the door established an element of protection in case of a side impact.

The Trapeze's nose had six rectangular headlights that folded away when not in use. There was an almost bumper-like band running all around the car, a side protection which later made its way to many production cars.

Although the Trapeze was constructed with components that were ready for production, the car never went into production because of the enormous costs for further developing the Wankel engine by NSU, its poor fuel economy, worsened by the fact that only a 3-speed manual transmission with automatic clutch was available, and the 1973 oil crisis, all factors that led the NSU to cease operations.

The Trapeze still exists in the Bertone collection, and was displayed during Époqu'auto in November 2024, together with 23 other Bertone concept cars.

== Gallery ==
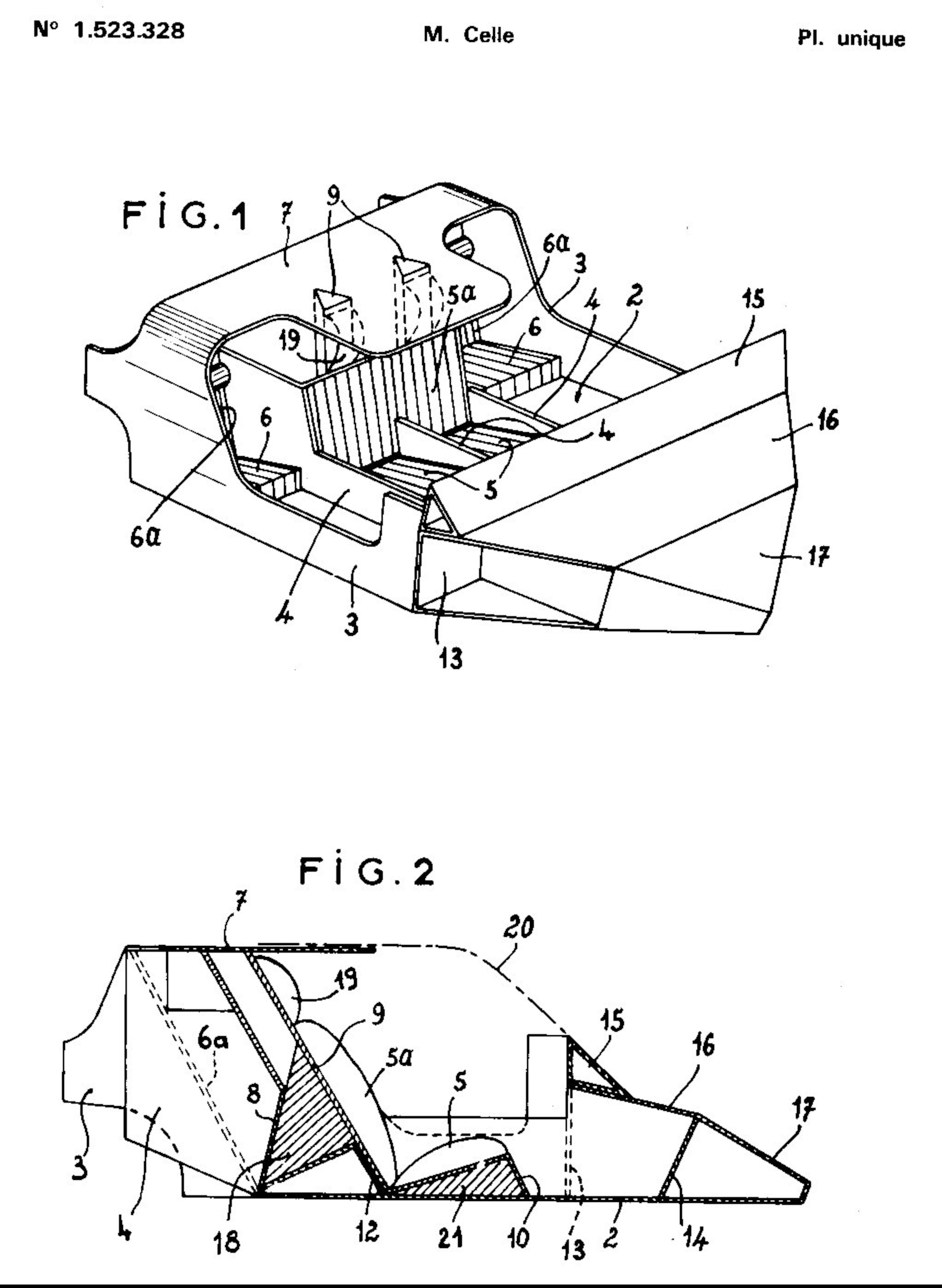
Jean Celle Patent drawing

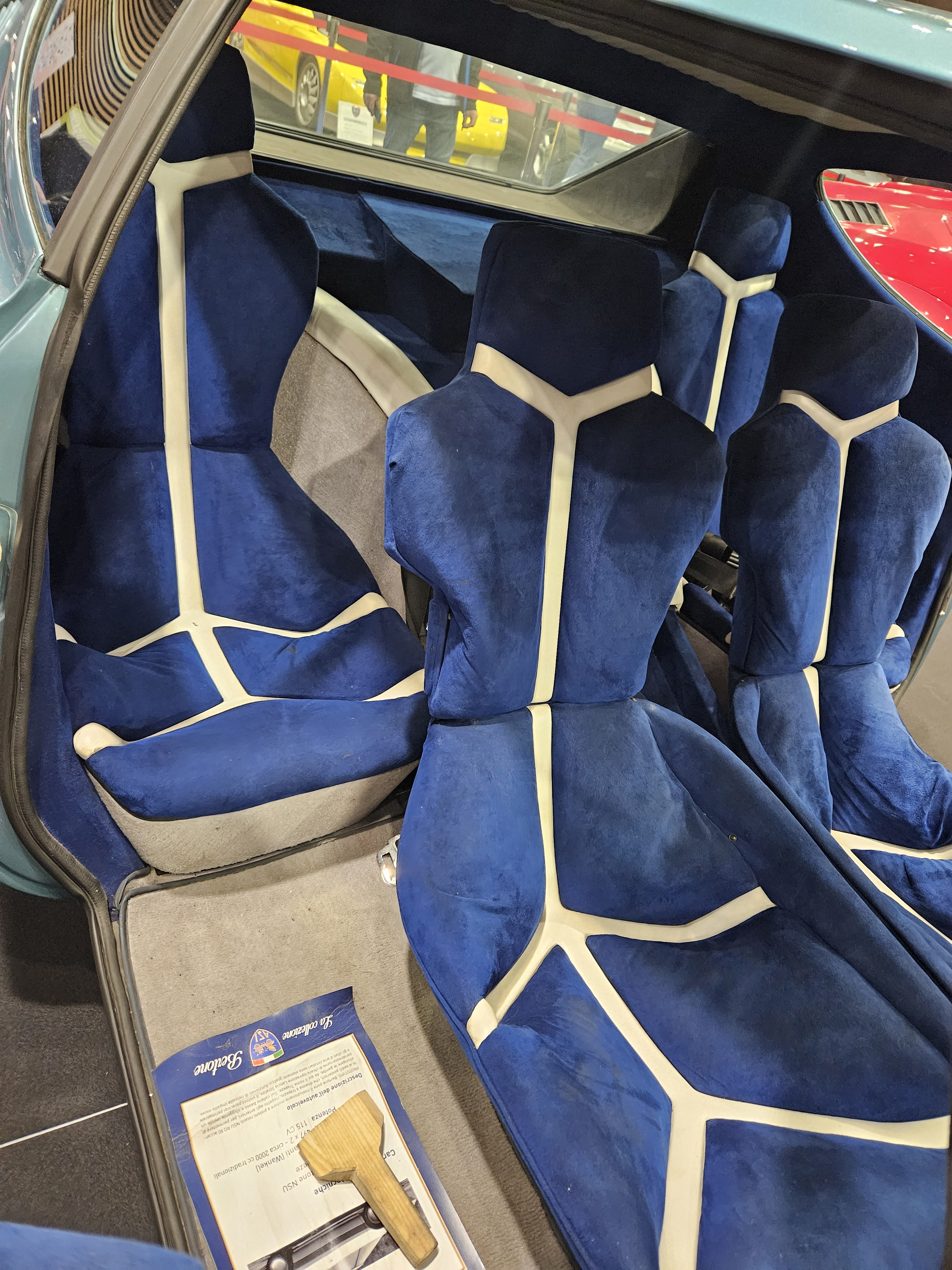
NSU Trapeze interior at 2024 Epoqu'auto in Lyon

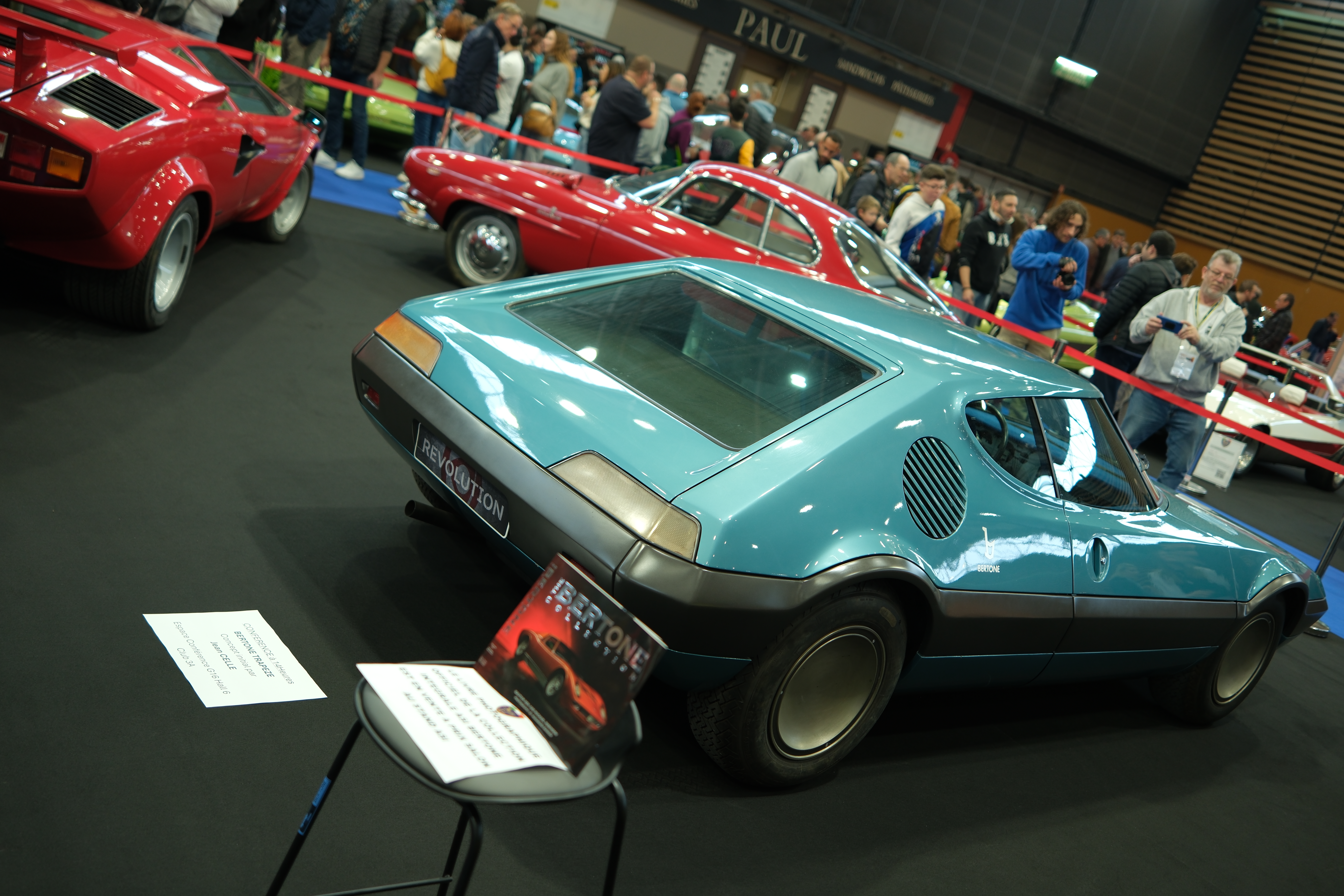
NSU Trapeze rear at 2024 Epoqu'auto in Lyon

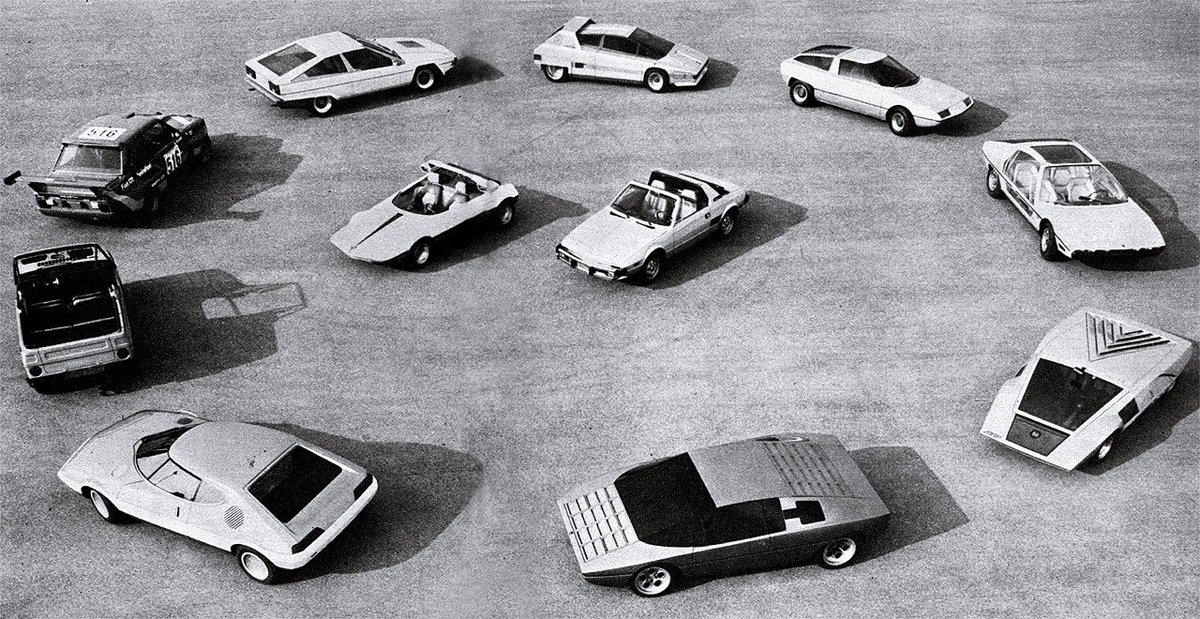
Bertone designs, left bottom: NSU Trapeze
