= Marcello Gandini =

Italian car designer (1938–2024)

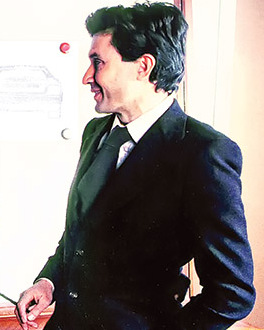
- Gandini in 1976
- Born: 26 August 1938; Turin, Italy
- Died: 13 March 2024 (aged 85); Rivoli, Italy
- Occupation: Automobile designer
- Known for: Lamborghini Miura; Lamborghini Countach; Lancia Stratos

Marcello Gandini (26 August 1938 – 13 March 2024) was an Italian car designer widely known for his work with the Italian car design house Bertone, where his work included designing the Alfa Romeo Carabo and Montreal, Lancia Stratos Zero, Maserati Khamsin, Ferrari GT4, Fiat X1/9, and multiple Lamborghinis, including the Miura, Countach, Espada, and Urraco production cars, as well as the Marzal and Bravo concept cars. Gandini himself said his design interests prioritised vehicle architecture, construction, assembly, and mechanisms over styling.

Car Design News awarded Gandini the magazine's first Lifetime Achievement Award in 2012, and said his stature within the industry could not be overstated. Flavio Manzoni, chief design officer at Ferrari, said Gandini was "probably the greatest car designer ever".

== Early life and education ==
Gandini was born in Turin on 26 August 1938 into a "family steeped in classical music". His father was a former orchestral conductor and composer and wanted his son to become a pianist. Gandini, however, developed an early and intense interest in cars and mechanical engineering. He was sent to a classical lyceum and studied the piano, but continued to have "a passion for engines, mechanics and technology" and left school at 18, which resulted in him being rejected by his parents.

== Career ==
In 1964, Gandini approached Nuccio Bertone, head of the Gruppo Bertone company, who was impressed by his zeal and wanted to apprentice him to Giorgetto Giugiaro, his chief designer. The following year Giorgetto left to start his own studio, and at the age of 27, Gandini was hired to take his place. He designed the Lamborghini Miura, from first sketch to finished prototype, in three months, and remained with the company for fourteen years.

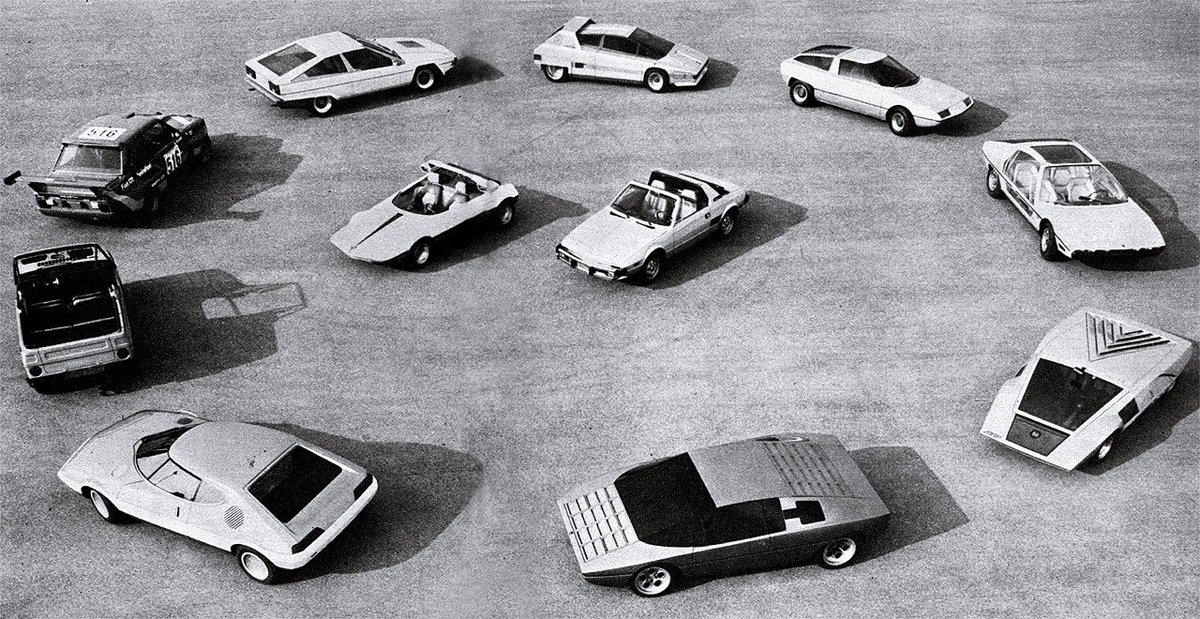
A lineup of Bertone designs from the 1960s and 1970s, most of which Gandini designed

Gandini created the 'Stile Bertone' styling house in Caprie. Turin, working as its general manager as well as designing concept cars, and managing the construction of prototype automobiles for the many car makers who hired Bertone, often specifically Gandini. Gandini is most known for his designs for many Lamborghini sports cars, beginning with the groundbreaking rear mid-engined Lamborghini Miura in the mid-1960s with a transversely mounted V12. He went on to design the Espada, Urraco, Countach, and the original design proposal for the Diablo, as well as a number of Lamborghini concept cars.

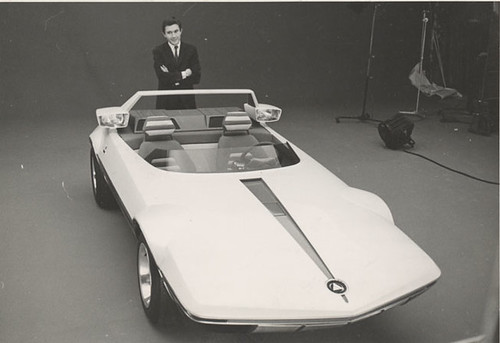
Gandini standing behind the Autobianchi A112 Runabout concept

Gandini also designed practical mass-production cars, including sub-compacts, such as the Innocenti Mini and the first generation Volkswagen Polo, as well as midsize family cars, such as the first-generation BMW 5 Series and Citroën BX. The Lancia Stratos rally sportscar, featuring a seamless semi-elliptic windshield and door glass combination, is also a Gandini design.

Gandini left Bertone in July 1979 to found his own design house, Clama, pursuing freelance automotive, industrial, and interior design. Gandini worked exclusively for Renault for the first five years, resulting in the second generation Renault 5 (the 'Supercinq') and the Renault Magnum truck. He later worked with Maserati, Nissan, Toyota, and Subaru, and returned to Lamborghini to work on the Diablo in the 1990s.

Gandini also designed in other areas, including home architecture, the design of a nightclub interior, and the body styling of the Heli-Sport CH-7 helicopter.

In January 2024, Gandini was recognised by the Polytechnic University of Turin with an honorary degree in mechanical engineering.

Gandini died on 13 March 2024, at the age of 85.

== Designs ==
Car designs that Gandini was involved in include:

- Alfa Romeo Montreal concept and production version
- Alfa Romeo 33 Carabo
- Alfa Romeo Navajo
- Audi 50
- Autobianchi A112
- Autobianchi A112 Runabout
- BMW 2800 Spicup (final design)
- BMW 2200 TI Garmisch
- BMW 5 Series (E12) (with Paul Bracq)
- Bugatti EB 110 (prototypes)
- Citroën BX
- Citroën GS Camargue (with Marc Deschamps)
- Cizeta-Moroder V16T
- De Tomaso Biguà (Qvale Mangusta)
- De Tomaso Pantera SI
- De Tomaso Pantera 2000 (aka Prossima Generazione)
- Dino/Ferrari 308 GT4
- Ferrari Rainbow
- Fiat 125 Executive (1967)
- Fiat 127 Village (1974)
- Fiat 128 Coupé (1969)
- Fiat 132
- Fiat Dino Coupé (final design)
- Fiat X1/9
- Fiat Visitors Bus (1975)
- Innocenti Mini
- Iso Lele
- Iso Grifo 90
- Iso Grifo 96
- Jaguar FT Coupé (1966, Bertone)
- Jaguar Pirana
- Jaguar Ascot (1977)
- Lamborghini Bravo
- Lamborghini Countach
- Lamborghini P140
- Lamborghini Diablo (initial design proposal)
- Lamborghini P147 Acosta
- Lamborghini Espada
- Lamborghini Jarama
- Lamborghini Miura
- Lamborghini Urraco
- Lamborghini Marzal
- Lancia Stratos Zero
- Lancia Stratos
- Lancia Sibilo
- Maserati Khamsin
- Maserati Ghibli II
- Maserati Quattroporte II (1974–1978) & IV (1994–2001)
- Maserati Shamal
- Maserati Chubasco
- 1st and 2nd Maserati Biturbo facelifts
- Nissan AP-X
- NSU Trapeze
- Perodua Kancil (facelift)
- Porsche 911 Roadster by Bertone (1966)
- Reliant FW11
- Renault 5 Turbo (with Marc Deschamps; interiors)
- Renault 5 Supercinq
- Renault Magnum
- Stola S81 Stratos
- Stola S86 Diamante
- TaMo Racemo (Moflex chassis technology only)
- Volkswagen Polo Mk1
- Volvo Tundra

=== Gallery of car designs ===
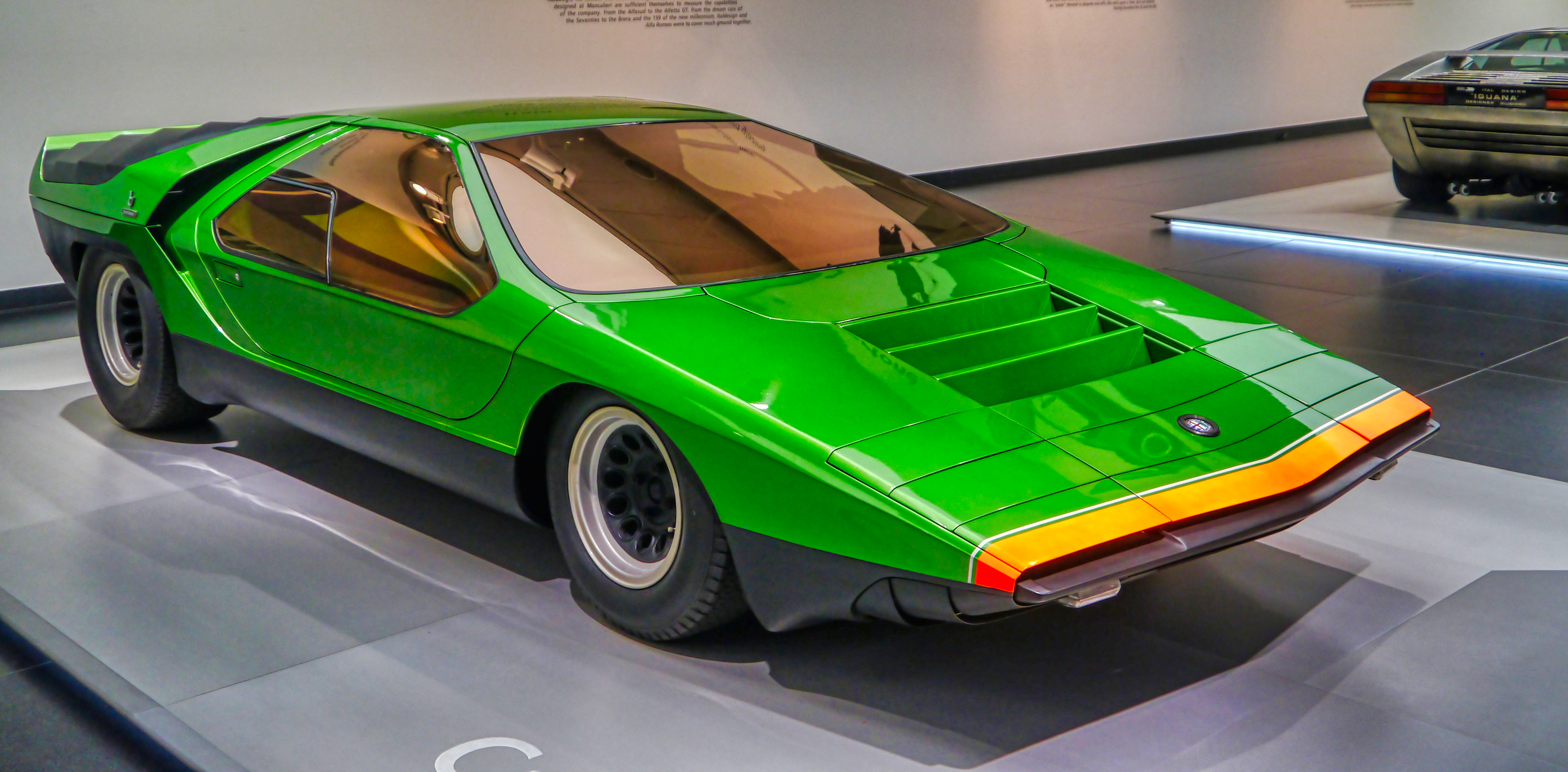
1968 Alfa Romeo Carabo concept

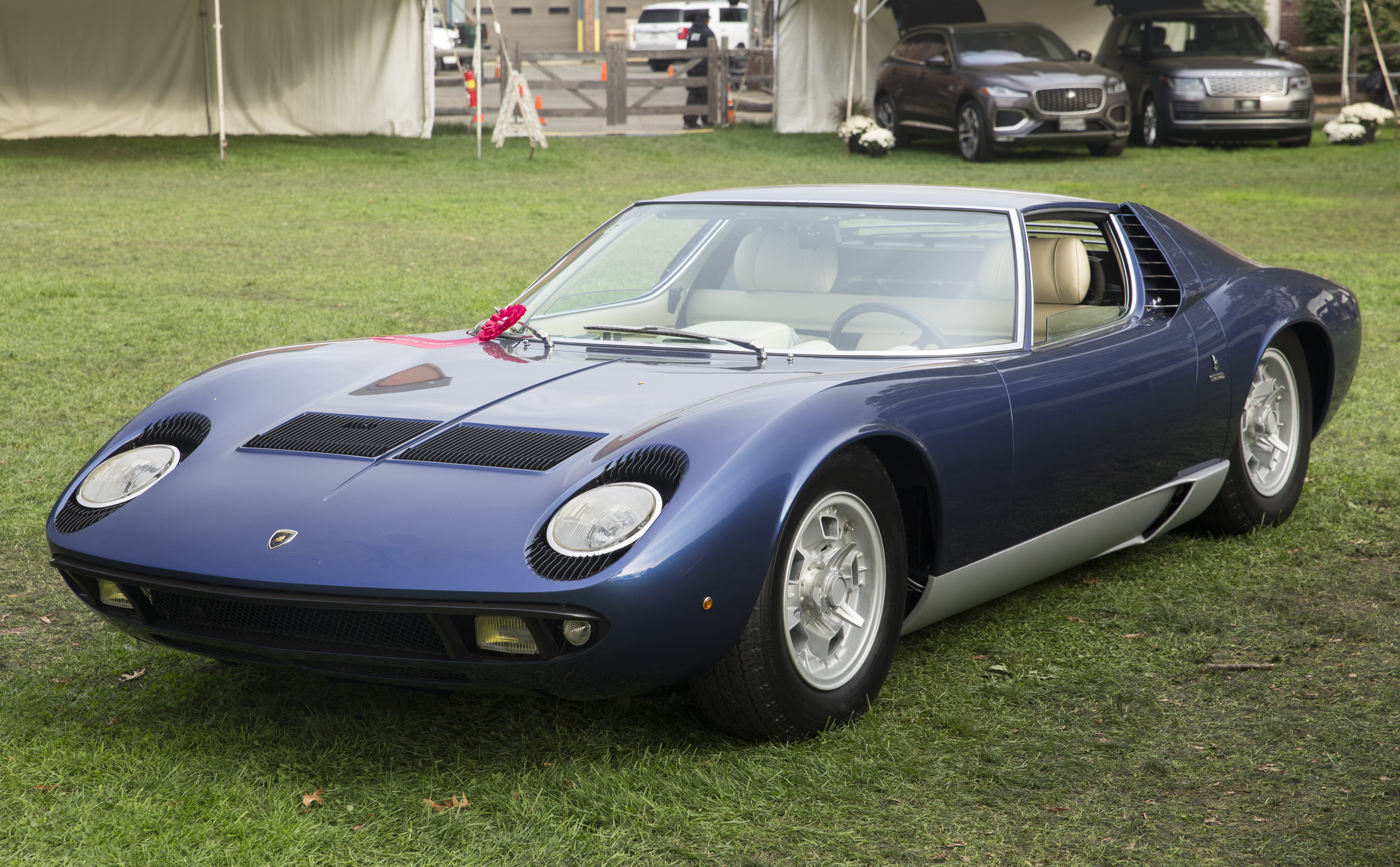
1969 Lamborghini Miura S

1970 BMW 2002ti Garmisch concept

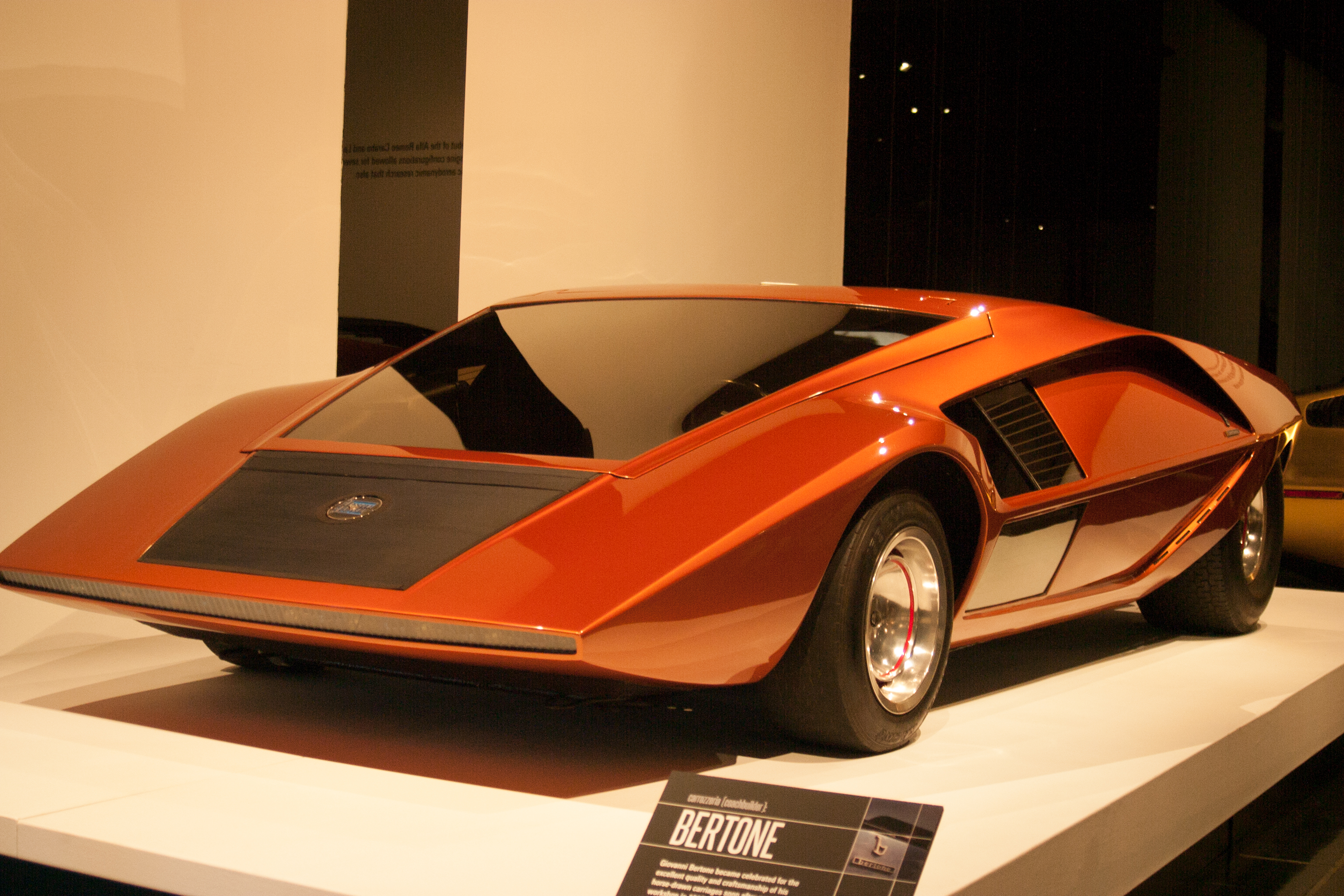
1970 Lancia Stratos Zero concept

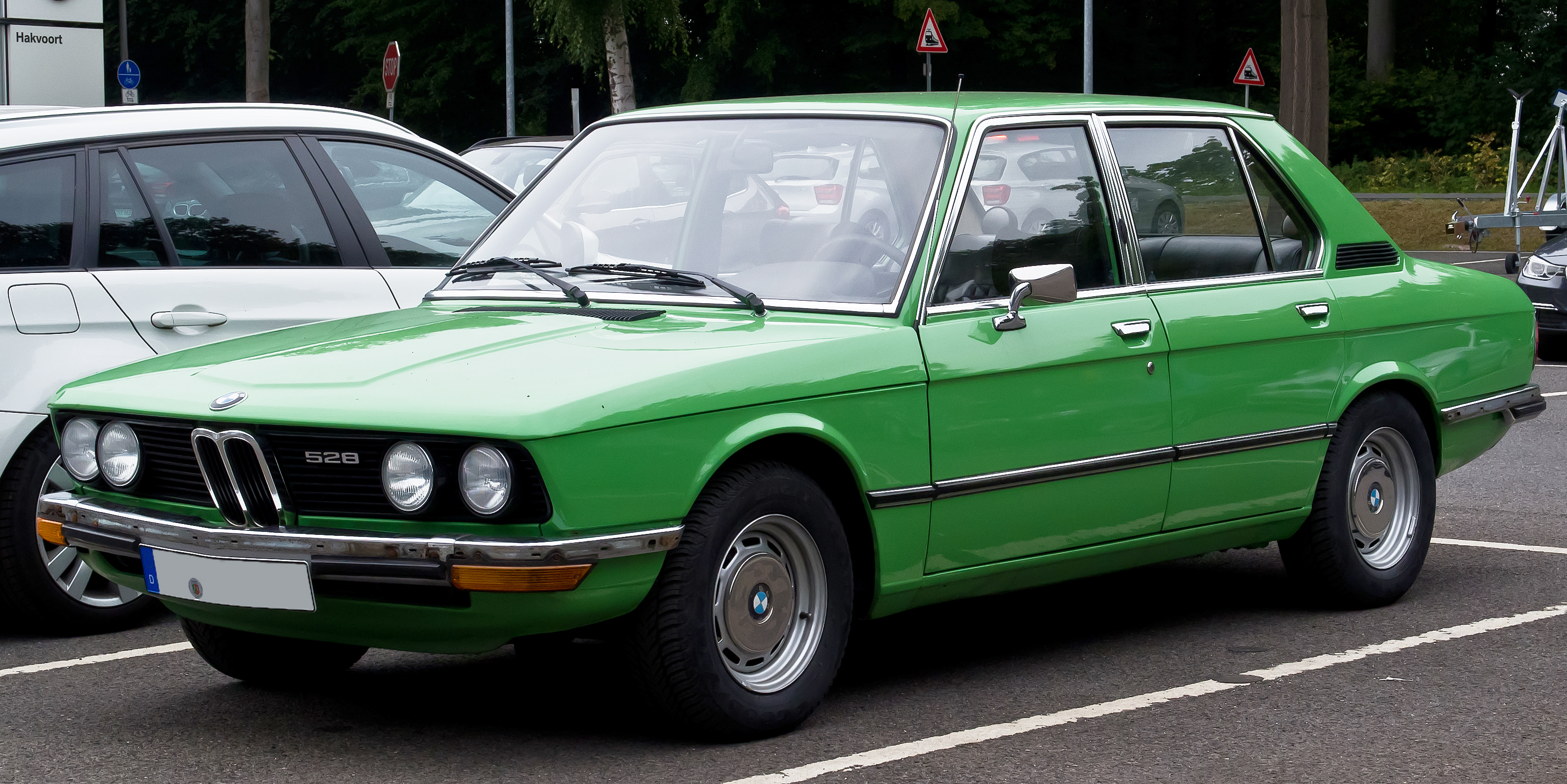
1972 BMW 5 Series (1st generation)

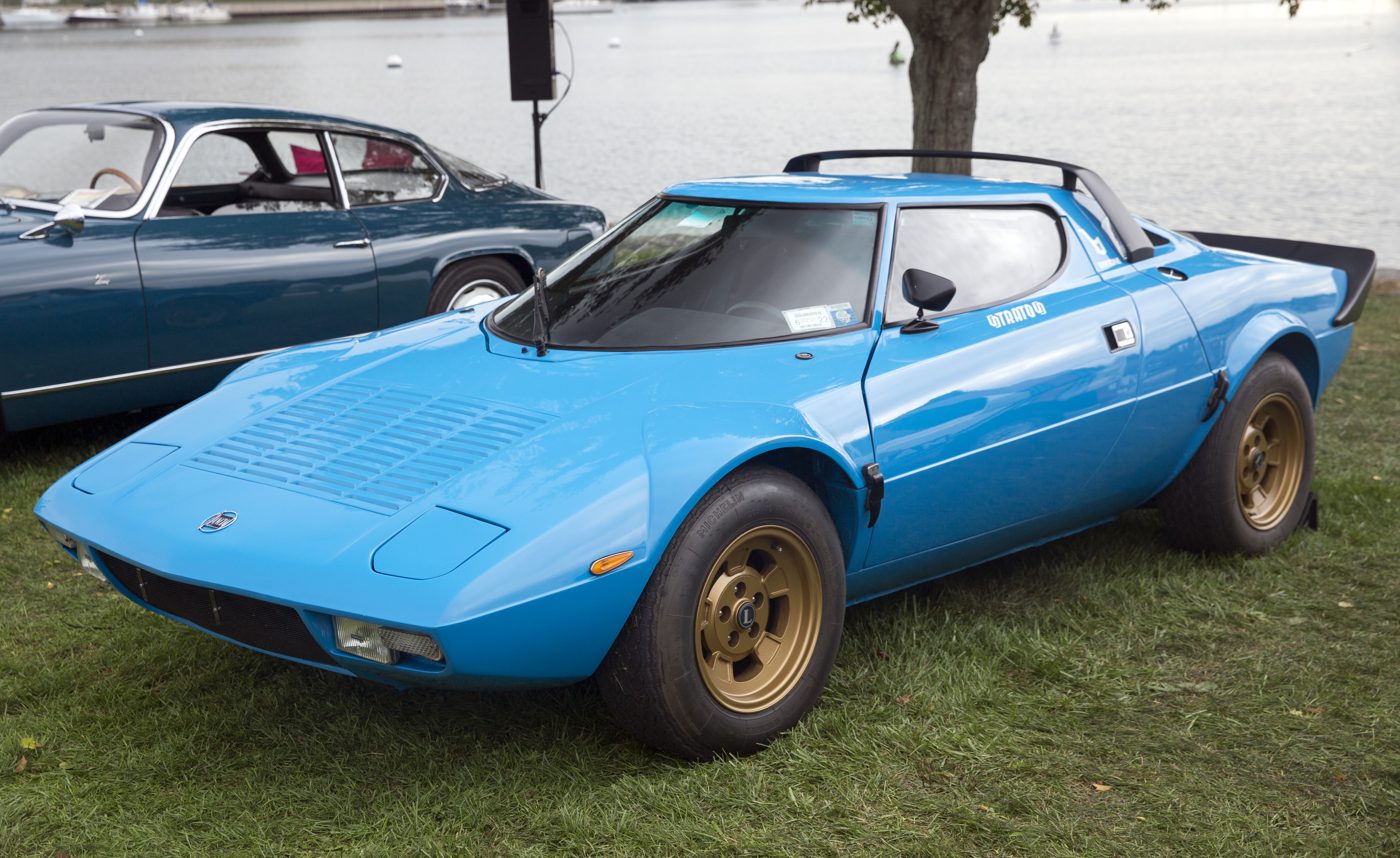
1974 Lancia Stratos

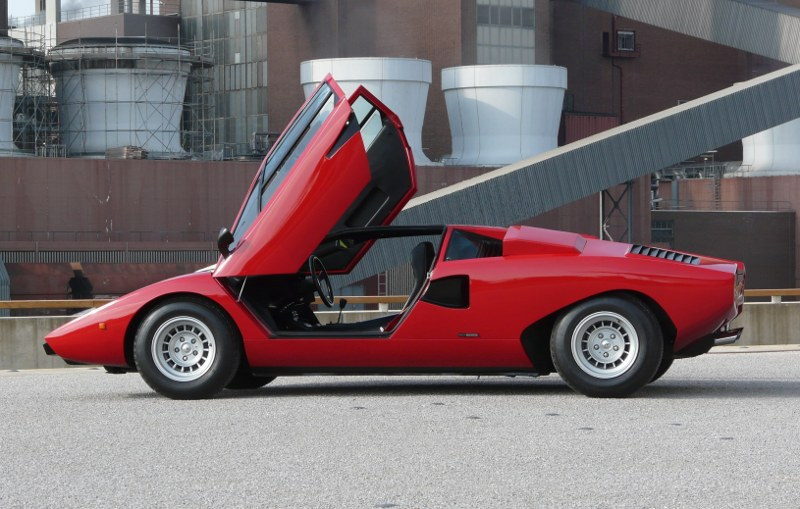
1974 Lamborghini Countach LP400

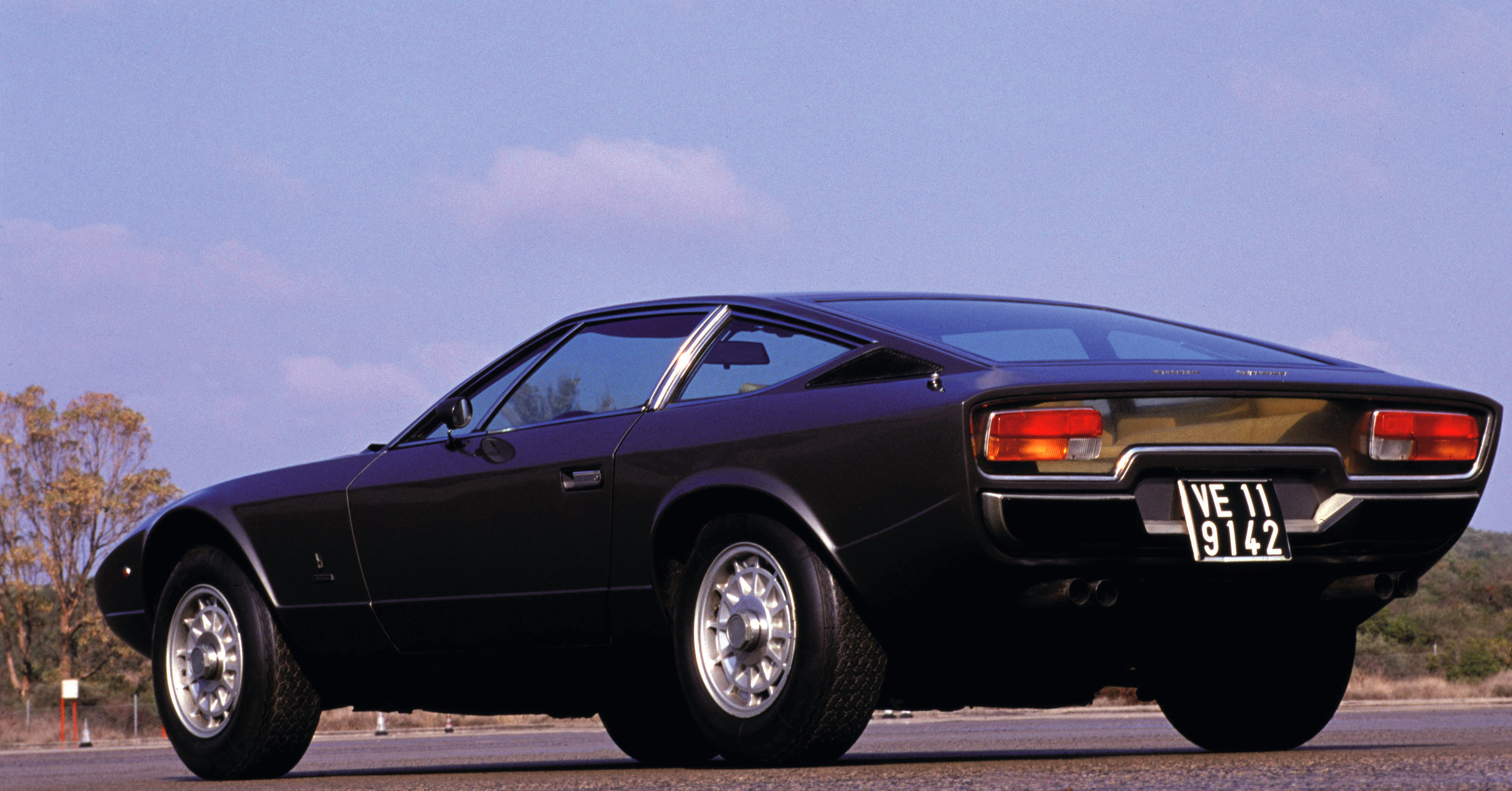
1974 Maserati Khamsin

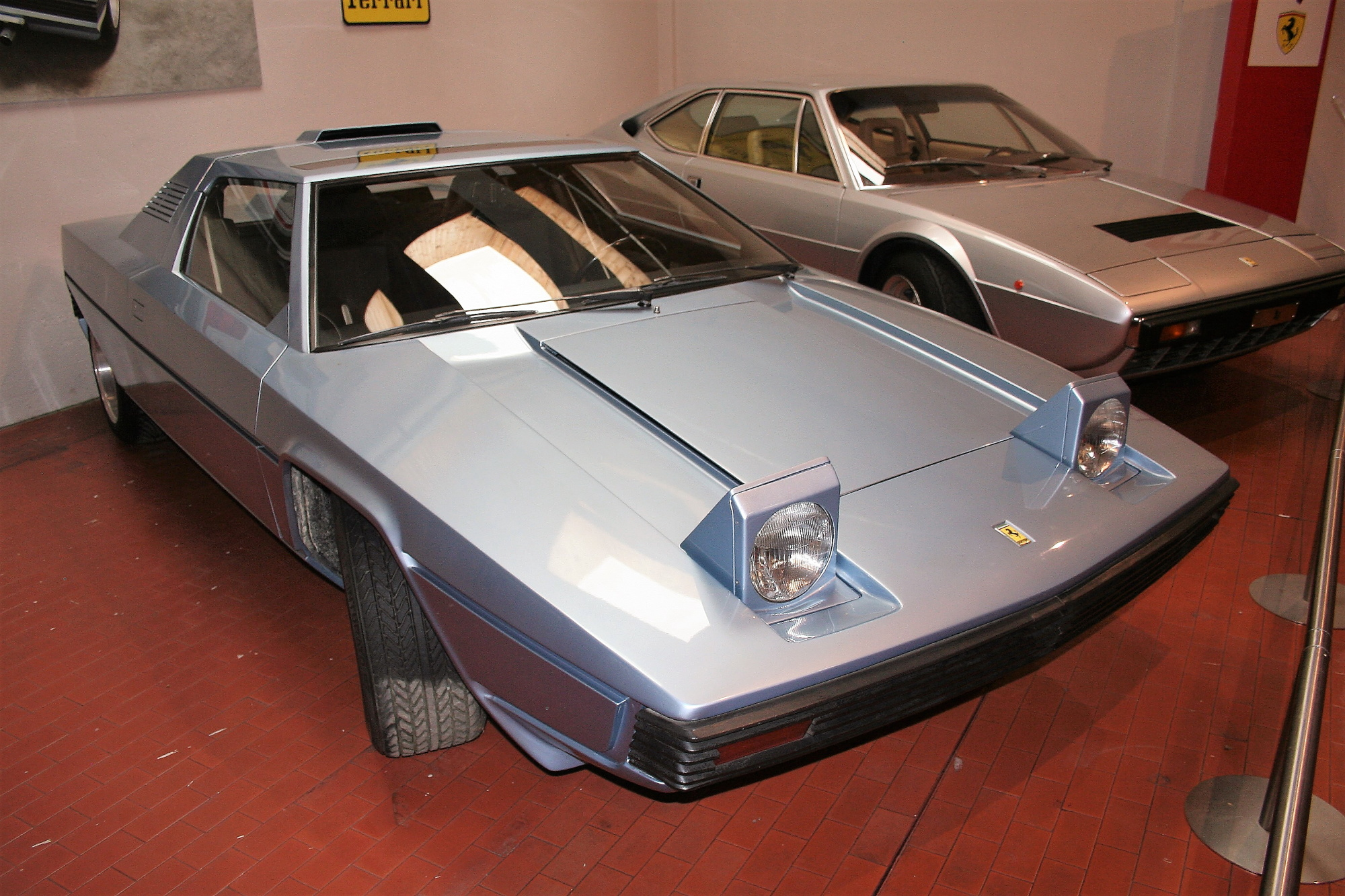
1976 Ferrari Rainbow concept at left, and 1973 Ferrari GT4 at right

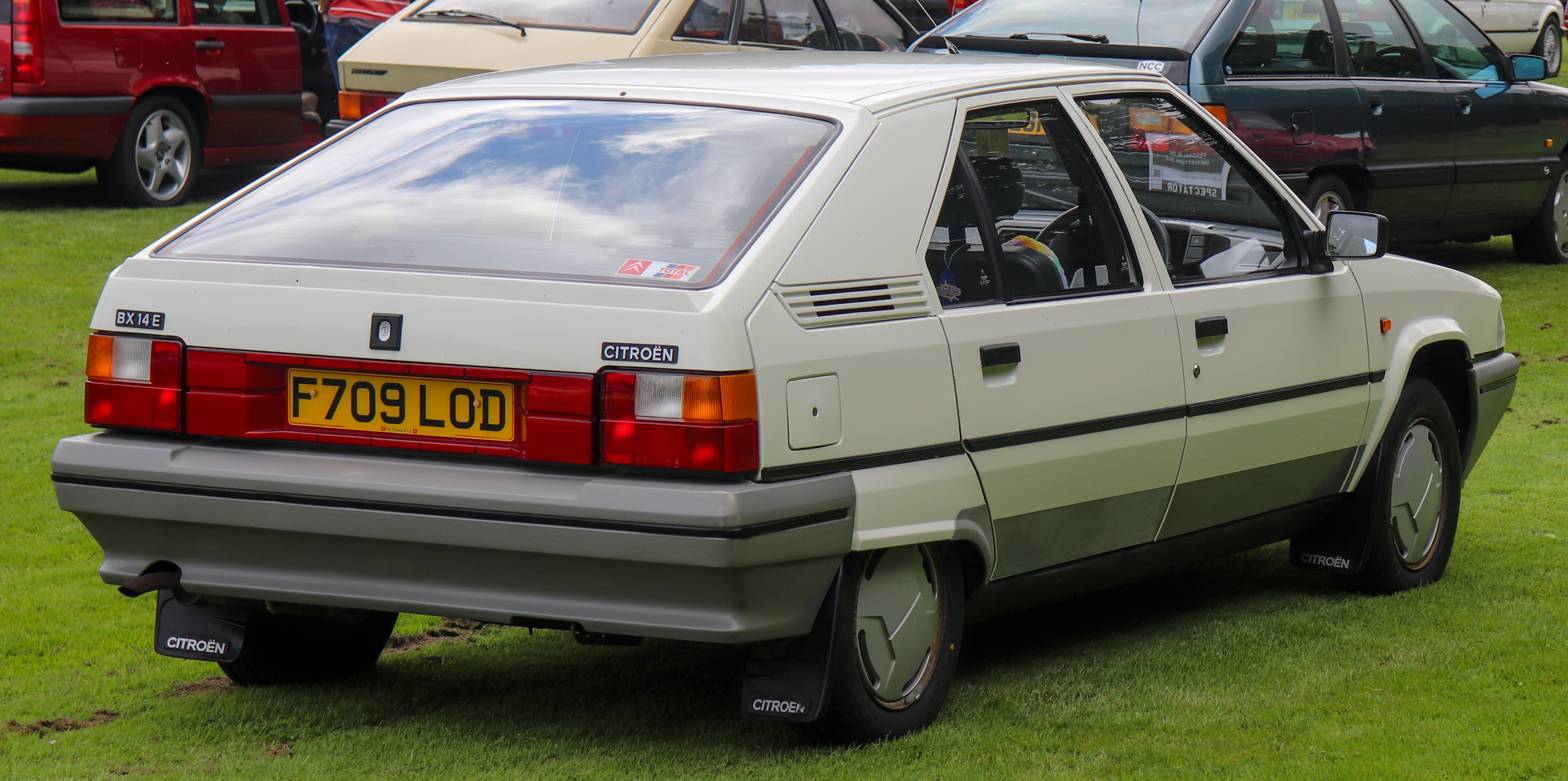
The Citroën BX hatchback became one of the best-selling Citroën models

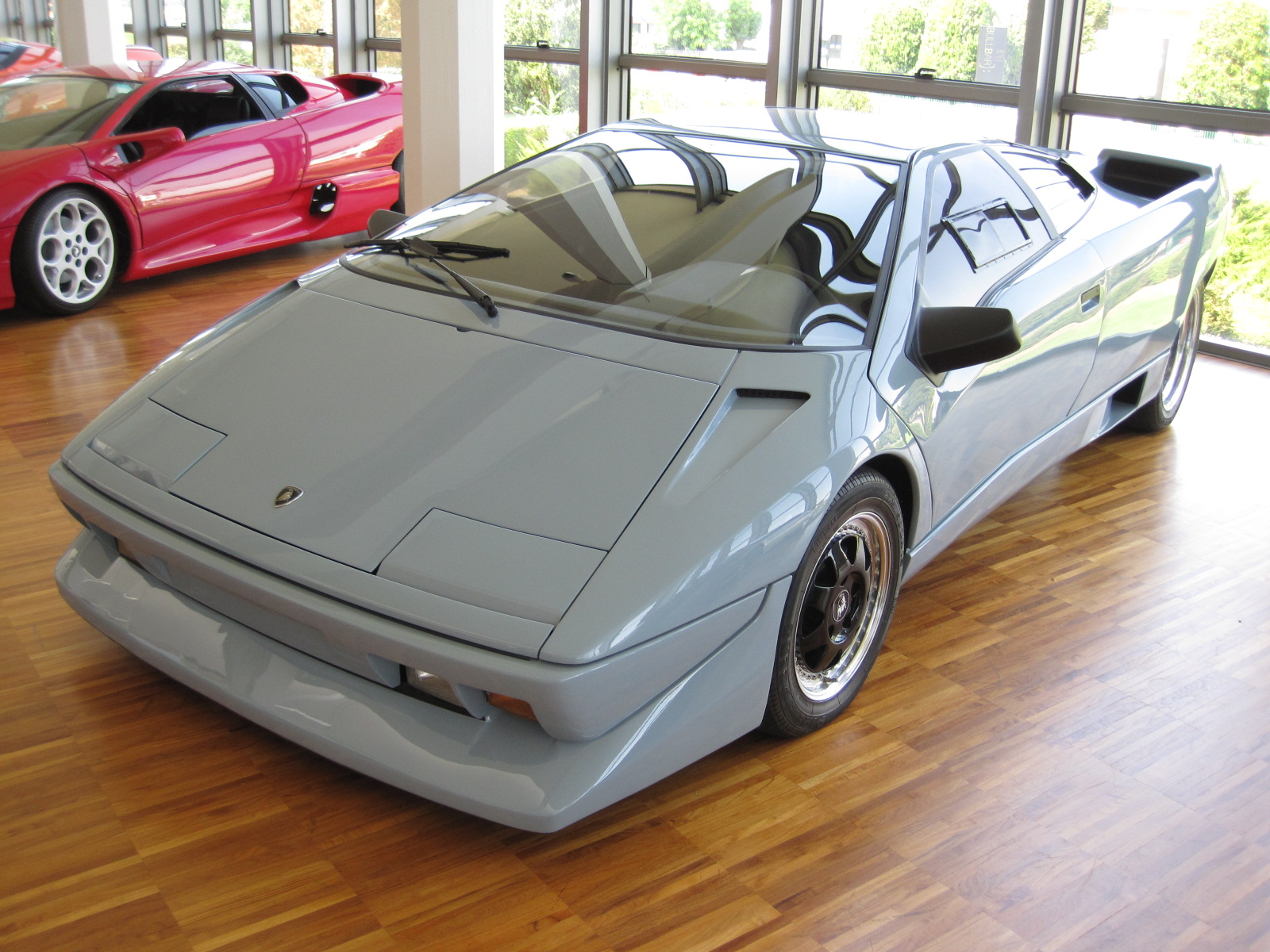
1986 Lamborghini Diablo P132 prototype

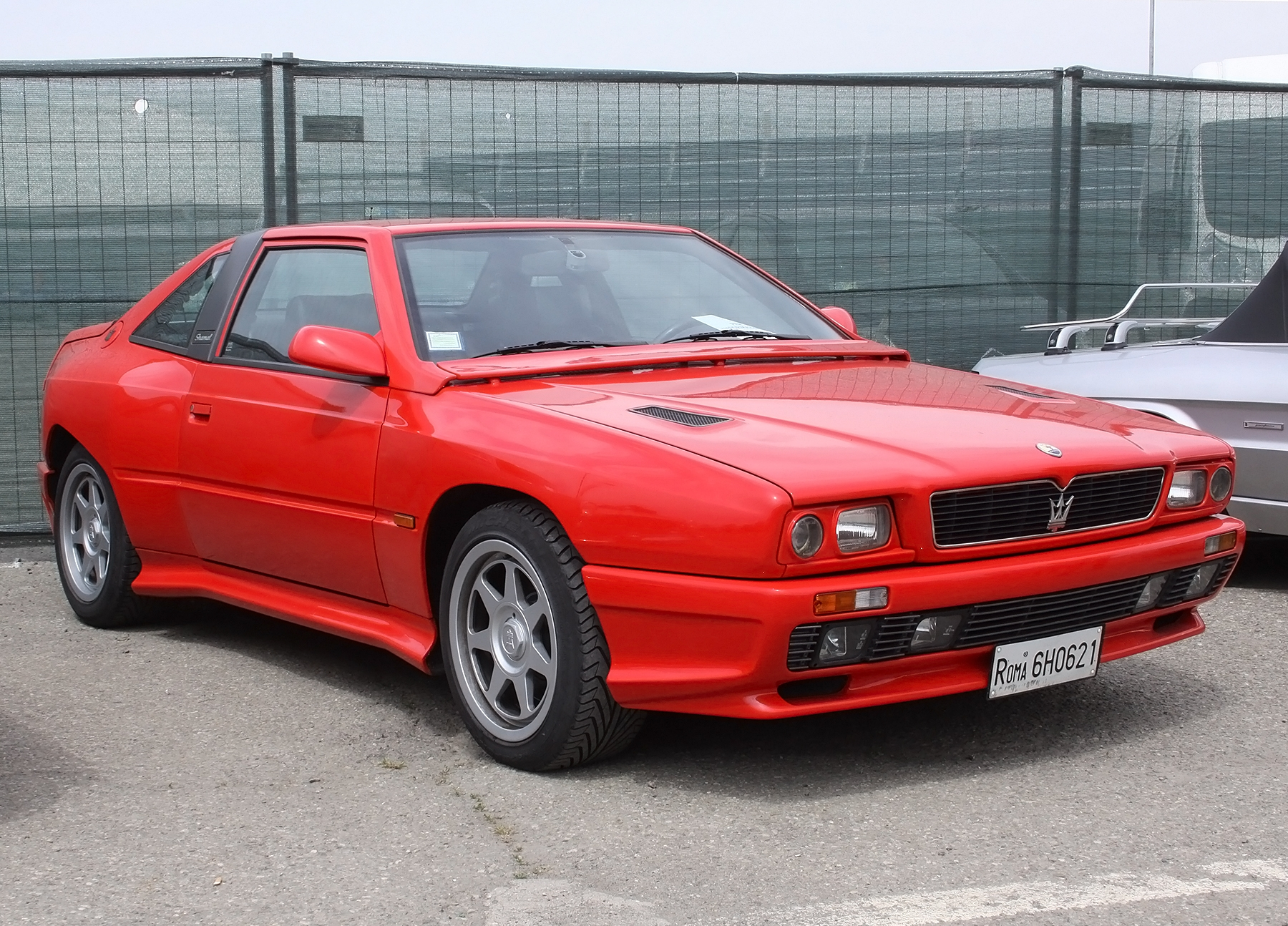
1990 Maserati Shamal

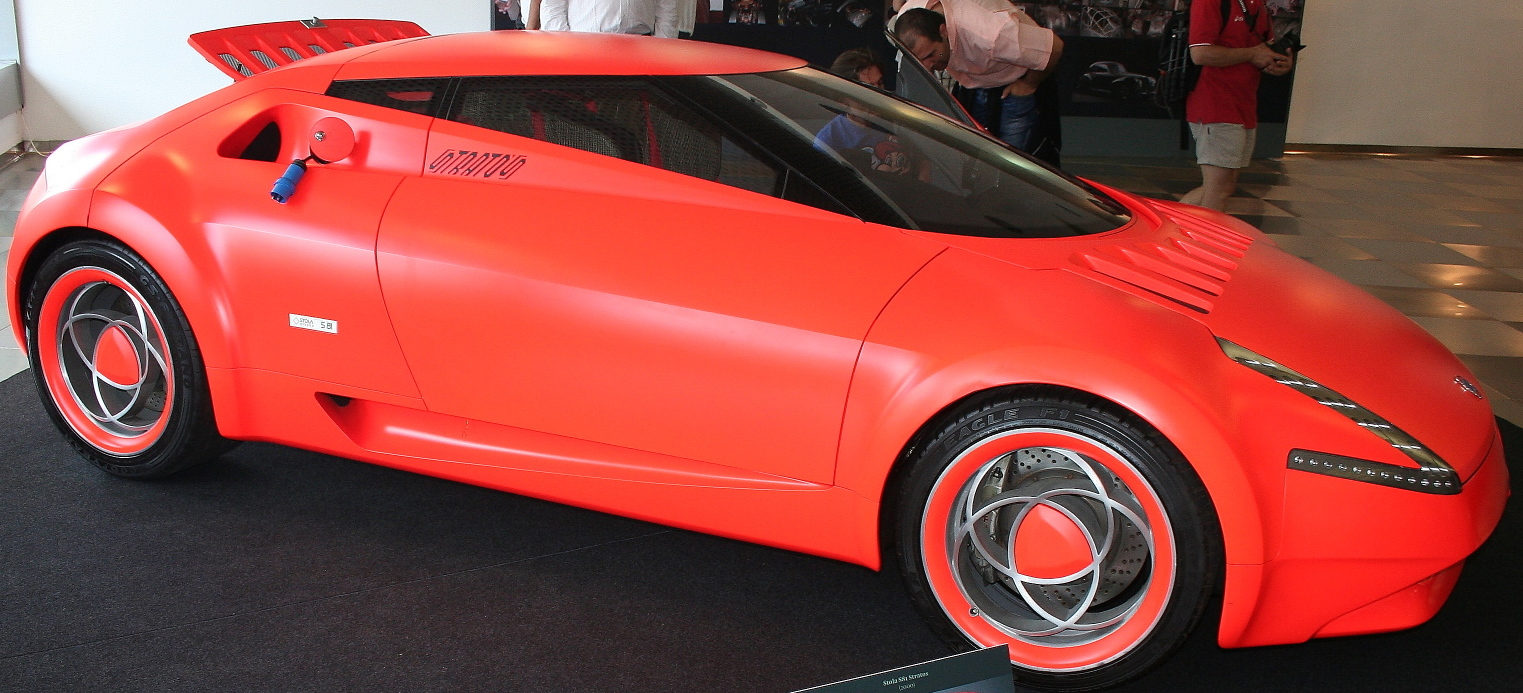
2000 Stola S81 Stratos concept
