= Lancia Stratos Zero =

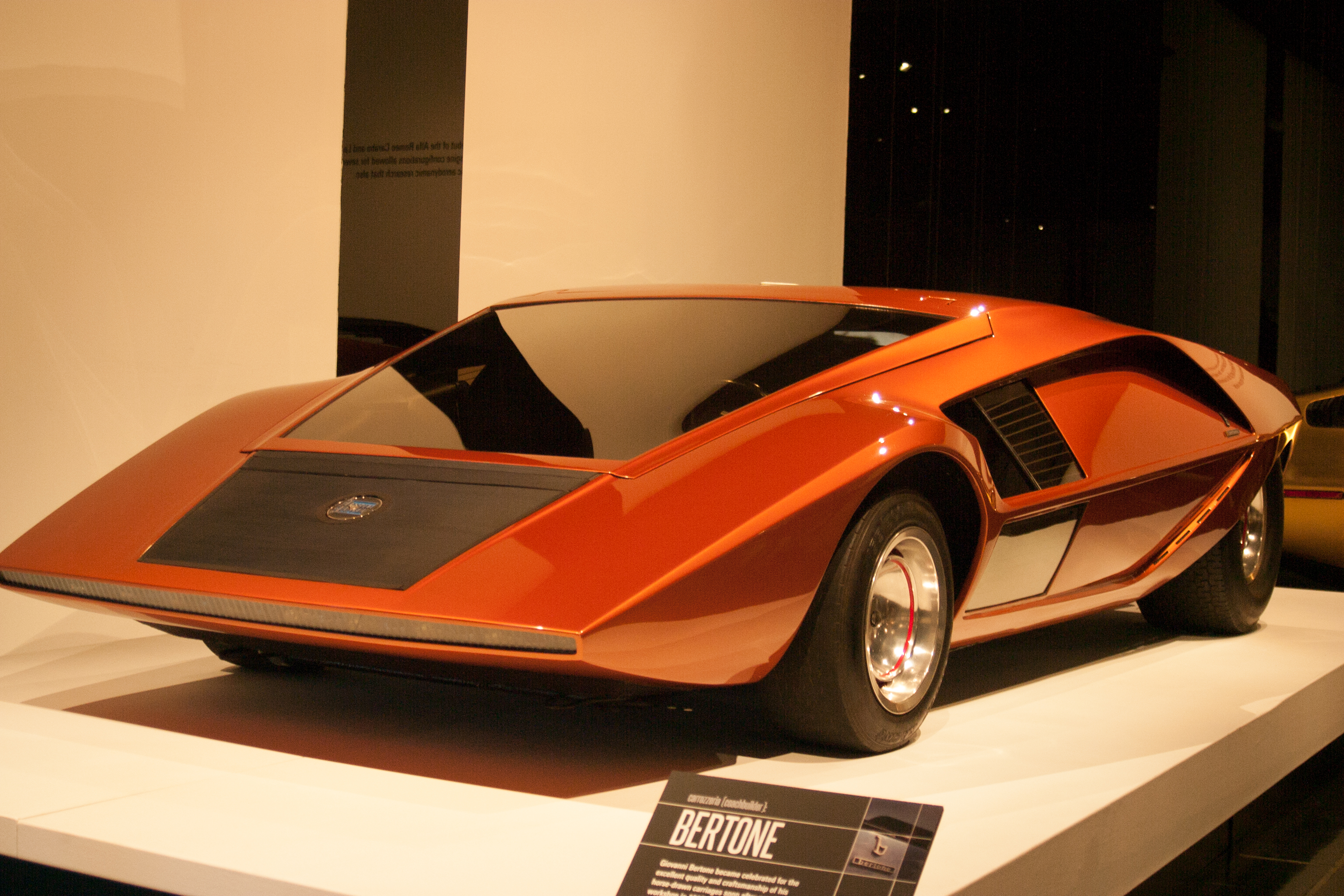

Overview
- Production: 1970
- Designer: Marcello Gandini at Bertone

Body and chassis
- Class: Concept car
- Body style: Hatch-top coupé

Powertrain
- Engine: 1,584 cc (1.6 L) Lancia Tipo 818.540 V4
- Transmission: 5-speed manual

Dimensions
- Wheelbase: 2,220 mm (87.4 in)
- Length: 3,581 mm (141.0 in)
- Width: 1,727 mm (68.0 in)
- Height: 846 mm (33.3 in)

The Lancia Stratos Zero or Lancia Stratos HF Zero is a concept sports car from the Italian automobile manufacturers Bertone and Lancia. It was presented at the 1970 Turin Auto Show, predating the introduction of the Stratos HF prototype by 1 year, and the production Lancia Stratos by three years. It is currently owned by Phillip Sarofim.

== History ==
The Stratos Zero was designed by Marcello Gandini, the chief designer at Bertone. They called it "Stratos 0" after the space-age stratosphere then in vogue at the time.

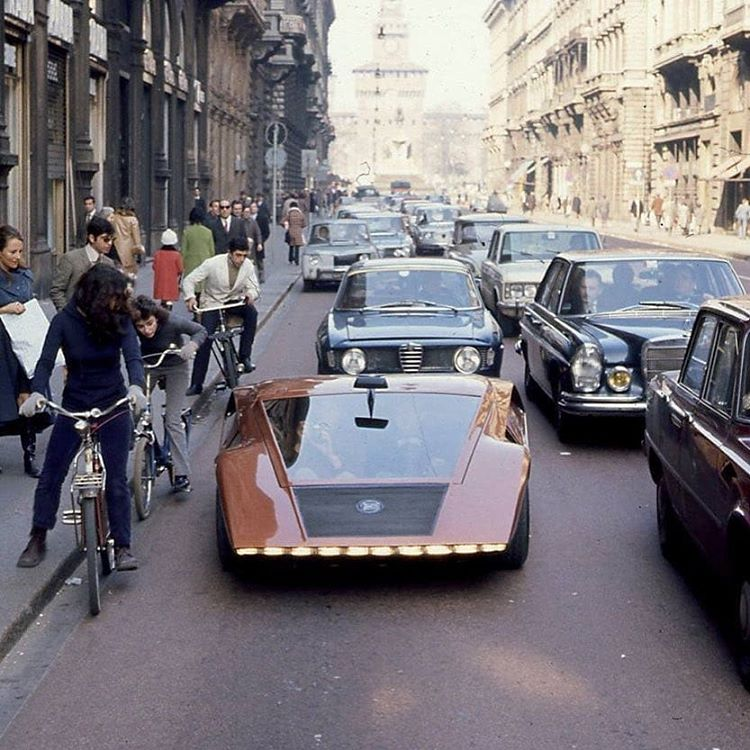
In Milan, 1970

It was successfully used for marketing by Scuderia Lancia in relation with its Lancia Stratos (and GT Stradale road car) version which was produced in 492 units between 1973 and 1978, and featured a Ferrari Dino 246 GT/GTS (1969) 2.4 liter V6 engine for a power output of 142 kW (190 PS; 187 hp), which led to a series of wins and domination of the world rally championships in 1974, 1975 and 1976.

=== Chassis and body ===
The Stratos Zero was built by Bertone using the chassis of a crashed Lancia Fulvia HF1600 rally car.

At Villa d'Este, Cernobbio, 2018

Its angular trapezoidal futuristic science fiction design (for its time) is ultra low and aerodynamically shaped, with a height of only 84 centimeters. The bodywork is made of fiberglass, with an original copper color scheme, a fastback rear body shape, a retractable steering wheel for easier access to the cockpit, a flip-open front-windshield door, and integrated bucket seats. The instrumentation was on a digital control screen, which was visionary at the time.

The aeronautical design is inspired, among other things, by the supersonic planes of the time and by competing concept cars. The Stratos Zero in turn may have inspired a number of other subsequent concept and production car designs.

=== Engine ===
The Lancia Stratos Zero is driven by a mid-rear mounted Lancia V4 engine from a Lancia Fulvia HF1600 Rally, with a displacement of 1.6 liters, producing 86 kW (115 PS; 113 hp).

== Display ==
The concept car was exhibited for a long time at the Bertone museum near Turin. It was sold at auction, among others, at the 2011 Concorso d'Eleganza Villa d'Este elegance competition, and has since been exhibited by its various successive private owners in various elegance competitions and car museums around the world. In 2023, Lancia Stratos Zero has been filmed in one such exhibition at Sankt Moritz, Switzerland.

On August 18th, 2024, the Stratos Zero was entered into the Pebble Beach Concours d'Elegance, competing in the "Wedge-shaped Concept Cars and Prototypes (Early)" class. In addition to winning 1st place in this class and being one of four contenders for Best in Show, Kazunori Yamauchi awarded the Zero 2024's Gran Turismo Special Award.

Since July 2025, it has been on display at the Petersen Automotive Museum in Los Angeles, California as part of the museum's The Wedge Revolution exhibit.

== Appearances ==
The Lancia Stratos Zero appears in the 1988 Michael Jackson musical film Moonwalker by Jerry Kramer and Colin Chilvers. In the "Smooth Criminal" section, when the character of Jackson is cornered by gangsters, he turns into a bulletproof Lancia Stratos Zero and gets away.

In 2025, Hot Wheels released a 1/64 scale die-cast version of the car.
