= Tamo Racemo =

Tata Tamo Racemo
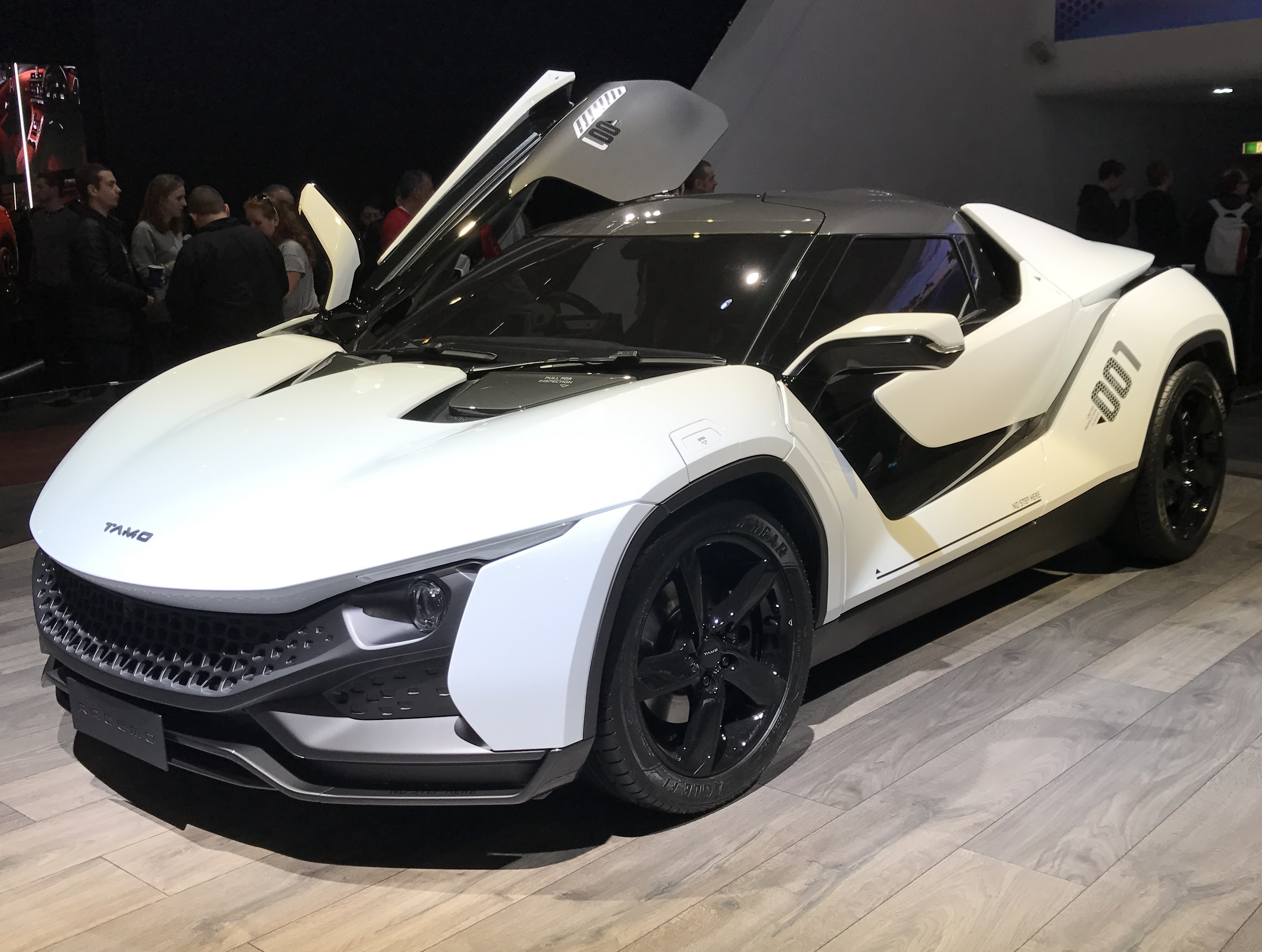

Overview
- Manufacturer: Tata Motors
- Production: 2017 (Cancelled)
- Designer: Tata Motors Design Studio, India

Body and chassis
- Class: Concept car
- Body style: 2-door coupé
- Layout: MR layout
- Doors: Butterfly

Powertrain
- Engine: three cylinder 1.2L Revotron Turbo petrol (also Racemo+ EV)
- Transmission: 6-speed semi-automatic

Dimensions
- Wheelbase: 2,430 mm (95.7 in)
- Length: 3,835 mm (151 in)
- Width: 1,810 mm (71 in)
- Height: 1,208 mm (48 in)

The Tata Tamo Racemo is a sports coupé concept developed by Tata Motors under sub-brand TaMo. It was unveiled at 87th Geneva Motor Show.

== Specifications ==
The Racemo was planned to be the first car launched under the sub-brand name TaMo. Two variants were planned; a road-based Racemo and a track-ready Racemo+. The Racemo used a special chassis design that Tata called "Moflex", made from a composite multi material sandwich structure. This technology was created by Italian car designer Marcello Gandini, who sold Tata the rights to the technology in 2007. Tata planned to use a turbocharged petrol engine producing 190 bhp (142 kW), allowing for a 0-60 mph time of 6 seconds, but due to cost cutting at Tata, the TaMo project was cancelled.

== Tamo Racemo 003 ==
The Tamo Racemo 003 was the planned electric version of the Racemo.

== Gallery ==
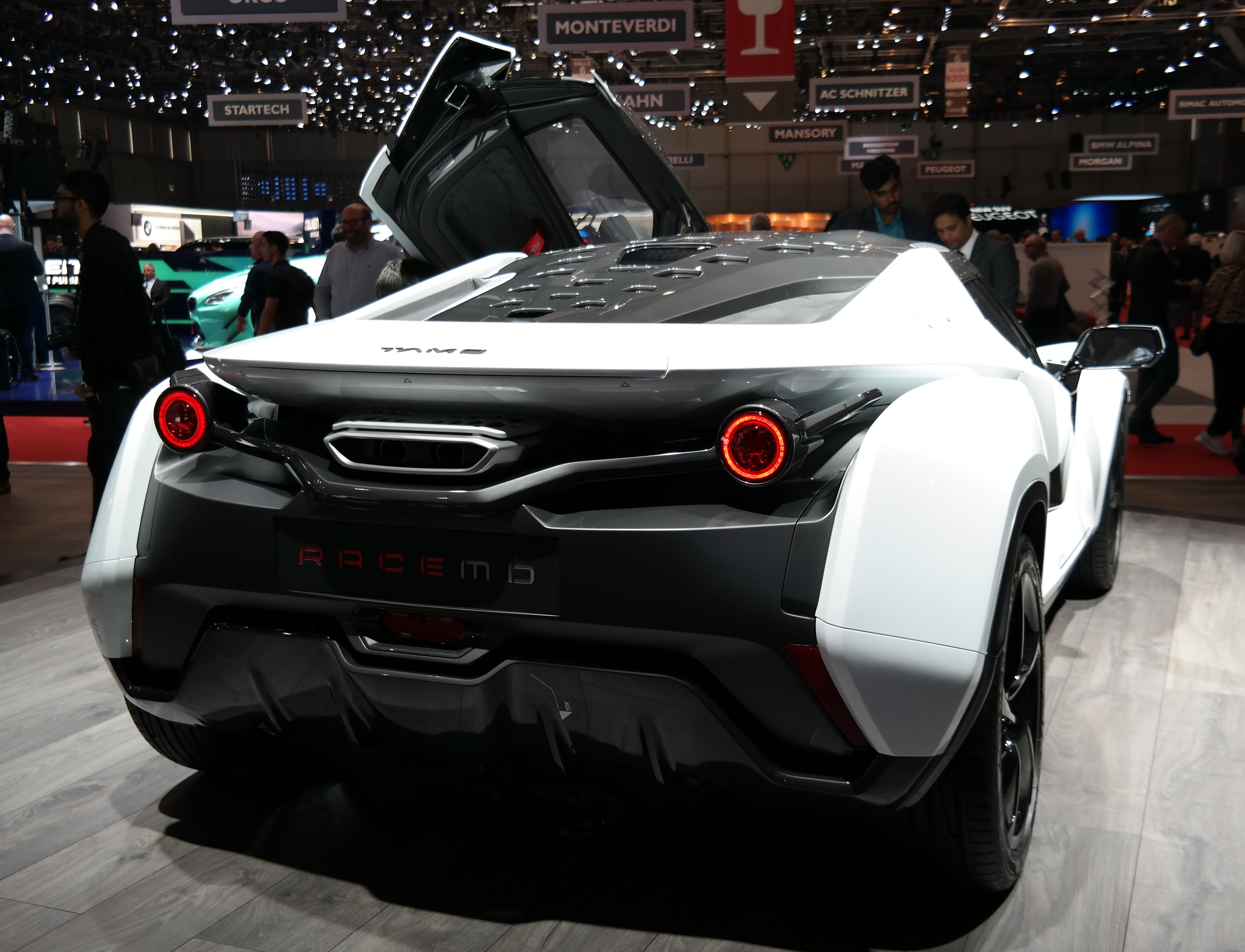
Racemo rear view
