= Autobianchi A112 Runabout =

Concept car designed by Bertone

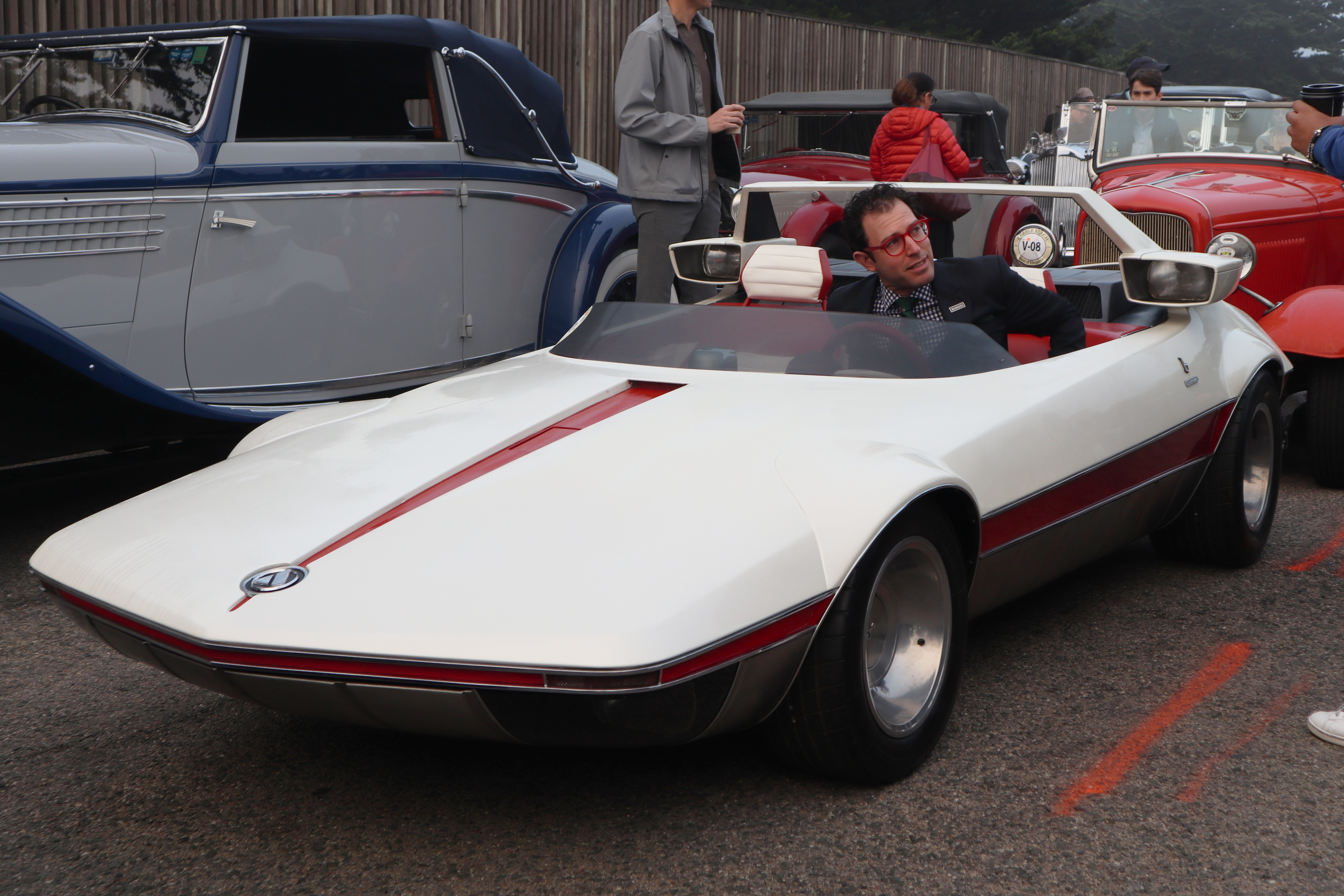

Overview
- Also called: Autobianchi Bertone Runabout
- Production: 1969
- Designer: Marcello Gandini at Bertone

Body and chassis
- Class: Concept car
- Body style: Barchetta
- Layout: Transverse mid-engine, rear wheel drive
- Platform: Autobianchi A112

Powertrain
- Engine: 1,116 cc (1.1 L) I4
- Transmission: 4-speed manual

The Autobianchi A112 Runabout is a concept car developed by Bertone and first shown in 1969. The small two-seat, mid-engined car was the inspiration for the Fiat X1/9 that appeared in 1972.

== History ==
In 1967 designer Pio Manzù showed his mid-engined Prototipo 111 based on the transverse powertrain from the Autobianchi A111 sedan, and one year later displayed his Autobianchi Coupé at the Turin Auto Show. A similar design that used the powertrain from the Autobianchi Primula was done by Dante Giacosa at Società industriale ricerche automobilistiche (SIRA - Automotive Industry Research Company), with initial fabrication done by OSI, and a full prototype called the G31 built later by Centro Stylo Fiat in 1969.

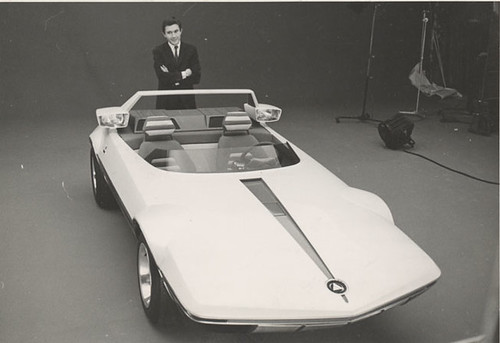
Designer Marcello Gandini with the Runabout

The Autobianchi A112 Runabout was designed by Marcello Gandini at Bertone. This small barchetta used the same transverse mid-engine layout as the much larger and more exotic Lamborghini Miura of 1966, which had also been designed by Gandini. The Runabout also exhibited the pronounced wedge shaped profile that would distinguish many of Gandini's designs from this time, including the 1968 Alfa Romeo Carabo.

With Fiat planning the end of the Fiat 850 product line, Bertone needed a car to replace the 850 Spider that it was building for Fiat at their Grugliasco factory. Around this time there was also growing concern that the United States would shortly implement rollover safety requirements that would effectively ban traditional convertibles.

The Runabout, with chassis number 41258, debuted at the 1969 Turin Auto Show, which ran from 29 October 1969 to 9 November 1969.

Gianni Agnelli saw the Runabout in 1971, and approved developing it into the X1/9.

In September 2015 ownership of the Runabout passed to Automotoclub Storico Italiano (ASI - "Italian Historical Automobile Club"), when the club acquired the Bertone Carrozzeria collection.

On August 20, 2022, the Runabout participated in the Pebble Beach Concours d'Elegance, entered into the L-2 Postwar Preservation Class, and was named the winner of the Gran Turismo special award by Kazunori Yamauchi.

== Features ==
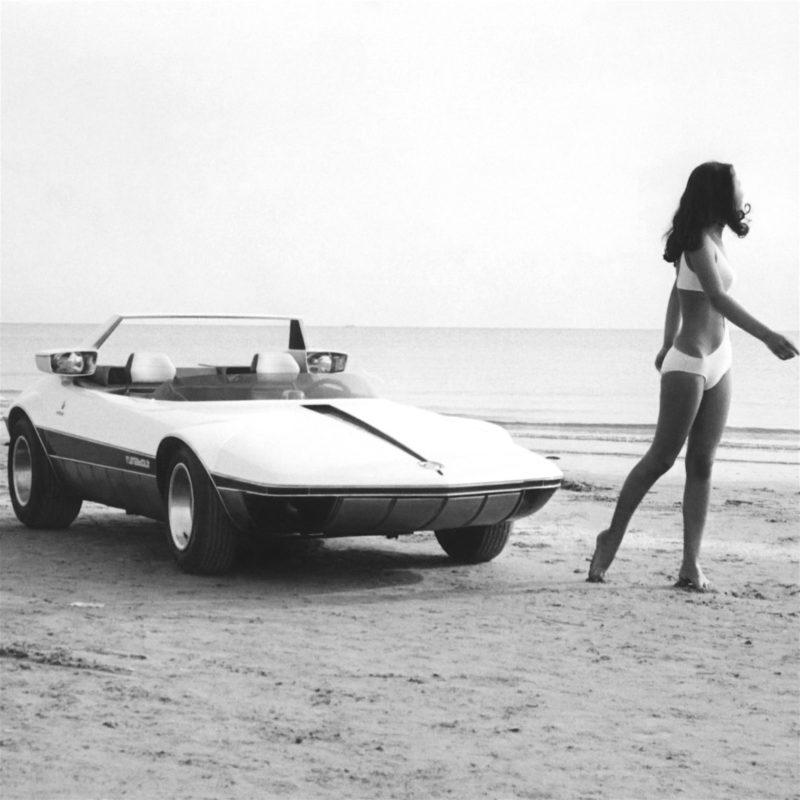
Bertone Runabout concept

The overall shape of the car was inspired by the racing boats of the mid-1960s. The hood was long and flat with a tapering central indentation and an Autobianchi badge inset just back of the tip. There was also a full-length indented feature at the plimsoll-line. The car's rear aspect was reminiscent of a boat's transom with a shallow well. The front overhang was long, but the rear was short. The wide, low profile tires and wheels were enclosed under nearly flat wheel arches. There were no doors on the passenger or driver sides. The only items above the sill line were a low clear curved wind deflector and a foil-shaped forward-swept rollbar similar in appearance to the radar arches on some boats. The rollbar gave the car the appearance of a targa top. The headlamps were not mounted in the nose of the car. Instead they were in prominent nacelles incorporated into the lower legs of the rollbar/arch, behind the occupants' seats.

On the interior, the only instrumentation was a speedometer, in the style of a nautical compass, mounted in the centre of the top of the dashboard.

Although named for the Autobianchi A112 Supermini and retaining that car's transverse engine configuration, the Runabout did not use the A112's Tipo 100 overhead valve engine. Instead, it received the new-for-1969 Fiat 128 SOHC engine that had been developed for the Fiat 128 by former Ferrari engine designer Aurelio Lampredi. This engine featured a cast-iron block, aluminum cylinder head and a belt-driven single overhead camshaft. The engine in the Runabout displaced 1,116 cc (68.1 cu in). It was mated to a transverse four speed manual transmission.

== Influence ==
Some point to the G31 as leading to the X1/9. Others suggest that the 1971 De Tomaso 1600 Spider, which was startlingly similar to the later X1/9, was the predecessor. In the De Tomaso's case it has been suggested that this was either imitation as a form of flattery, or an elaborate joke at Fiat's expense. Regardless, the Runabout is generally considered to have been the inspiration for the X1/9, which is how it was described on Bertone's own website.

Elements of the Runabout's design have also been noted in the subsequent Lancia Stratos.

== Bertone Runabout ==
In 2026, Bertone introduced the Runabout, the first model in their "Bertone Classic" range, which they call a "neo-retro" take on the original A112 Runabout concept. The Runabout is limited to 25 units, offered in both barchetta and targa body styles, and features a rear mid-mounted 3.5 L supercharged V6 engine, sourced from Toyota. This engine is paired with a 6-speed manual transmission and produces 468 bhp (349 kW), which allows it to accelerate from 0-100 km/h (62 mph) in 3.1 seconds, and reach a top speed of almost 170 mph.

== Gallery ==
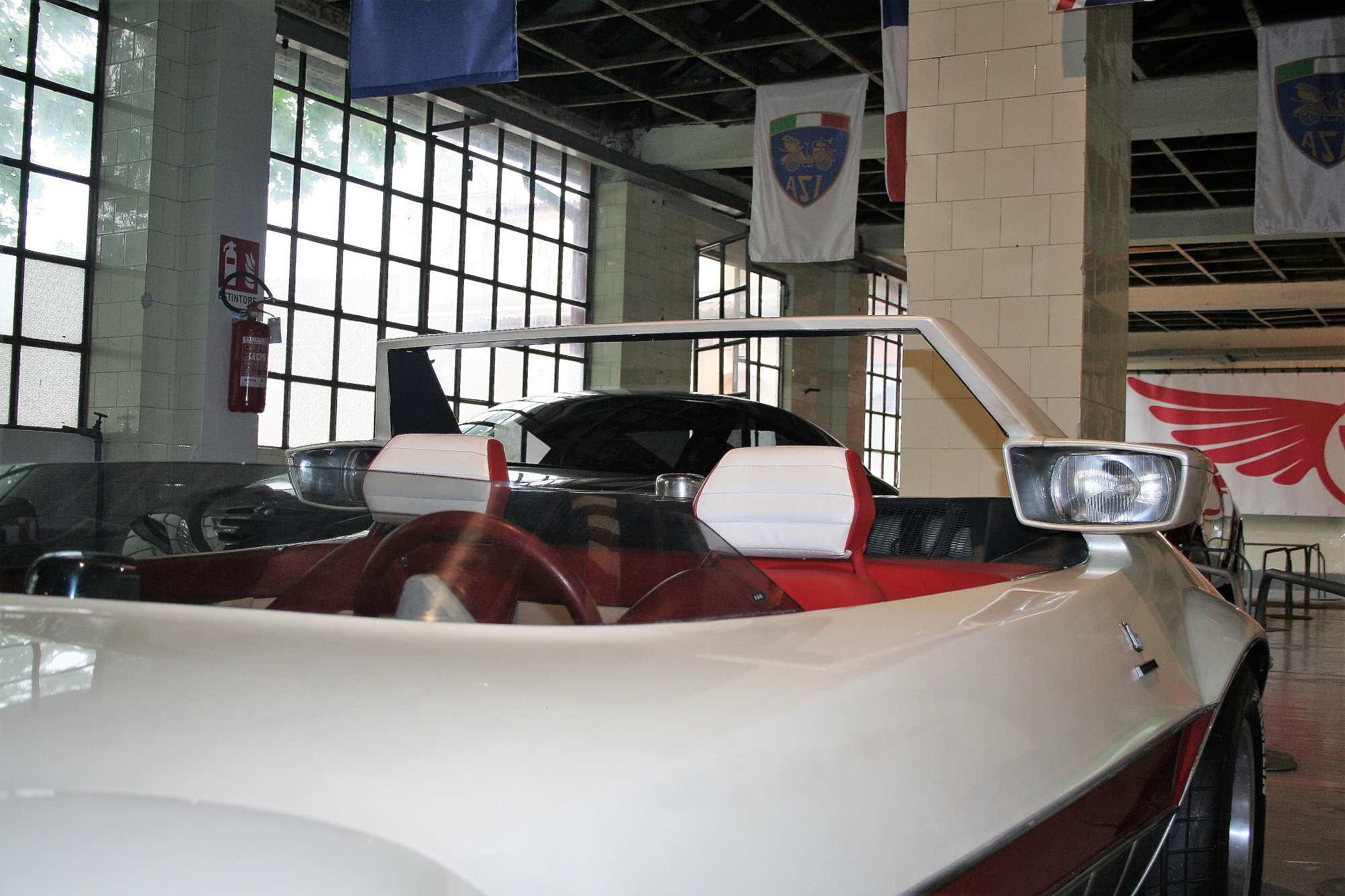
Cabin and rollbar

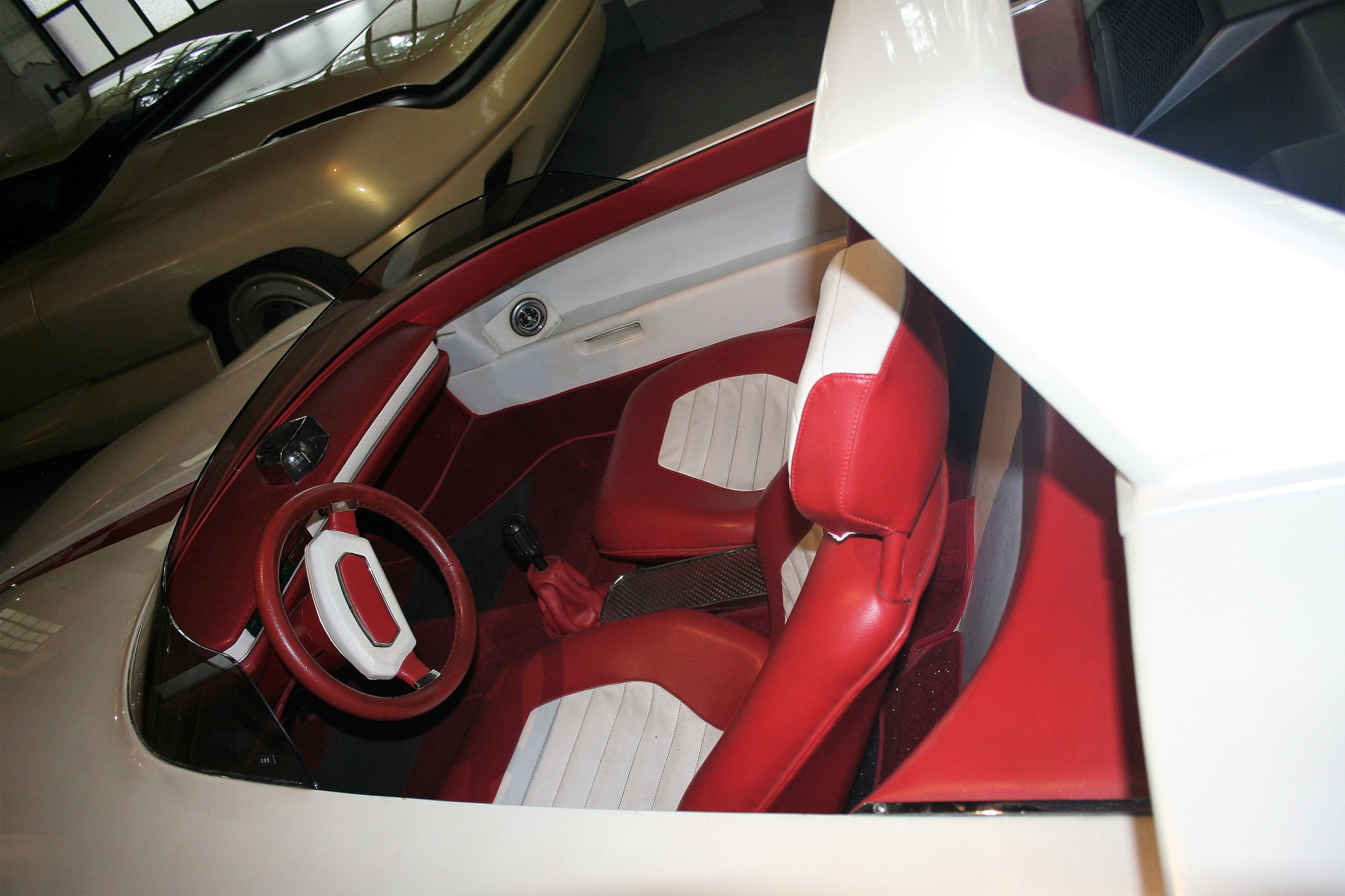
Interior

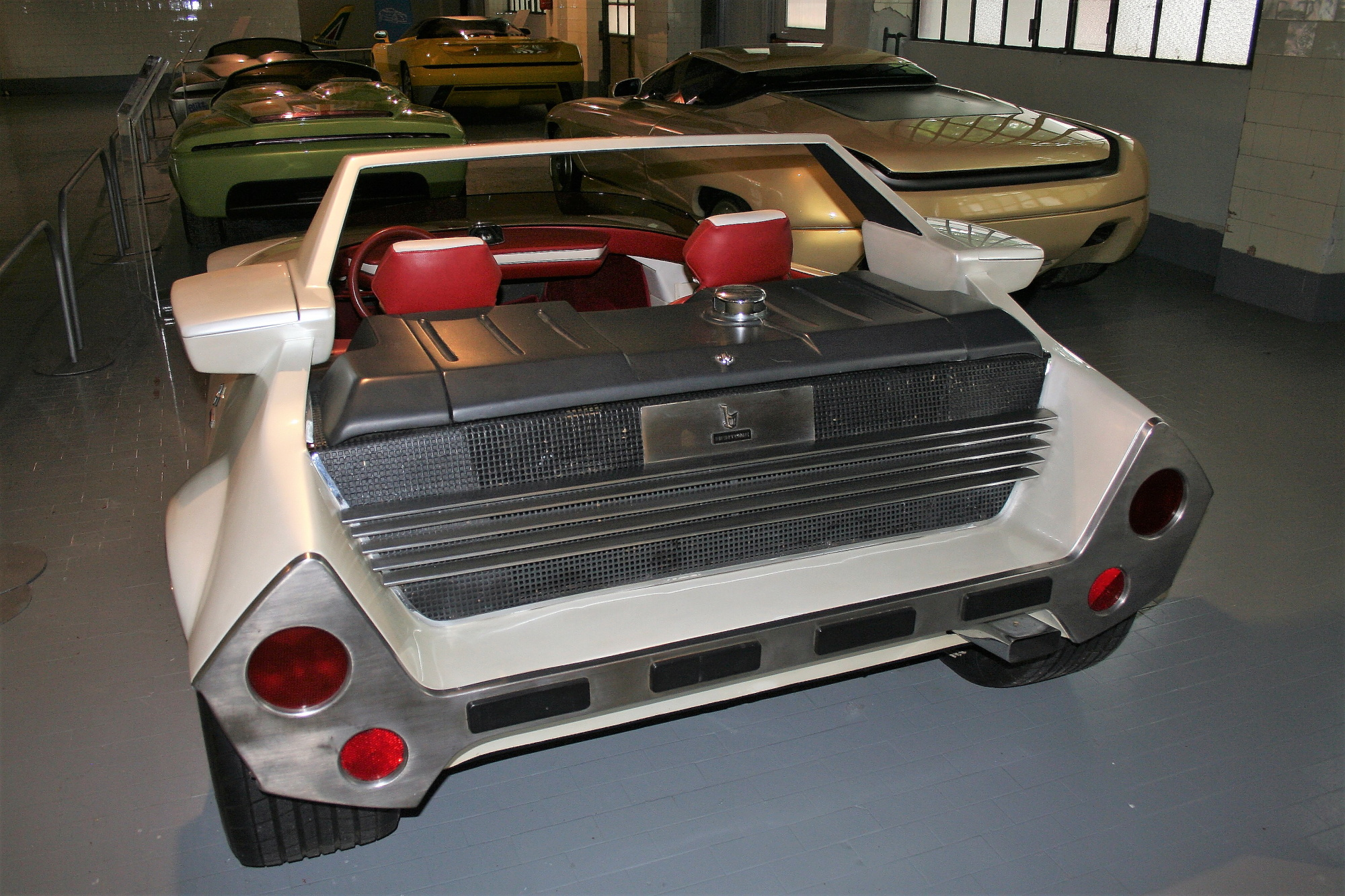
Rear view
