= Lamborghini Bravo =

Concept car designed by Bertone

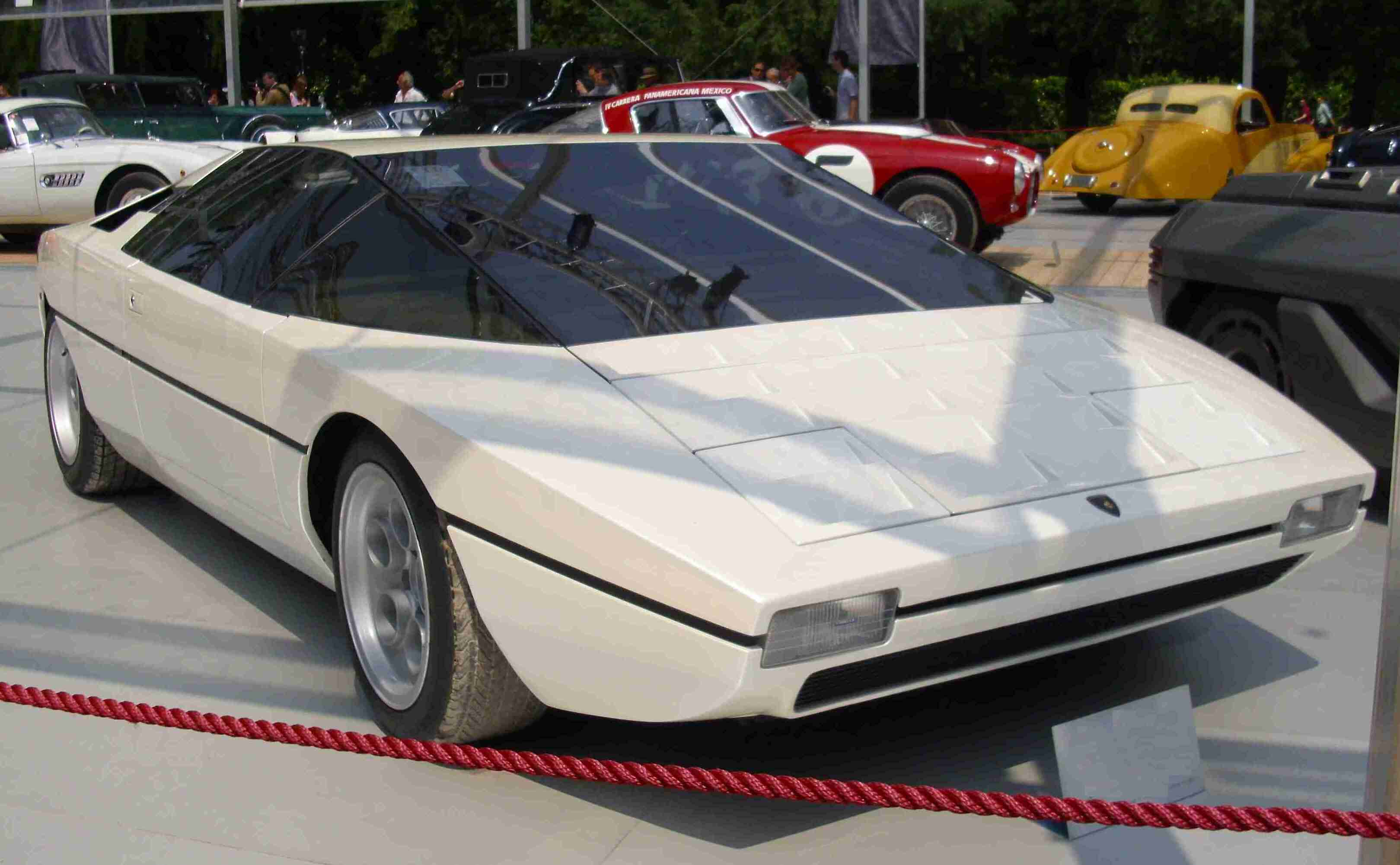

Overview
- Manufacturer: Lamborghini
- Also called: Studio 114
- Production: 1974
- Designer: Marcello Gandini at Bertone

Body and chassis
- Class: Concept car
- Layout: Transverse mid-engine, rear-wheel-drive

Powertrain
- Engine: 3.0 L, 90° Aluminum L240 V8 transverse, mid-mounted DOHC per bank
- Transmission: 5-speed + reverse all-synchromesh

Dimensions
- Wheelbase: 2,275 mm (89.6 in)
- Length: 3,775 mm (148.6 in)
- Width: 1,900 mm (74.8 in)
- Height: 1,050 mm (41.3 in)
- Curb weight: 1,085 kg (2,392 lb)

The Lamborghini Bravo is a concept car designed by Marcello Gandini at Bertone for Lamborghini. It was first presented in 1974 at the Turin Auto Show.

The Bravo was designed to showcase ideas for a replacement for the Urraco. The completely working prototype was built on a Urraco chassis, with the wheelbase shortened by 175mm, and featured a 3.0L 300 hp (224 kW) V8 that powered the rear wheels, undergoing nearly 40,000 miles (64,000 km) of testing before it was placed in the Bertone museum. It was never put into production, but many styling features were inspired by the Countach, including the angular features and the window arrangement.

The Bravo was sold at auction for €588,000 on 21 May 2011. The Bravo has had several different paints, first a pearlescent yellow, then green, followed by champagne, and lastly white. These colour changes have led to incorrect speculation that multiple cars were produced, but official sources confirm only one was made.

== Gallery ==
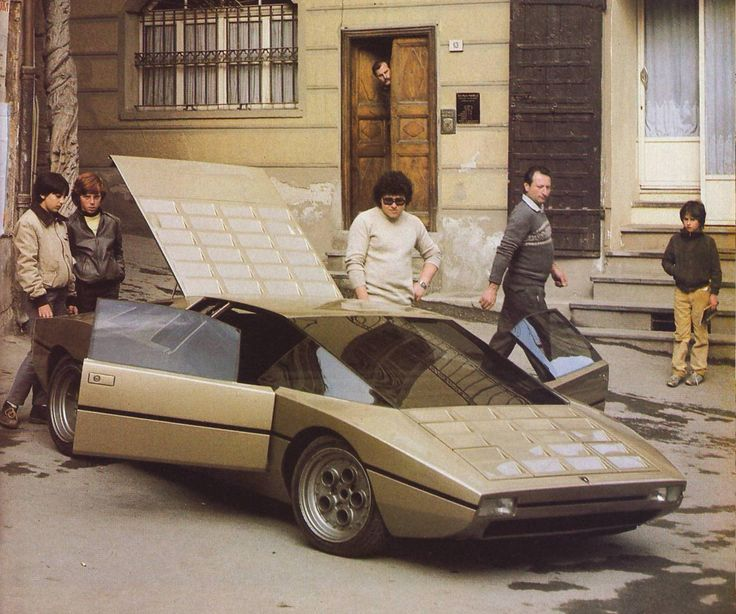
Lamborghini Bravo in Italy in 1974

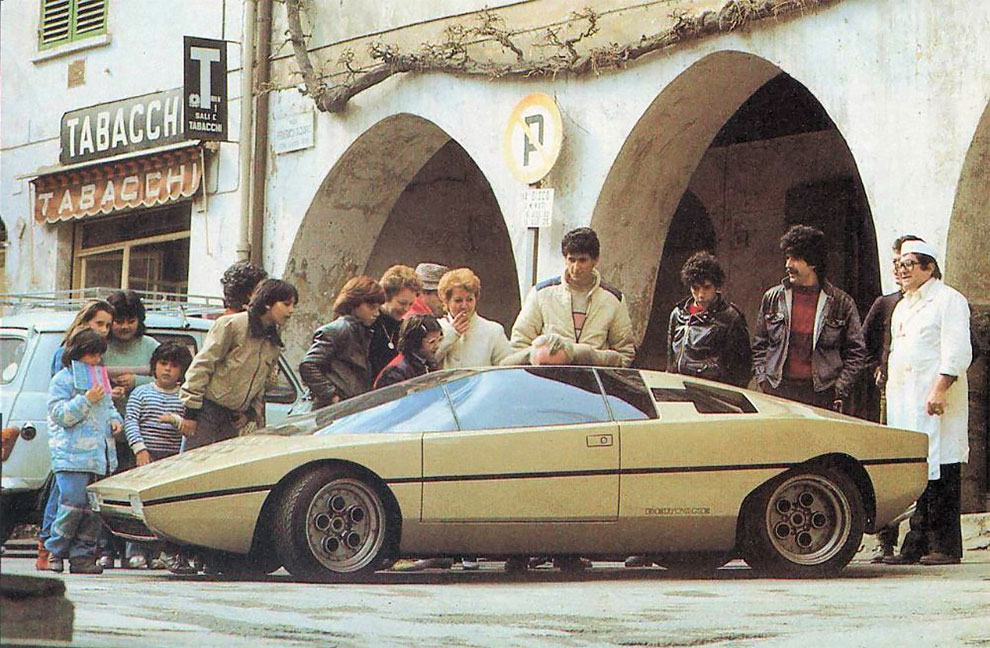
Lamborghini Bravo in Italy in 1974

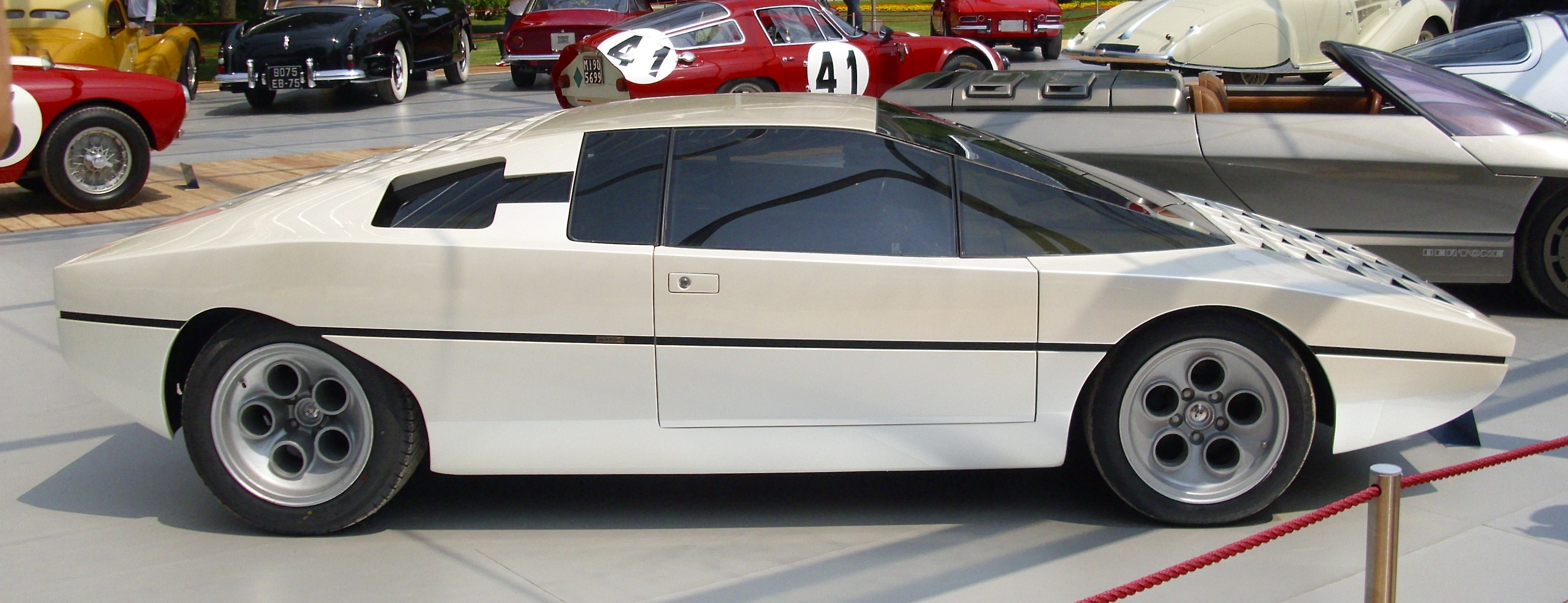
Side view
