= Lamborghini Jarama =

Grand tourer produced by Lamborghini

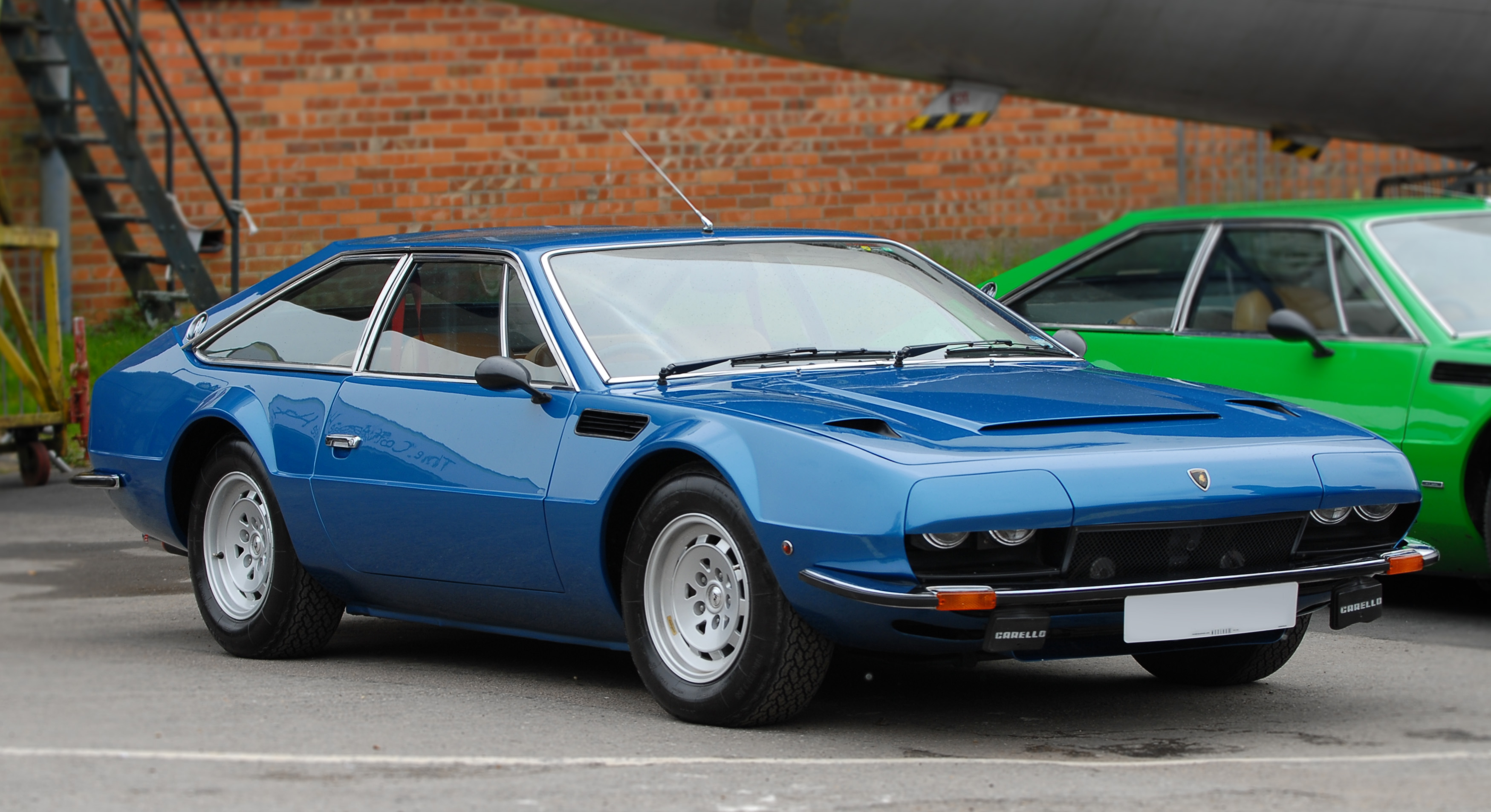
- Jarama S

Overview
- Manufacturer: Lamborghini
- Production: 1970–1976; Jarama: 177 units; Jarama S: 150 units; Total: 327 units
- Assembly: Italy: Sant'Agata Bolognese
- Designer: Marcello Gandini at Bertone

Body and chassis
- Class: Grand tourer
- Body style: 2-door 2+2 coupé
- Layout: FR layout
- Related: Lamborghini Espada

Powertrain
- Engine: 3.9 L (3,929 cc) Lamborghini V12
- Transmission: 5-speed manual; 3-speed TorqueFlite automatic

Dimensions
- Wheelbase: 2,380 mm (93.7 in)
- Length: 4,485 mm (176.6 in)
- Width: 1,820 mm (71.7 in)
- Height: 1,190 mm (46.9 in)
- Kerb weight: 1,450 kg (3,197 lb) (dry)

Chronology
- Predecessor: Lamborghini Islero

The Lamborghini Jarama (Spanish pronunciation: [xaˈɾama]) is a 2+2 grand tourer manufactured and marketed by Italian car manufacturer Lamborghini between 1970 and 1976. It was styled by Bertone designer Marcello Gandini.

Ferruccio Lamborghini intended the name to recall the fighting bulls bred in the Jarama river area in Spain and not the Jarama racing circuit near Madrid.

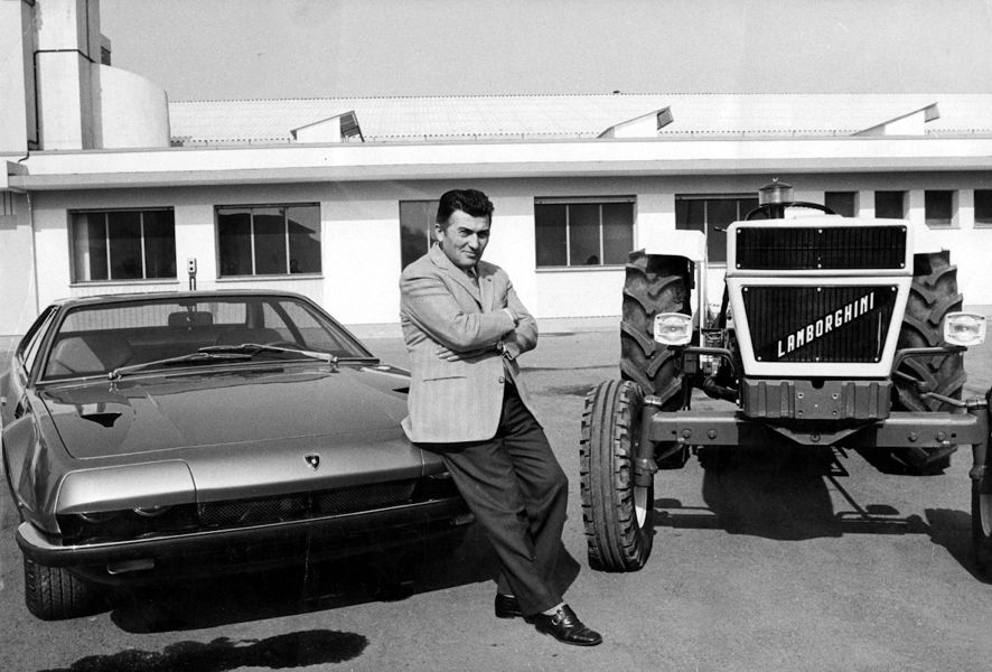
Ferruccio Lamborghini with a Jarama (left) and a Lamborghini built tractor (right)

== History ==
In 1968 Lamborghini began manufacturing the Islero to meet the demand of the American market. When it came time to replace it, instead of just redesigning the Islero, Lamborghini instead made the Jarama. Introduced in 1970 at the Geneva Motor Show, Lamborghini built the Jarama to meet U.S. standards using a version of the Espada chassis that had had its wheelbase shortened by 10.7 inches. Exterior styling was done by Marcello Gandini, which resulted in similarities with the Iso Lele, also styled by Gandini. A total of 328 Jaramas were built.

The Jarama weighs 1,450 kilograms (3,200 lb) dry, heavier than the Islero. It is powered by the same 3.9 L (3,929 cc) Lamborghini V12 engine used in the Islero and Espada, which was heavily derived from the engine used in the earlier 400 GT. The engine was fitted with six Weber 40 DCOE carburetors and sends power to the rear wheels through a five-speed manual transmission. There The original Jarama (1970–1973) model was claimed to produce 350 bhp (260 kW). Early Jaramas feature centre-locking magnesium alloy wheels, as used on the Miura and S1/S2 Espadas.

=== Jarama S ===
The Jarama S (also known as Jarama GTS) was introduced in 1972. The exhaust system, heads and carburetors were revised, resulting in a power increase to 365 bhp (272 kW). The S features a few minor body modifications including a hood scoop, exhaust vents in the fenders, windshield position adjustments and relocated turn signals. New wheels on five-bolt hubs were used, identical to those used on the Series 3 Espada. The interior has a redesigned dashboard trimmed in aluminium, switches relocated to the centre console, added head and sound insulation and improved rear seats and legroom. Power assisted steering became standard early into Jarama S production. Removable roof panels, and a Chrysler TorqueFlite automatic transmission were also available as factory options. Both options were rarely chosen, and it's believed that between 6-20 Jaramas were built with removable roof panels, and only 4 with the 3-speed automatic. In total, Lamborghini built 150 examples of the Jarama S.

Ferruccio Lamborghini's personal Jarama S is on display at the official Lamborghini museum at the company's factory in Sant'Agata Bolognese, Italy. The Jarama was Mr. Lamborghini's favorite model. He stated in a 1991 interview "I preferred the Jarama to all the others, because it is the perfect compromise between the Lamborghini Miura and the Espada."

== Jarama Rally ==
The Jarama Rally, also known as the Jarama "Bob", is a one-off, race modified Jarama built by Lamborghini's test driver Bob Wallace. It features a modified 3.9-liter V12 engine that was repositioned to sit farther back in the engine bay. This allowed it to achieve a nearly 50/50 weight distribution (the standard Jarama had 53/47 weight distribution). The engine produces 380 hp (280 kW) at 8,000 rpm, 15 hp (11 kW) more than stock, and could reportedly reach a top speed of 270 km/h (167.7 mph) and accelerate from 0 to 100 km/h (0 to 62 mph) in about 5 seconds. As a race-ready example, Bob Wallace built the car from a bare shell, re-welding it where needed for stiffness and fitting a lightweight steel rear roll cage. He also upgraded the Jarama with a heavily modified aluminum body, which got rid of, amongst other things, the Jarama's hinged headlights and plastic discs, allowing the car to be around 300 kg (660 lb) lighter than stock at an estimated 1,170 kg (2,580 lb). It also featured center locking Miura wheels and low back seats, Koni racing shock absorbers, and a stripped out interior. The orange and black painted vehicle never ended up participating in any races. The car was reportedly restored in the UK in 1990 after being discovered in Saudi Arabia.

== Gallery ==
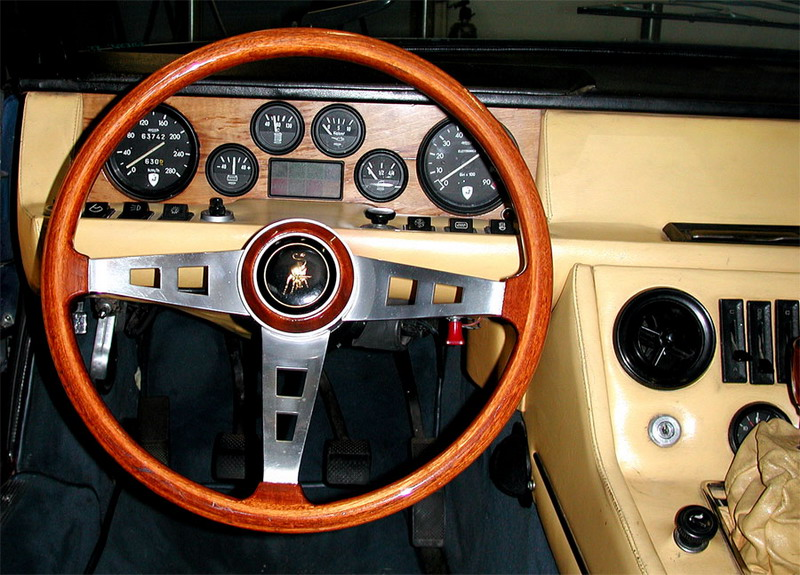
Early Jarama instrument panel and steering wheel

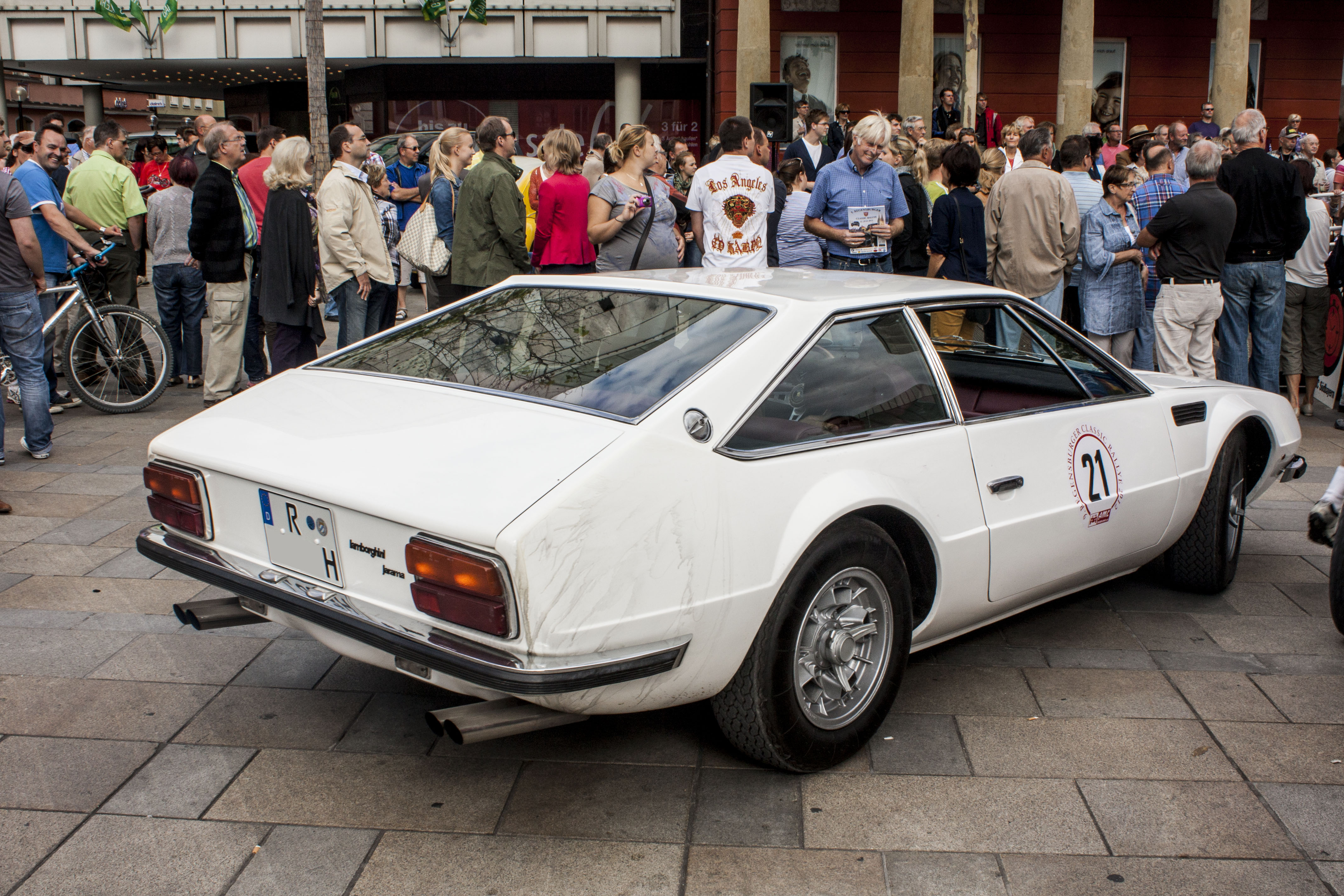
Early Jarama rear view, showing Miura-style knock-off magnesium wheels

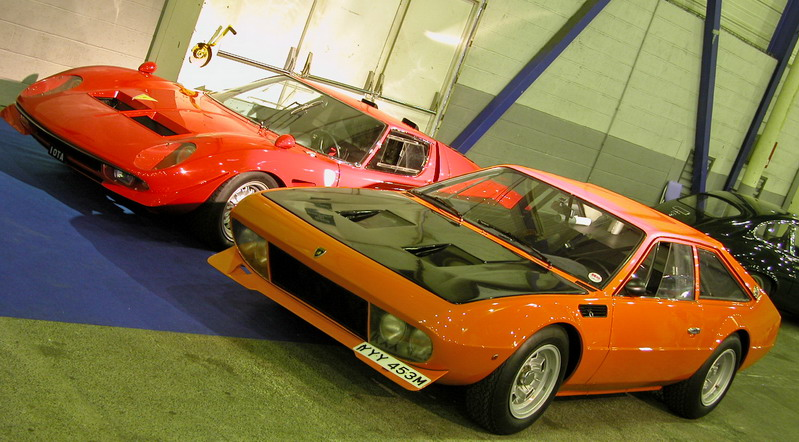
Lamborghini Jarama Rally and Lamborghini Miura P400 Jota

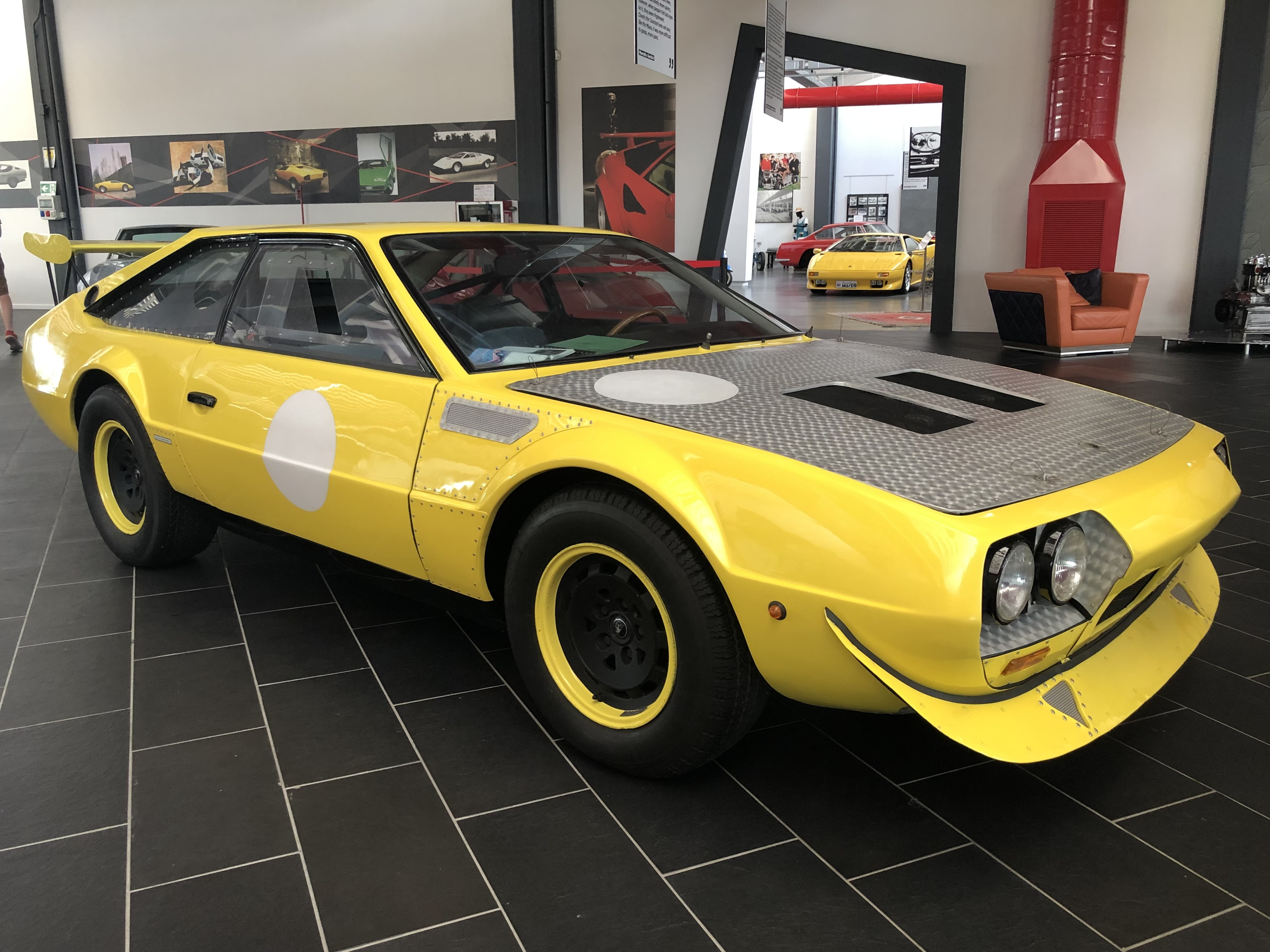
Lamborghini Jarama SVR in the Museo Ferruccio Lamborghini
