= Bob Wallace (test driver) =

New Zealand test driver (1938–2013)

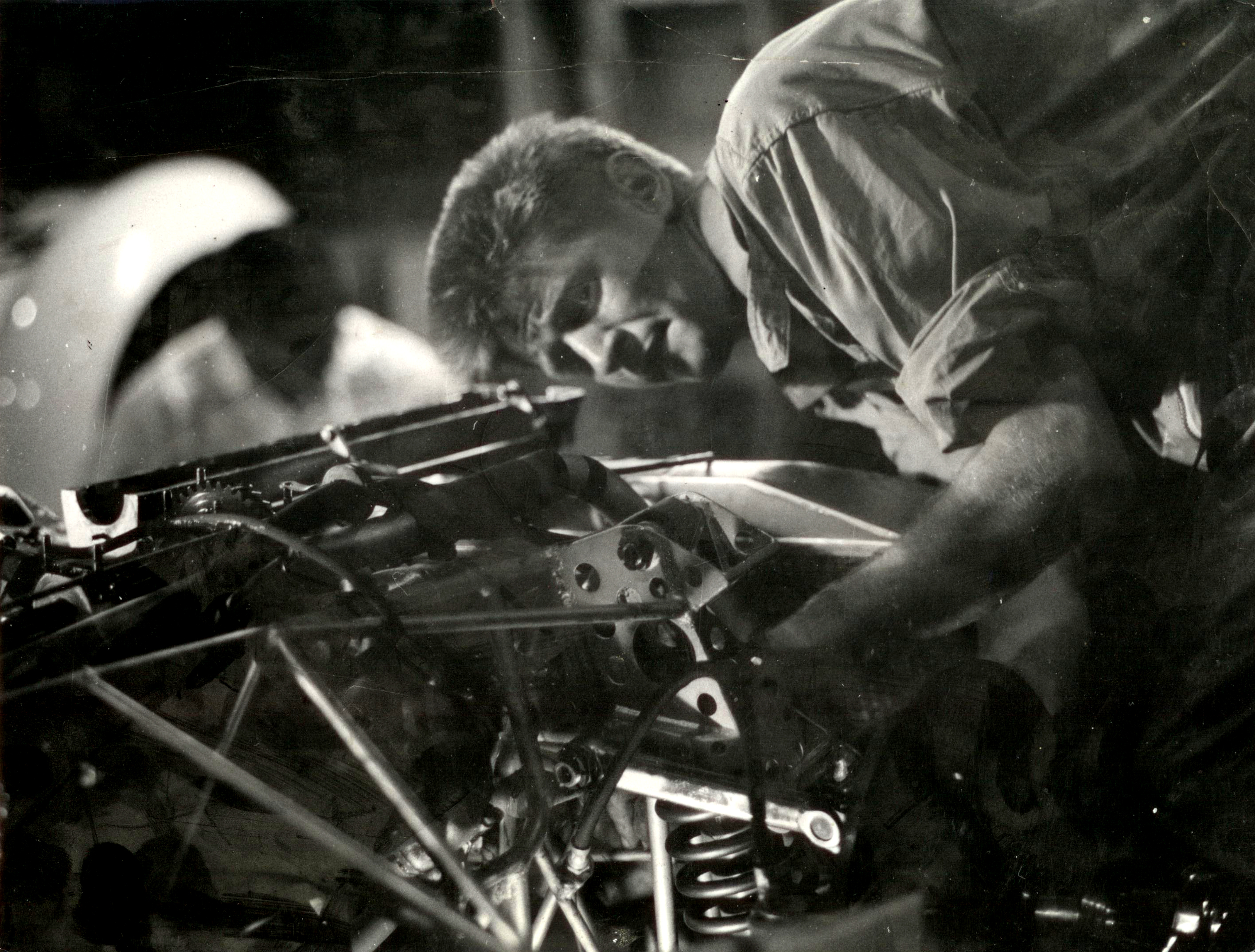
- Bob Wallace working on a Maserati Birdcage in the early 1960s
- Born: 4 October 1938; Auckland, New Zealand
- Died: 19 September 2013 (aged 74)

Bob Wallace (4 October 1938 – 19 September 2013) was a New Zealand test driver, automotive engineer and mechanic, best known for his role in developing early Lamborghini road cars.

== Early life ==
Wallace was born in Auckland, New Zealand in 1938.

He became involved in auto racing as a teenager, meeting local and international drivers and mechanics at races in New Zealand. He moved from Auckland to Italy in 1959, prompted by an invitation from Guerino Bertocchi to work at Maserati. Wallace was accompanied by his friend John Ohlson, neither of whom spoke any Italian. When Wallace arrived in Italy, he was not able to get a job at Maserati. He instead worked as a mechanic for the racing teams Camoradi USA and Scuderia Serenissima. During his time with Camoradi, Wallace worked on the team's Maserati Tipo 61 "Birdcage" and Chevrolet Corvette, including at the 1960 24 Hours of Le Mans. Later on with Scuderia Serenissima, he would work on the Ferrari 250 GTO and Ferrari 250 TR 61 Spyder Fantuzzi and have contact with Scuderia Ferrari.

== Work at Lamborghini ==
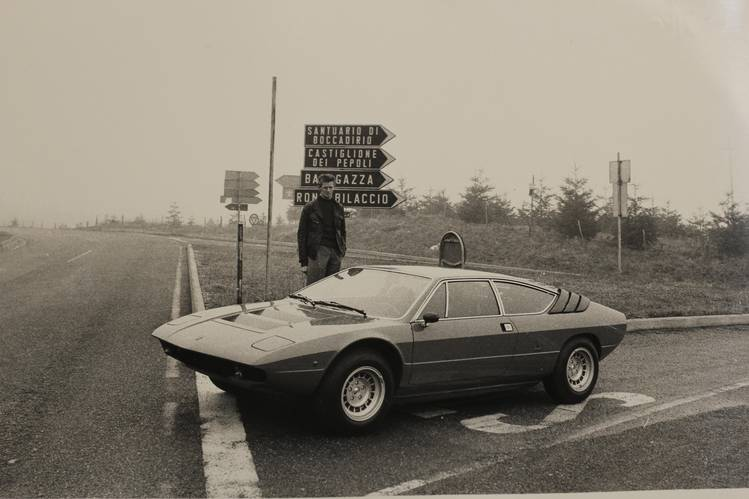
Wallace with a Lamborghini Urraco in 1975

Following the 1963 racing season, Wallace was hired by Lamborghini at the then-new factory in Sant'Agata Bolognese. Initially, his role was to assist in production of the 350 GT as a mechanic and, in his words, "trouble-shooter". He was soon recognised at the factory as talented in vehicle evaluation and subsequently became the chief test driver for Lamborghini, a position which included duties as a road development engineer. The majority of Lamborghini testing was conducted on public roads, including the autostrada and mountain roads, although cars were also run at tracks such as the nearby Varano Circuit. During road tests, Wallace often engaged in informal competition with the Ferrari and Maserati test drivers, either directly or through timed runs such as the 105 miles (169 km) distance between the Milan and Modena autostrada toll booths.

In 1965, Wallace worked with Gianpaolo Dallara and Dallara's then-assistant Paolo Stanzani to develop the Lamborghini Miura. He conducted extensive road testing of Miura prototype and production cars, informing the development of Miura S and SV versions. He also participated in development of the 400 GT, Islero, Urraco, Jarama, Espada, and most extensively, the Countach, including road-testing of the LP500 prototype.

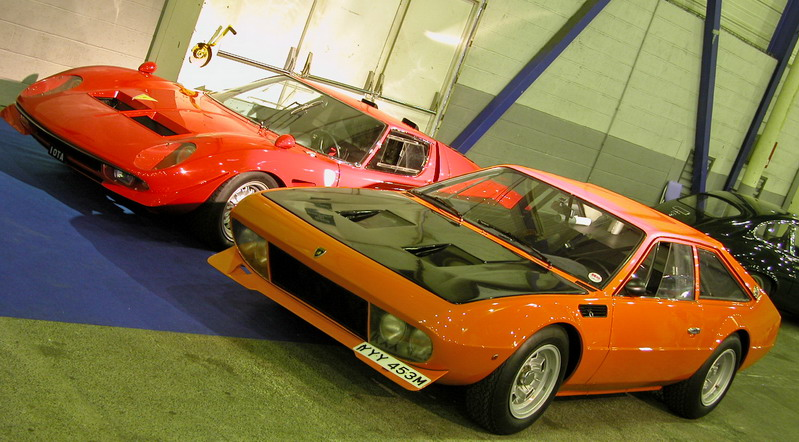
Two Bob Wallace-modified Lamborghinis: the Miura P400 Jota (left, replica of original) and the Jarama "Bob" (right)

Wallace created three lightweight, high-performance versions of Lamborghini road cars during his time at the manufacturer. Despite Ferruccio Lamborghini's reluctance to become involved with racing, Wallace believed Lamborghini production models had great competition potential and built these modified versions on his initiative as proof of concept exercises and test mules. The first and most well-known of these specials was the Miura P400 Jota. After creating the Jota, Wallace modified Jarama #10350 to create the Jarama "Bob," RS, or Rally. He performed many racing-oriented modifications to this car including a stiffened chassis, lighter body panels, modified aerodynamics, upgraded suspension, Miura wheels, and a reworked engine producing an estimated 380 bhp. The final Wallace special was the Urraco "Bob" (also known as the Rally or Rallye), created from the third Urraco pre-production prototype. The car was lightened, stiffened, and provided with aerodynamic enhancements, a roll cage, six-speed transaxle and a special "quattrovalvole" 3.0 litre V8 engine producing 310 bhp. This was the only one of the three factory-built Wallace Lamborghinis to race, in a single outing at Misano Circuit.

Wallace left Lamborghini in 1975, following Ferruccio Lamborghini's sale of the company in 1974. Subsequently, Valentino Balboni took over as chief test driver.

== Later life ==
Following his departure from Lamborghini, Wallace and his wife settled in Phoenix, Arizona, US. There he established an independent mechanic company, Bob Wallace Cars, where he restored and maintained Ferrari and Lamborghini cars. Much of Wallace's work there involved maintenance, restoration and race preparation for vintage Ferraris.

Wallace died on 19 September 2013 at the age of 75.
