= Carrozzeria Marazzi =

Italian coachbuilding company

Carrozzeria Marazzi S.r.l.
- Type: S.r.l. (limited company)
- Industry: Automotive
- Founded: Caronno Pertusella, Italy (1967)
- Defunct: 2019
- Headquarters: Milan, Italy
- Key people: Carlo Marazzi (founder); Serafino Marazzi (president); Mario Marazzi
- Services: Construction, processing, engineering, design of automobiles

Carrozzeria Marazzi was an Italian coachbuilding company founded in 1967 and is located in Caronno Pertusella, in the province of Varese, Lombardy.

== Company history ==
The company was established by Carlo Marazzi (with sons Serafino and Mario) and employees from the then bankrupt Carrozzeria Touring of Milan. Marazzi first completed the Lamborghini 400GT 2+2 series, which was followed by a series of 125 Lamborghini Islero (1967), and the first few of the Lamborghini Jarama (1970). Next came the eighteen Alfa Romeo 33 Stradale (1967), a few Alfa Romeo Giulia Nuova Promiscua (1973), two Alfa Romeo 90 station wagon prototypes (designed for the Auto Capital magazine in 1985) and a Fiat Punto Cabrio Wagon Bricò prototype (1994). Marazzi also made various hearses, based on Mercedes-Benz through the 1990s. Marazzi's final works included cars such as the Alfa Romeo 8C Competizione Spider prototype and a Land Rover Discovery 3, armored for police use.

The company was liquidated in 2019.

== See also ==
- Carrozzeria Touring
