= Lamborghini Islero =

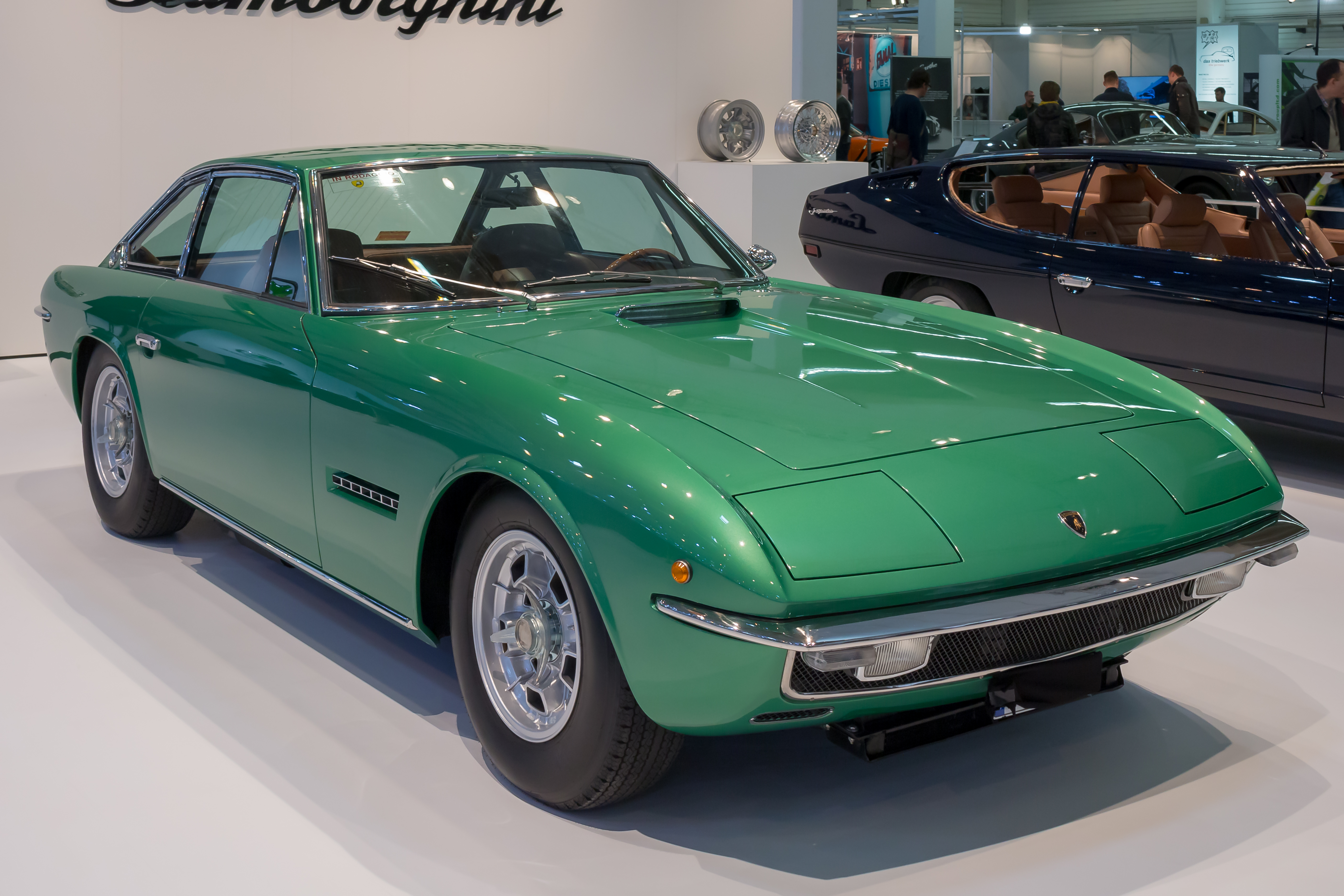
- Lamborghini Islero S

Overview
- Manufacturer: Lamborghini
- Production: 1968–1969; 225 built
- Assembly: Italy: Sant'Agata Bolognese
- Designer: Mario Marazzi at Carrozzeria Marazzi

Body and chassis
- Class: Grand tourer
- Body style: 2-door 2+2 coupé
- Layout: FR layout
- Platform: tubular steel frame riveted aluminium body panels

Powertrain
- Engine: 3.9 L (3,929 cc) Lamborghini V12
- Transmission: 5-speed manual with all-synchromesh

Dimensions
- Wheelbase: 2,550 mm (100.4 in)
- Length: 4,525 mm (178.1 in)
- Width: 1,730 mm (68.1 in)
- Height: 1,300 mm (51.2 in)
- Curb weight: 1,315 kg (2,899 lb)

Chronology
- Predecessor: Lamborghini 400 GT
- Successor: Lamborghini Jarama

The Lamborghini Islero (Italian pronunciation: [iˈzlɛːro], Spanish: [isˈleɾo]) is a grand tourer produced by Italian automaker Lamborghini between 1968 and 1969. It was the replacement for the 400 GT and featured the Lamborghini V12 engine. The car debuted at the 1968 Geneva Auto Show.

== History ==
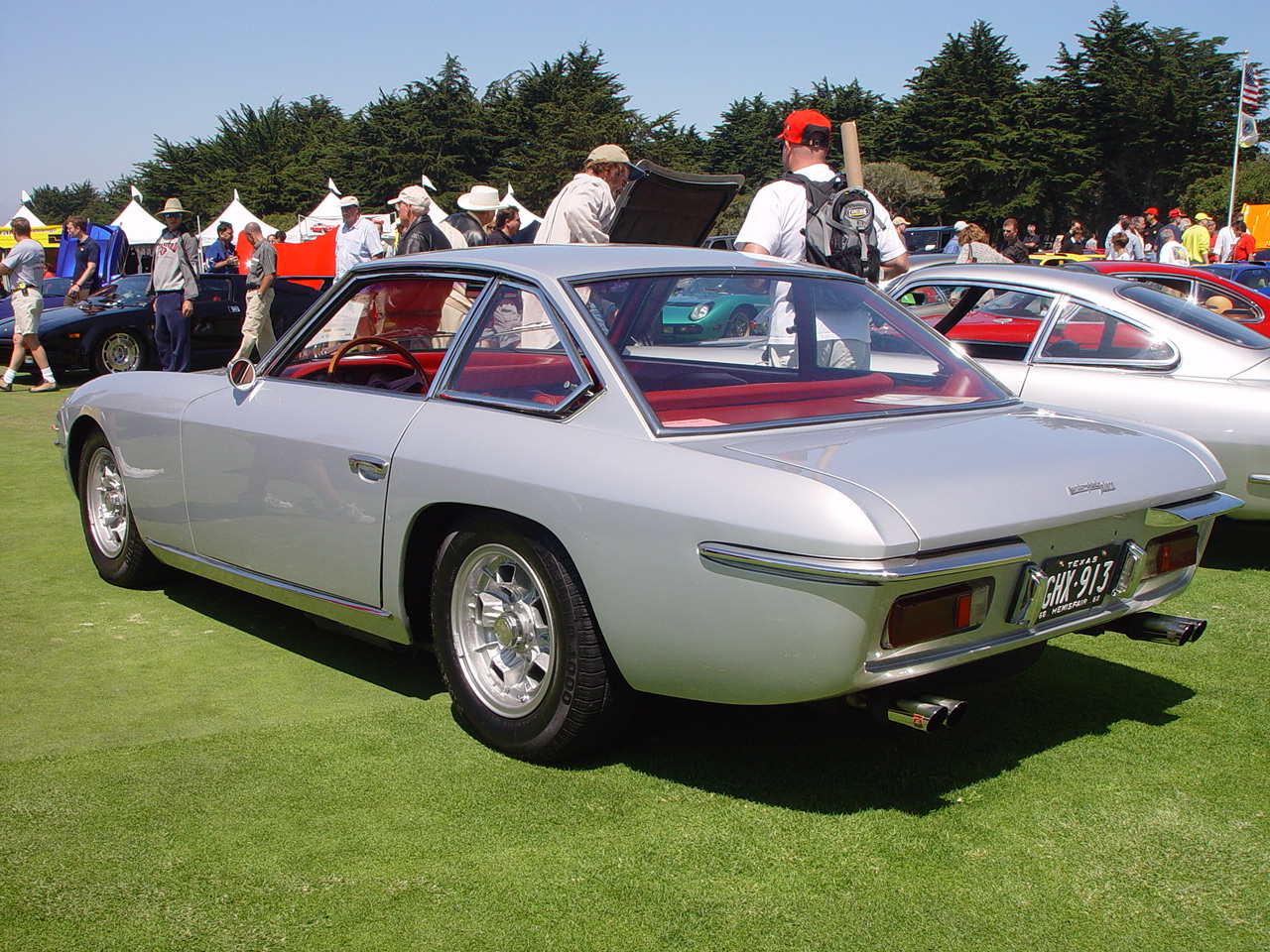
Lamborghini Islero rear view. The non-flared fenders and lack of front fender vents identify this as an early, non-S model.

The Islero was introduced at the 1968 Geneva Auto Show alongside the Lamborghini Espada. While both automobiles featured a 2+2 coupé body style, the Islero was intended to be a more visually conservative alternative to the then-radical Espada, in keeping with the traditional style of the earlier 400 GT. The car's namesake, Islero, was a Miura bull that killed matador Manuel Rodriguez "Manolete" on August 28, 1947. Lamborghini also produced a car named the Miura, from 1966 to 1973, while the Murcielago was named after another famous individual Miura bull.

Carrozzeria Marazzi was chosen to construct the Islero's body. This firm was chosen as it was founded by Carlo Marazzi, a former employee of the now-bankrupt Carrozzeria Touring. Touring had previously produced bodies for the 350 GT and 400 GT. The firm was staffed by former Touring employees, along with Marazzi's sons Mario and Serafino. Ferruccio Lamborghini was rumored to be the true designer of the body, dictating his requirements to Marazzi. The design was essentially a rebody of the 400 GT, with its good outward visibility, roomier interior, and additional soundproofing improving driver and passenger comfort compared to previous models. The Islero's body and interior suffered from numerous deficiencies in fit and finish, some of which was corrected in the later Islero S. Lamborghini test driver Bob Wallace stated in an interview that the Islero's quality issues were due to Carrozzeria Marazzi's lack of resources and that Marazzi-built cars were never built to the same quality as those built at Touring. 125 Isleros were built.

An updated Islero, dubbed the Islero S or Islero GTS, was released in 1969. There were quite a few styling changes, including six engine cooling vents on both front fenders (hinting at the twelve cylinders within), an enlarged hood scoop (which supplied air to the interior of the car, not the engine), slightly flared fenders, tinted windows, round side-marker lights (instead of teardrops on the original), and a fixed section in the door windows. Various other changes included slightly increased power output, larger brake discs, revised rear suspension and revamped dashboard and interior. 100 examples of the Islero S were built, bringing the production total of the Islero nameplate to 225 cars. Ferruccio Lamborghini himself drove an Islero during that era – as did his brother Edmondo. The car is also famous for its appearance in the Roger Moore thriller The Man Who Haunted Himself and in the Italian short film anthology Vedo nudo (as the car of Sylva Koscina).

=== Racing ===
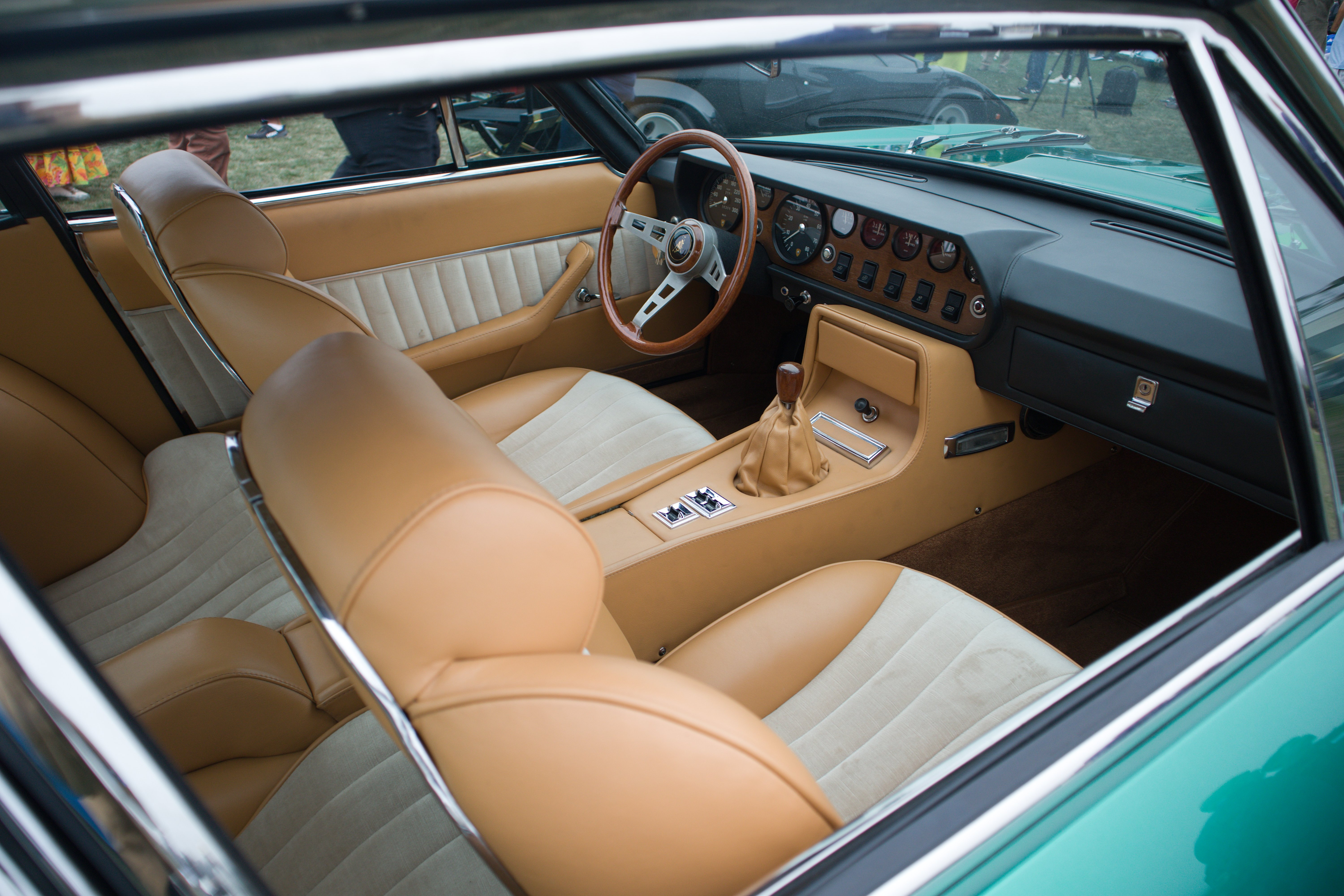
Lamborghini Islero S interior

While the Islero was not intended to be a racing model, French enthusiasts Paul Rilly and Roger Levève attempted to enter a lightly modified Islero (chassis 6348) in the 1975 24 Hours of Le Mans to compete in the GTX class. The car was equipped with upgraded brakes and suspension, modified air intake and exhaust system, a roll cage, a 100 litres (26 US gal) fuel tank, five-point harness, lighting for the racing number and hood straps. The Islero suffered a crash during qualifying and was not competitive with a best lap time of 5:28.00. Although at the last minute race officials permitted the Islero team to enter the main race due to withdrawal of another entrant, the team had already left the racetrack after the crash and did not compete.

== Specifications ==
The Islero had a 325 bhp (242 kW; 330 PS), 3.9 L (3929 cc) Lamborghini V12 engine, as was also used in the 400 GT, Miura, Espada and Jarama. Six Weber 40 DCOE carburetors provided air and fuel. The Lamborghini-designed five-speed manual transmission was equipped with synchromesh and a hydraulically operated dry clutch. The fully independent double wishbone suspension and disc brakes were based on the 400 GT design, with thicker anti-roll bars, a wider front track and revised front suspension. These suspension changes were primarily made to accommodate newly available tires that were wider and grippier than those originally used on the 400 GT. The wheels were cast magnesium made by Campagnolo, as on the Espada and Miura. From the factory, the Islero was fitted with Pirelli Cinturato 205VR15 tyres (CN72).

The Islero's top speed was rated at 154 mph (248 km/h) and acceleration from 0 to 60 mph (97 km/h) took 6.4 seconds.

=== Islero S ===
The engine in this model was tuned to 350 bhp (261 kW; 355 PS), but the torque remained the same. This was achieved by using Miura P400S-type camshafts and raising the compression ratio from 9.5:1 in the original Islero to 10.8:1 in the Islero S. Rear suspension was also revised to be closer to the Espada's design, in an attempt to improve stability under acceleration and braking. The top speed of the S improved to 161 mph (259 km/h) and acceleration from 0 to 60 mph (97 km/h) in 6.2 seconds.
