= Lamborghini Espada =

Grand touring coupé produced by Lamborghini

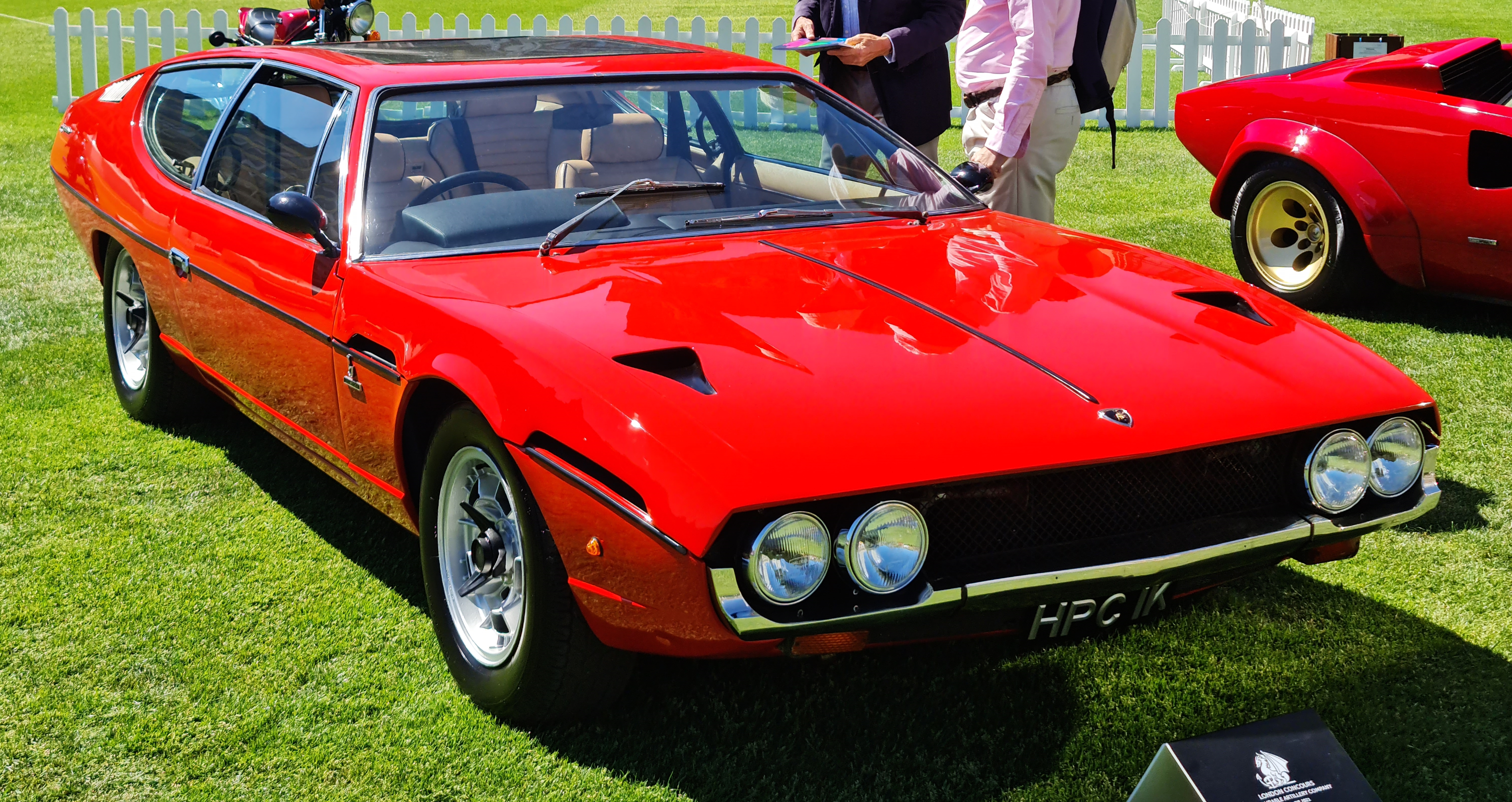
- A Series II Espada

Overview
- Manufacturer: Lamborghini
- Production: 1968–1978; 1,227 made
- Assembly: Italy: Sant'Agata Bolognese
- Designer: Marcello Gandini at Bertone

Body and chassis
- Class: Grand tourer
- Body style: 2-door coupé
- Layout: Front-engine, rear-wheel-drive

Powertrain
- Engine: 3.9 L (3,929 cc) Lamborghini V12
- Transmission: 5-speed manual; 3-speed TorqueFlite automatic

Dimensions
- Wheelbase: 2,650 mm (104.3 in)
- Length: 4,730 mm (186.2 in)
- Width: 1,860 mm (73.2 in)
- Height: 1,185 mm (46.7 in)
- Kerb weight: 1,630 kg (3,594 lb)

Chronology
- Predecessor: Lamborghini 400 GT 2+2

The Lamborghini Espada is a 4-seat grand touring coupé built by Italian car manufacturer Lamborghini between 1968 and 1978.

== History ==
The car was designed by Marcello Gandini at Bertone. Gandini drew inspiration and cues from two of his Bertone show cars from 1967, the Lamborghini Marzal and the Bertone Pirana.

The Espada is a four-seater GT and was initially sold alongside the Islero and the rear mid-engine Miura. The Espada and the Islero both replaced the 400 GT 2+2 and had similar mechanical underpinnings, with the Espada a more visually daring alternative to the relatively conservative and discrete Islero.

The Spanish name "Espada" (pronounced [esˈpaða]) means "sword", referring to the sword that the torero uses to kill the bull.

During its ten years in production the car underwent some changes, and three different series were produced. These were the S1 (1968–1970), the S2 (1970–1972) and the S3 (1972–1978). Each model featured interior redesigns, minor mechanical improvements and minor exterior changes. 1,217 Espadas were made, making it the most numerous and longest-running Lamborghini model until the expansion of Countach production in the mid-1980s.

=== Series I ===
The Espada was launched at the 1968 Geneva Motor Show, alongside the Islero. The Espada was equipped with a 3,929 cc (240 cu in) Lamborghini V12 engine derived from that used in the 400 GT 2+2, rated at 325 PS (239 kW; 321 hp) in the series I cars. The design of the series I dashboard was inspired by the Marzal concept car, and featured octagonal housings for the main instruments, topped by an additional binnacle for the secondary gauges. The alloy wheels were made by Campagnolo on knock-off hubs, of the same design seen on the Miura. The tail lights were the same units mounted on the first series Fiat 124 Sport Coupé. 186 were made before January 1970.

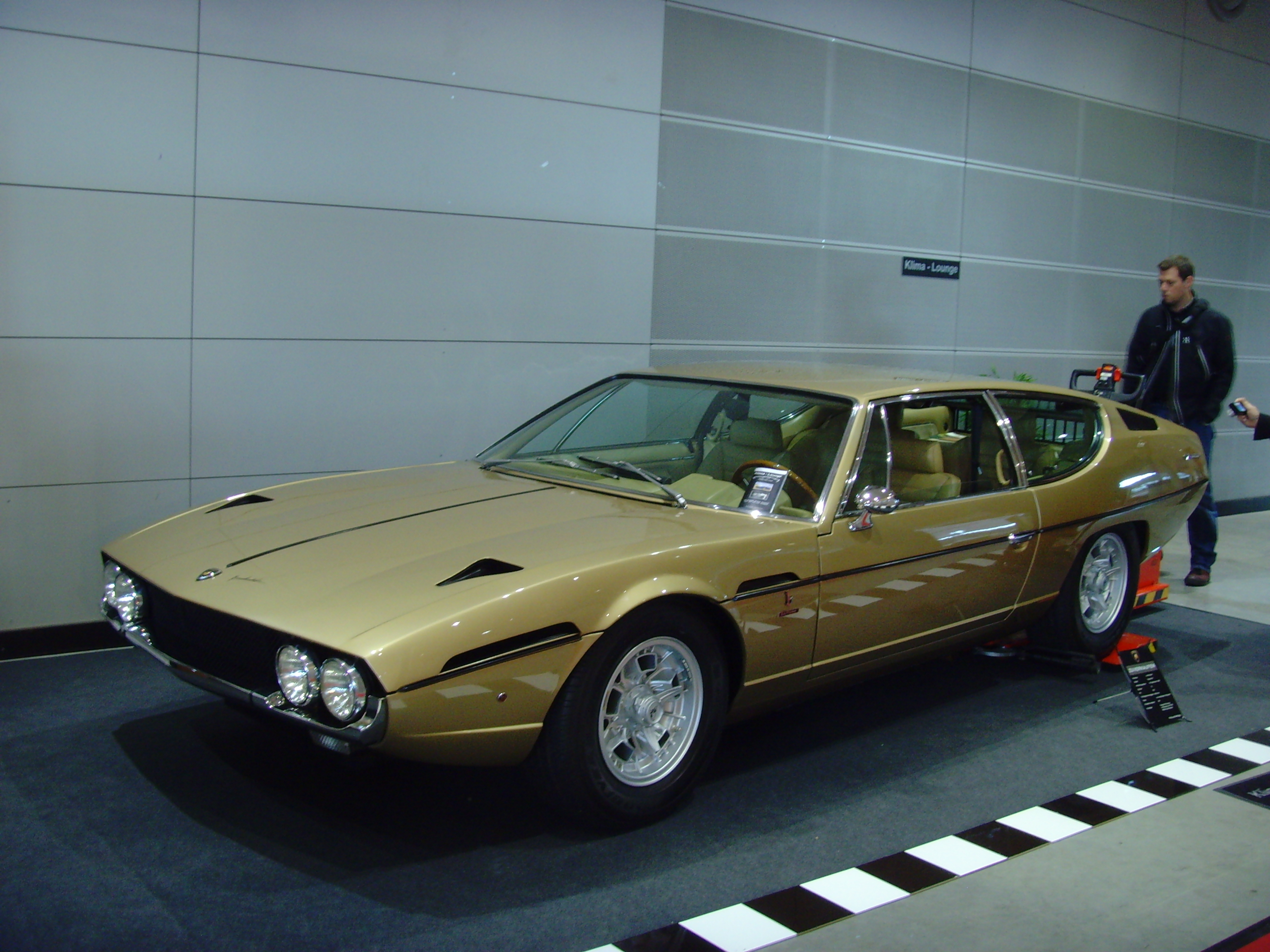
S1 front view

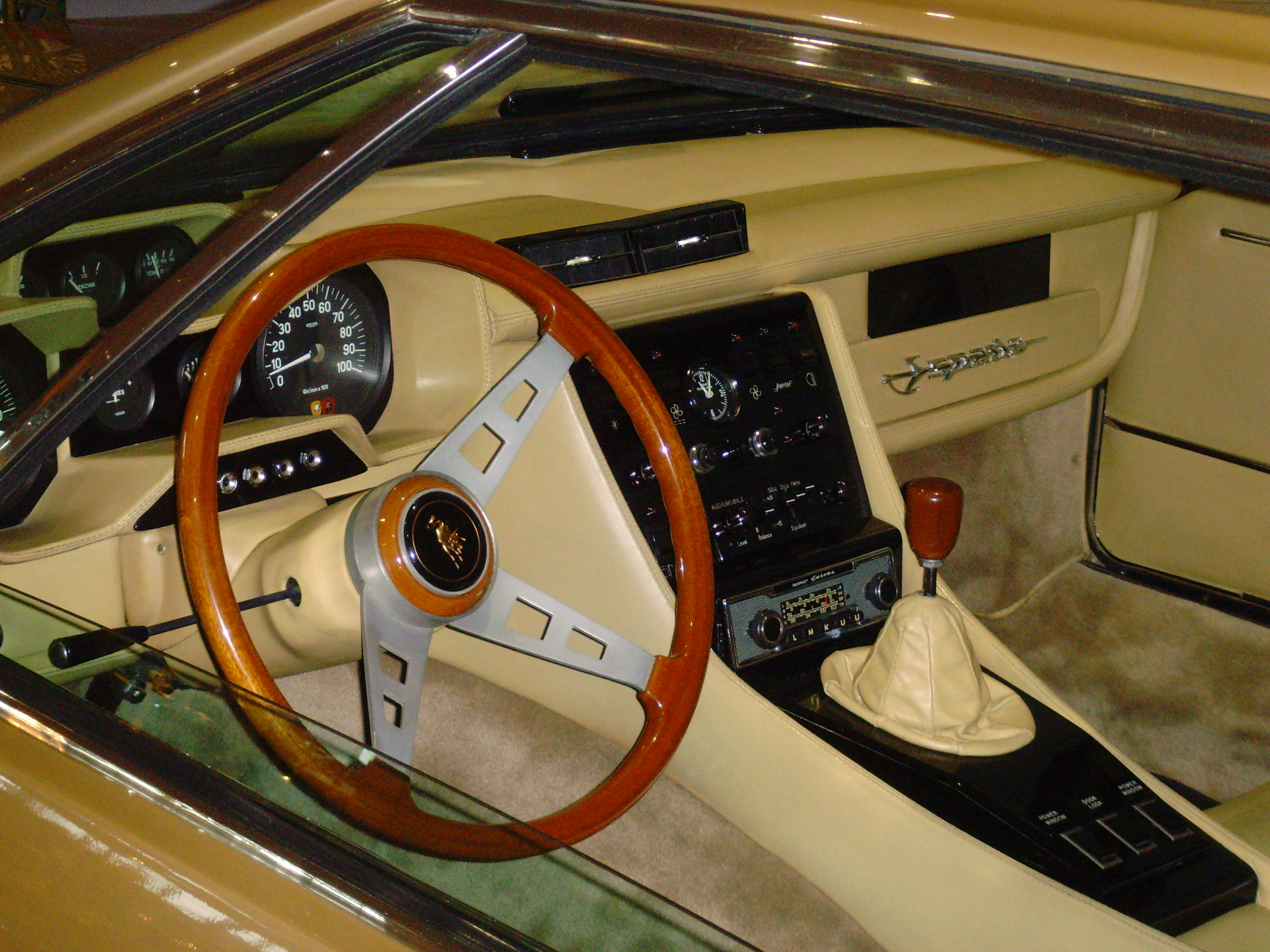
S1 interior

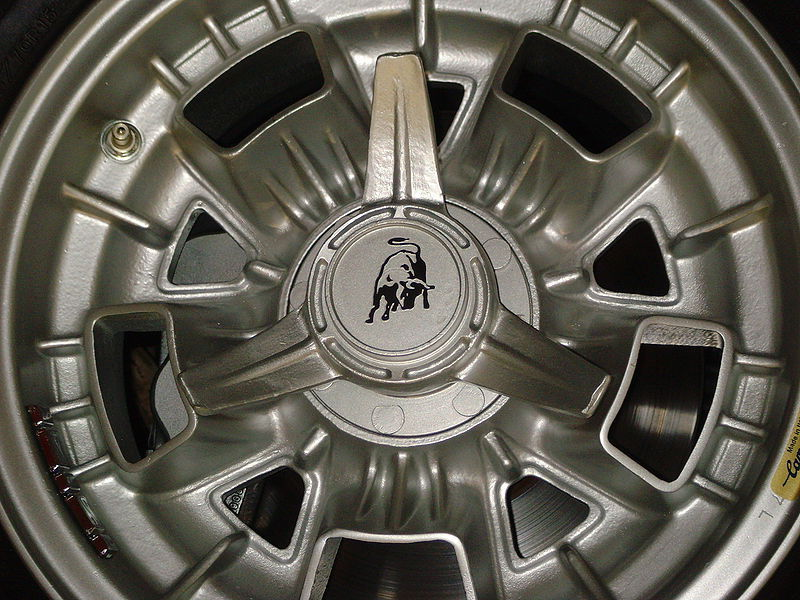
Campagnolo magnesium alloy wheels used on S1 and S2 Espadas

=== Series II ===
At the 1970 Brussels Motor Show Lamborghini unveiled the Espada S2. Outside the only change was the deletion of the grille covering the vertical glass tail panel. Inside changes were more radical: all-new dashboard, centre console and steering wheel were installed. The instrument binnacle was of a more conventional rectangular shape, with round gauges. A wood-trimmed fascia extended along the entire width of the dashboard. The center armrest was also revised and ventilation for rear seat passengers was improved. Power output increased to 350 PS (257 kW; 345 hp) due to a higher 10.7:1 compression ratio. The brakes were upgraded to vented Girling discs instead of solid discs. CV joints were now used on the rear half-shafts. 575 Series II Espadas were made, making it the mass-produced variant.

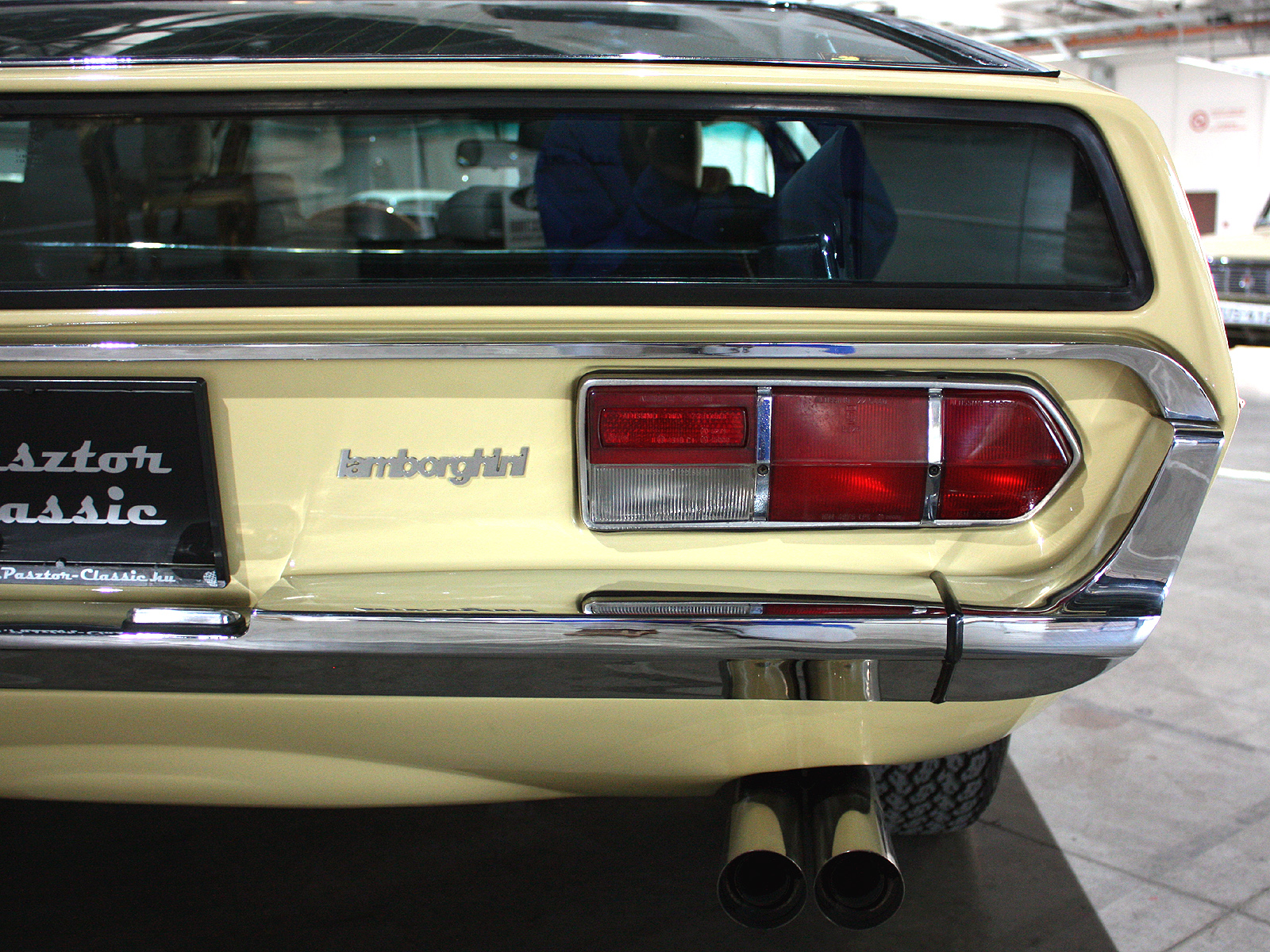
Rear view of an Espada S2, showing the characteristic glass panel, early tail lights and the twin exhausts

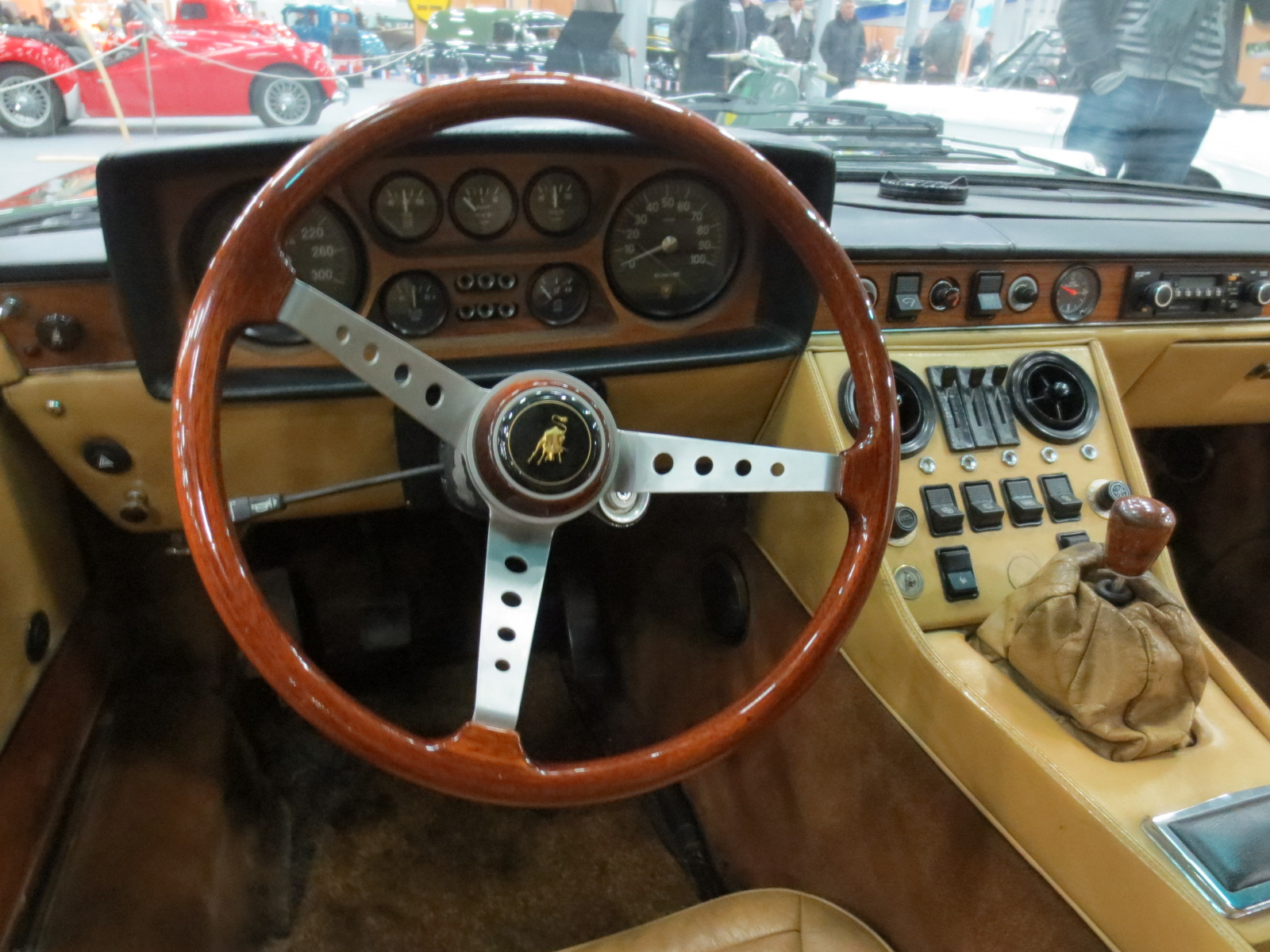
S2 interior, with redesigned instrument panel

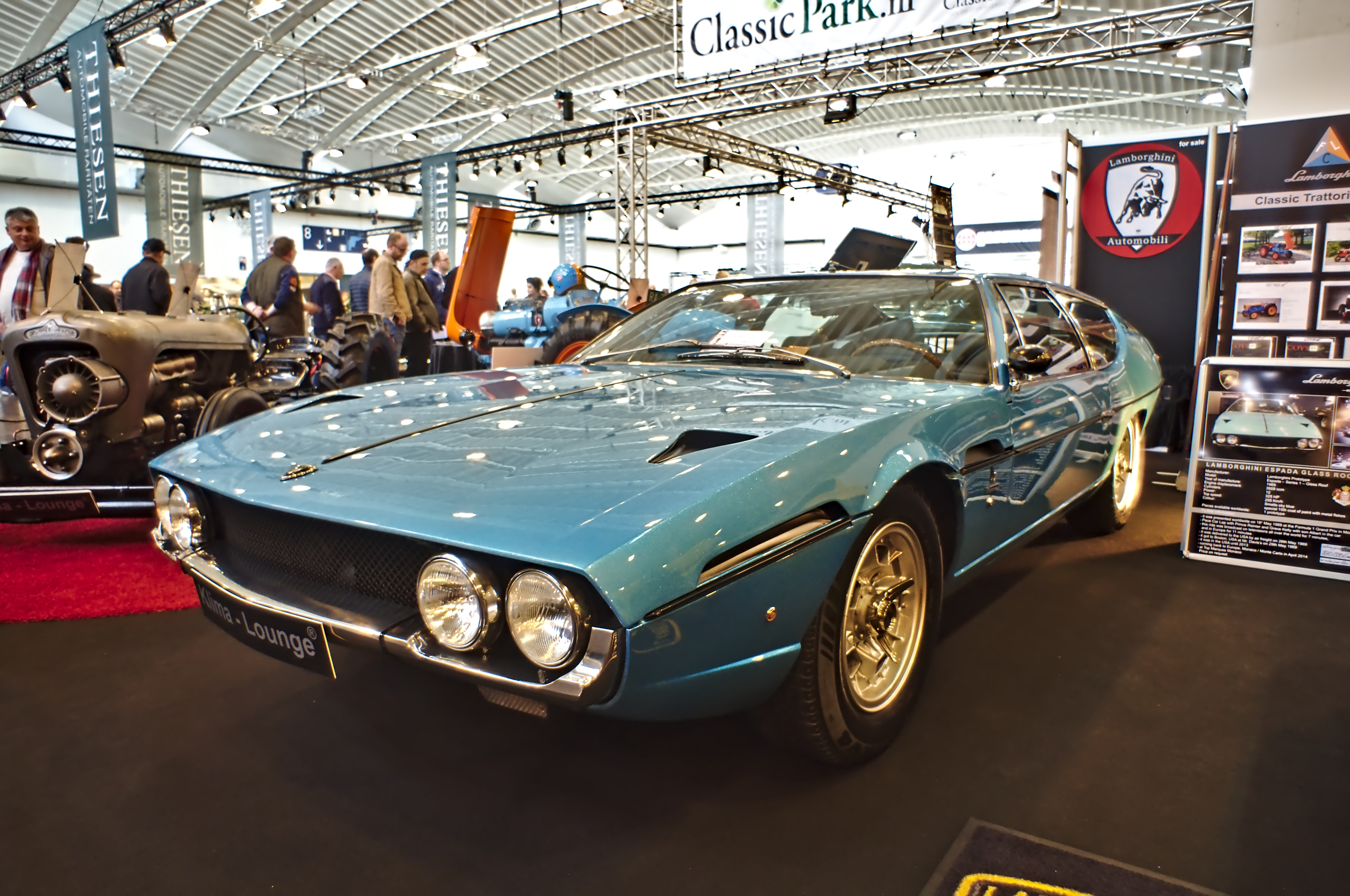
Front view of S2, showing S1/S2 grille mesh style

=== Series III ===
The Espada S3 was launched in 1972. With this revision, the interior now incorporated a redesigned aluminum-trimmed instrument panel that kept all instruments and most controls (including the radio) within easy reach of the driver. Several exterior changes were also made. Newly designed wheels on five-stud hubs replaced the earlier knock-off wheels. These wheels were also used on some late S2 Espadas, now fitted with wider, 215/70 tyres. The front grille now had a square instead of hexagonal mesh. New tail lights were used, sourced from the Alfa Romeo 1750 Berlina. A sunroof was now available as an option.

The 350 PS (257 kW; 345 hp) engine was carried over from the S2. Power steering by ZF and air conditioning were now standard. Spring and shock absorber tuning was altered slightly. In 1974, a Chrysler Torqueflite 3 speed automatic transmission became available as an option.

From 1975, large impact bumpers had to be installed to meet United States safety requirements. US emissions requirements also led to the factory adding a secondary air injection pump and special tuning of carburetors and the ignition system. Some people consider these later US-spec cars as a separate fourth series, but Lamborghini did not officially change the model designation.

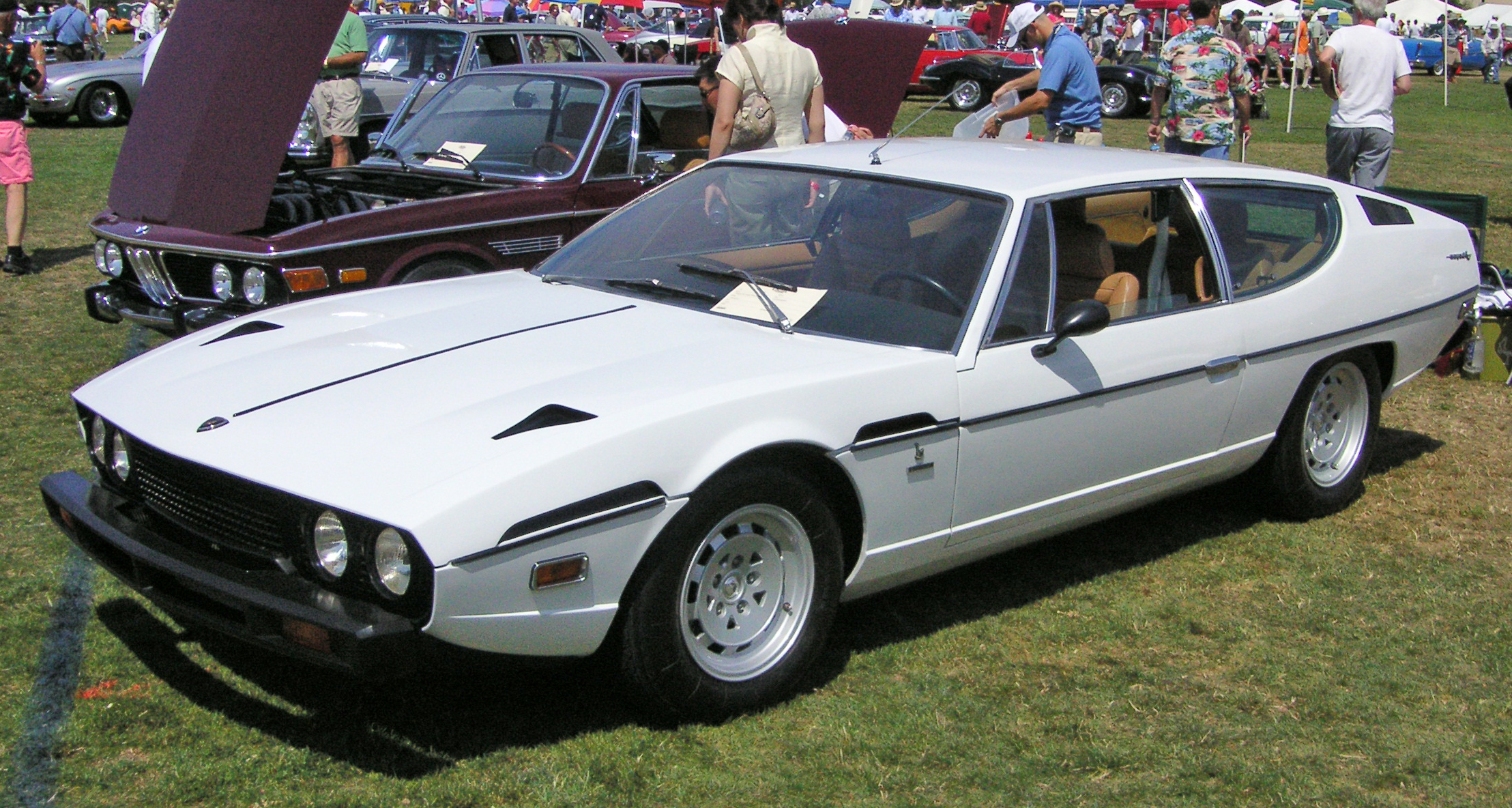
Espada S3, with U.S. specification bumpers and 5-bolt wheels

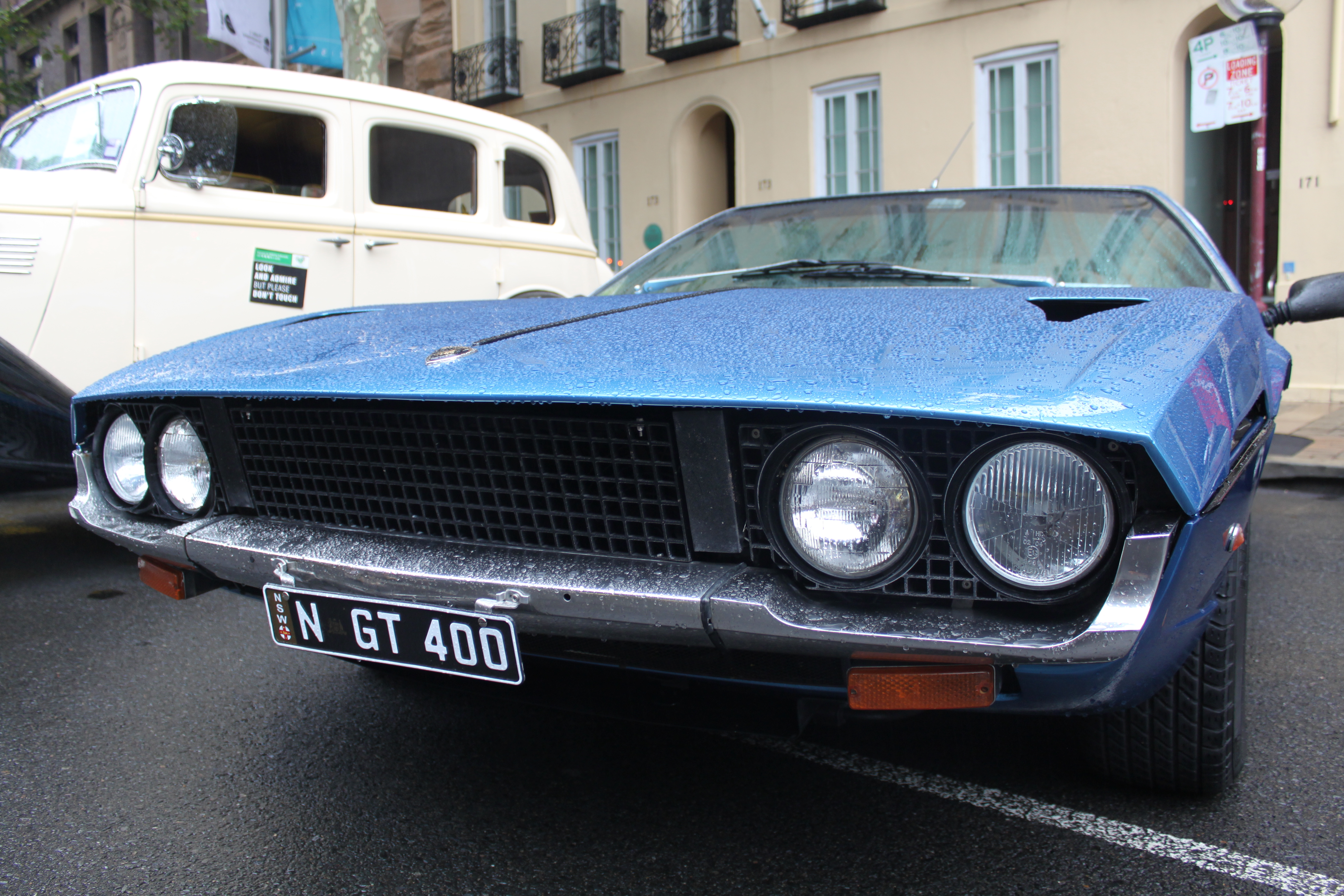
S3 grille with square mesh

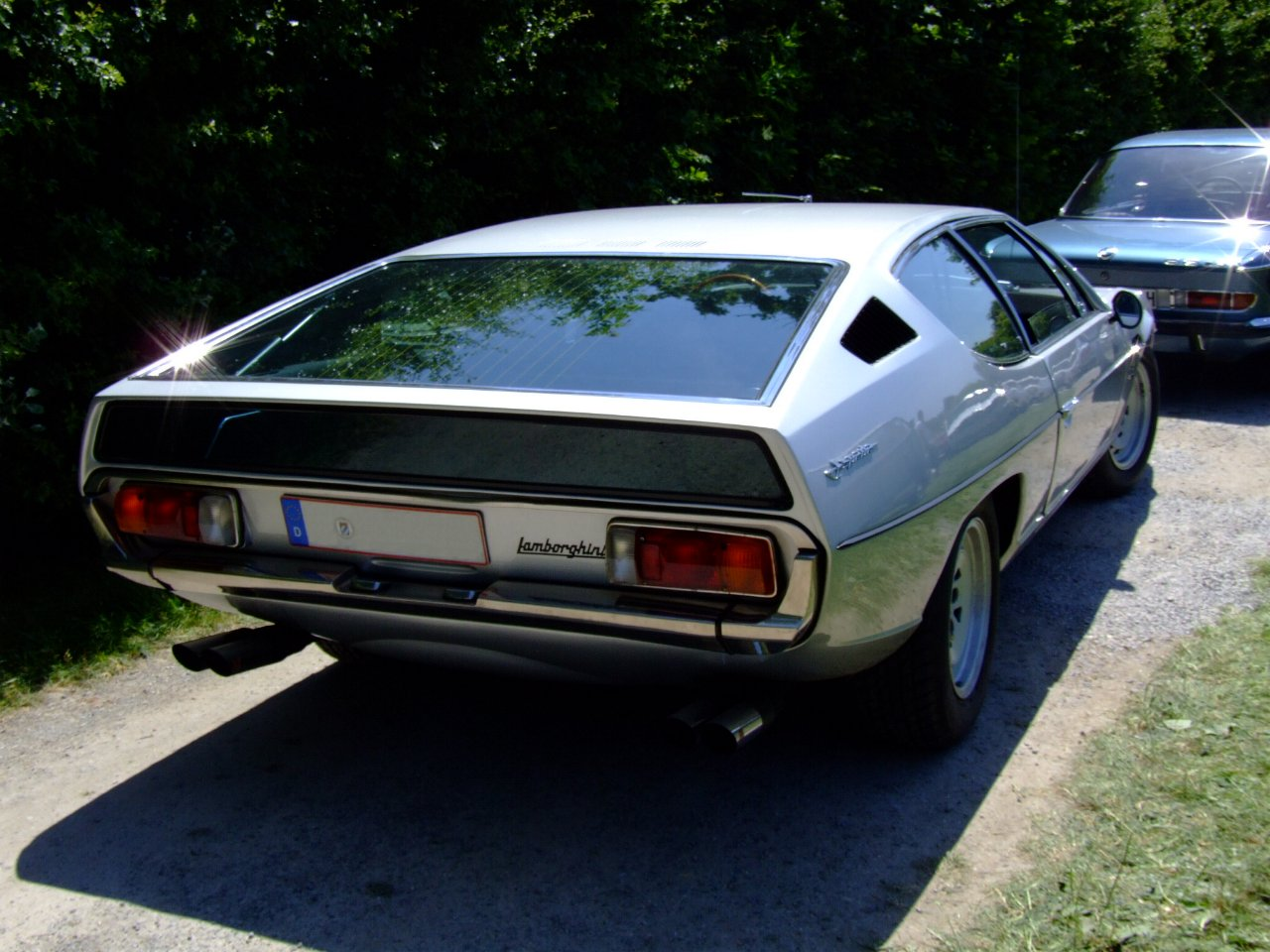
S3 rear view, showing later-style tail lights

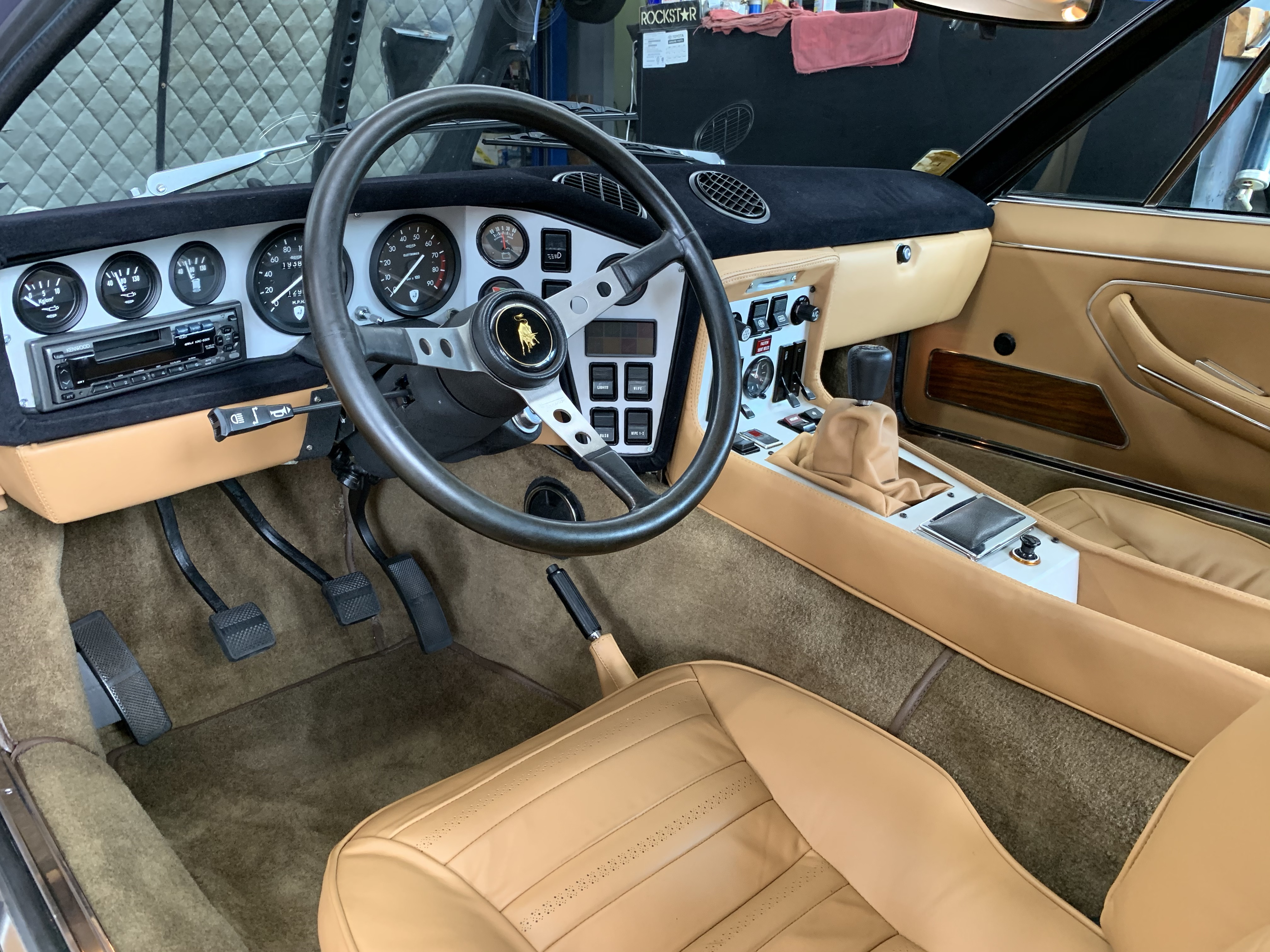
S3 interior, with redesigned aluminum-trimmed instrument panel

== Specifications ==
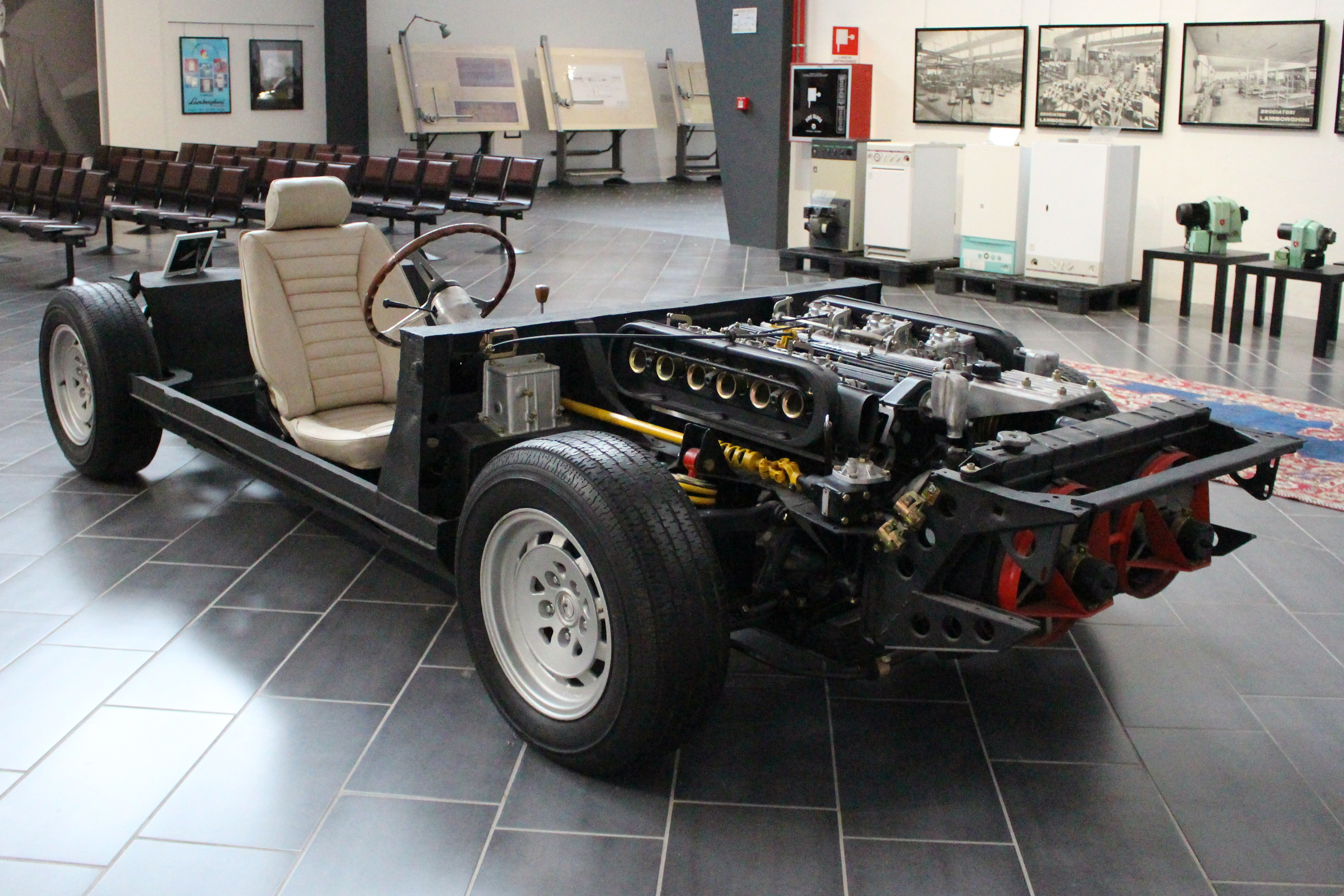
Lamborghini Espada semi-monocoque chassis

The Espada used a semi-monocoque unibody, constructed of pressed sheet steel and square section steel tubing. The hood was constructed of aluminum. This chassis was a new design manufactured by Marchesi of Modena, the firm that also constructed Miura and Islero chassis. Bare chassis were shipped from Marchesi to Bertone, where bodywork, paint and trim were added prior to final assembly at the Lamborghini factory. The steel chassis and bodywork suffered from rust issues, with journalist Denis Jenkinson observing visible rust on a car with 10,000 miles during a 1972 road test.

Suspension was based on the earlier 400 GT 2+2 design. It was fully independent, with unequal length double wishbones, coil springs, hydraulic shock absorbers and anti-roll bars. Four wheel disc brakes were manufactured by Girling. All calipers had three pistons, with larger calipers used in the front. Solid discs were used at first, with vented discs added for the Series II Espada. The steering box was a worm-and-peg type manufactured by ZF and mounted at the top front of the chassis, with a very long steering column. Power steering would be offered on the Series III Espadas. Series I and II Espadas were originally fitted with Pirelli Cinturato 205VR15 tyres (CN72), while Series II cars used 215/70VR15 Cinturato CN12 tyres.

Twin fuel tanks held 93 L (25 US gal) of gasoline. Two fuel fillers were hidden behind black cosmetic grilles in both C-pillars.

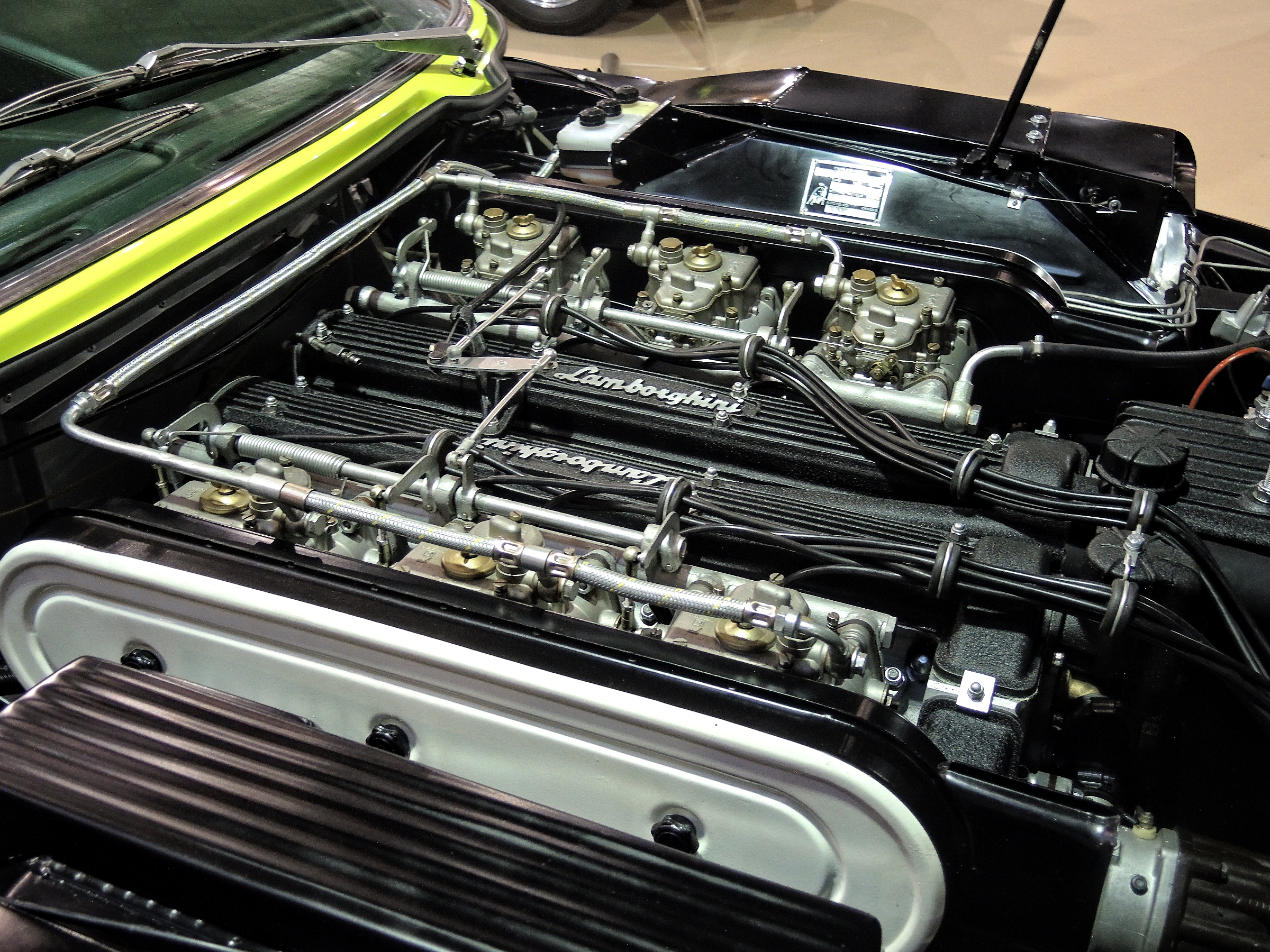
A Lamborghini Espada's V12 engine

The 3,929 cc (240 cu in) Lamborghini V12 engine was virtually unchanged from the engine used in the 400 GT 2+2. This engine, based on Giotto Bizzarrini's original design for Lamborghini, had an aluminum alloy crankcase with cast-iron cylinder liners, aluminum pistons, 24 valves (two per cylinder) and two chain-driven overhead camshafts per bank. Cylinder bore was 82 mm and stroke was 62 mm. Compression ratio on series I engines was 9.5:1, which increased to 10.7:1 in the series II/II engines. Six Weber 40DCOE side-draft carburetors were equipped, along with a single distributor for ignition. Wet sump lubrication was used, with an oil capacity of 14 litres (3.7 US gal). The weight of the engine alone was 232 kg (511 lb), or 293 kg (646 lb) including the transmission. Power output of series I cars was stated as 325 PS (239 kW; 321 hp) at 7,200 rpm, while Series II/III cars produced a stated 350 PS (257 kW; 345 hp) at 7,500 rpm.

The Espada's transmission was mounted longitudinally, inline with the engine. Most Espadas were equipped with a Lamborghini-designed 5-speed manual transmission with hydraulically operated clutch. The internal components of this transmission were identical to those used in the Miura and Islero, with the transmission casing also shared with the Islero but differing from the Miura, due to that model's transverse mid-engine layout.

From 1974, the Series III Espada could be ordered with a Chrysler Torqueflite 3 speed automatic transmission. This was an unpopular option, as acceleration and top speed were reduced. 55 Espadas were built with this transmission.

== Variants and related models ==
=== Prototype ===
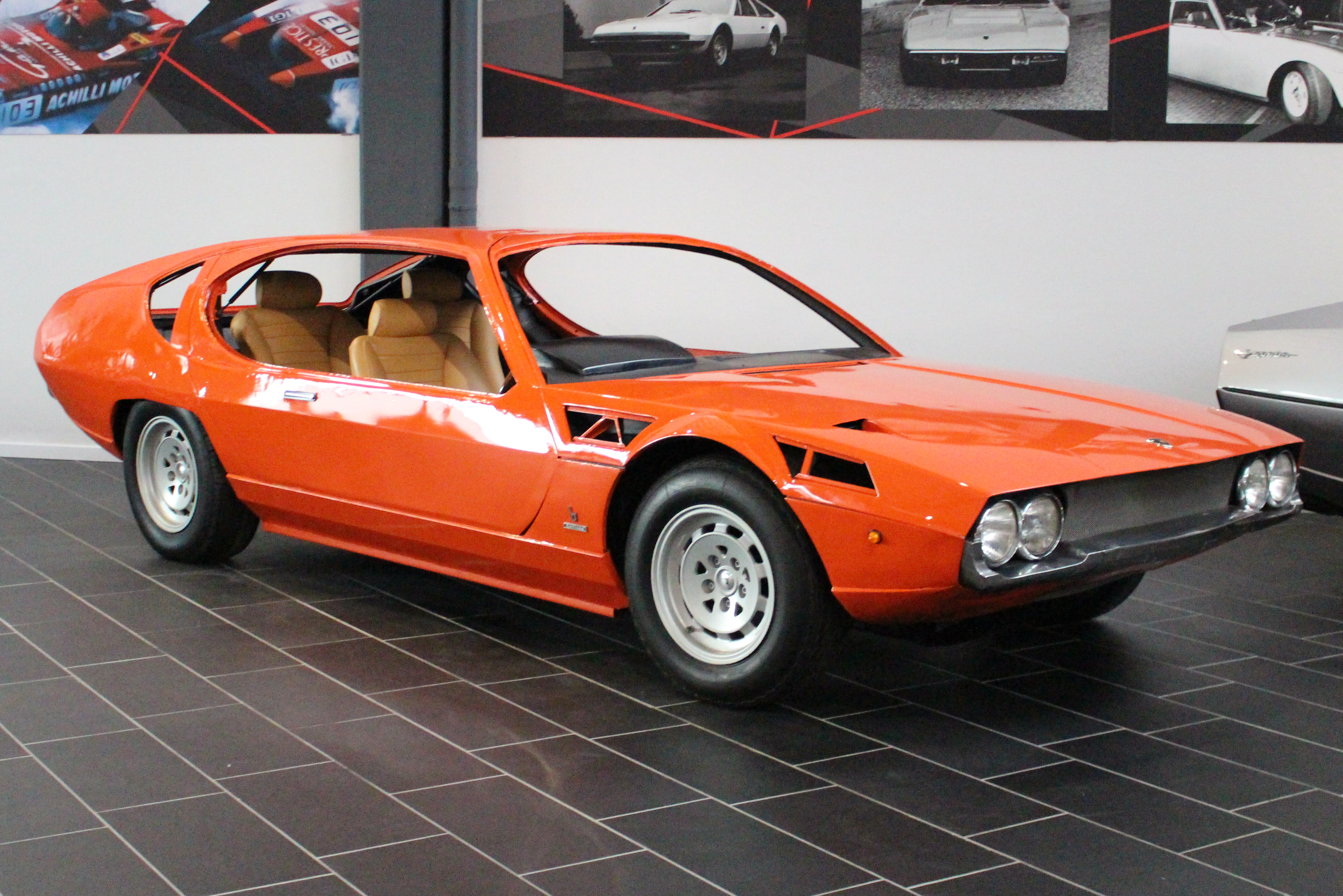
Espada prototype on display at Museo Ferruccio Lamborghini

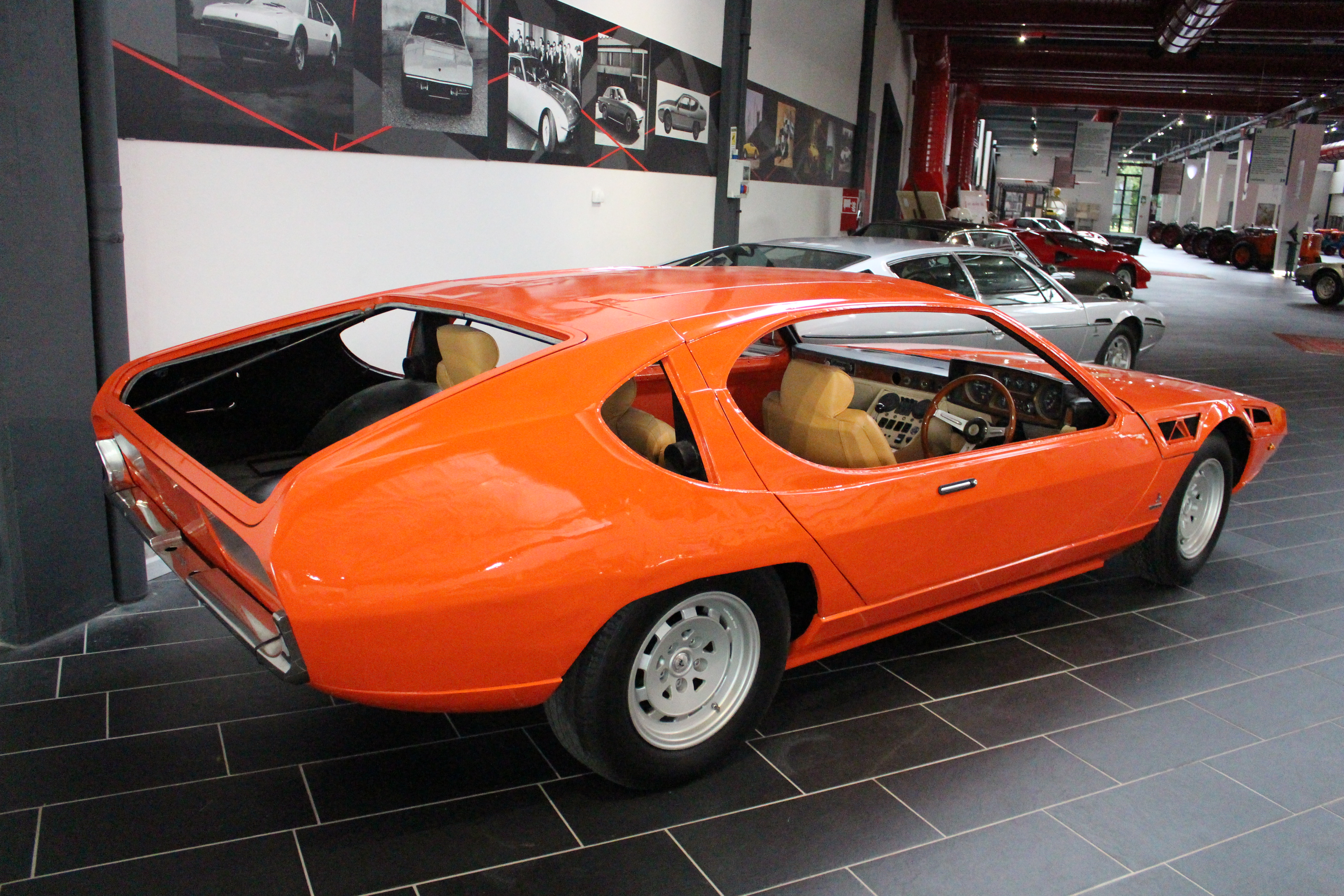

Following the 1967 debut of the Marzal, a prototype of what would become the Espada was constructed by Bertone and the Lamborghini factory. The wooden body buck made for the Jaguar Pirana concept car was used in the construction of this prototype. The design was visually in-between the Lamborghini Marzal, Pirana and the production series I Espada. It had the very low nose and gullwing doors of the Marzal, but a front end treatment much closer to the production Espada. An unusual configuration of multiple large side windows was designed, possibly to improve rear 3/4 vision. The engine, transmission and rear differential were all 400 GT units. This car was completed and driven by Lamborghini test drivers, but was subsequently stored uncovered in a field behind the Lamborghini factory. It is now in the collection of the Museo Ferruccio Lamborghini.

=== Lancomatic suspension prototype ===
One Espada was fitted with a prototype hydropneumatic self-levelling rear suspension called "Lancomatic". This car was shown at the 1968 Turin Auto Show, but remained a one-off experiment and did not enter production. The suspension system was developed in collaboration with Langen, a German company owned by the suspension component manufacturer Ehrenreich. This system was possibly developed in order to compete with the Ferrari 365 GT 2+2, which was also equipped with self-leveling rear suspension. According to Lamborghini test driver Bob Wallace, the Lancomatic suspension was promising but very costly and had significant technical issues, including seal failure due to heat and friction and harsh ride quality.

=== Lamborghini Faena ===
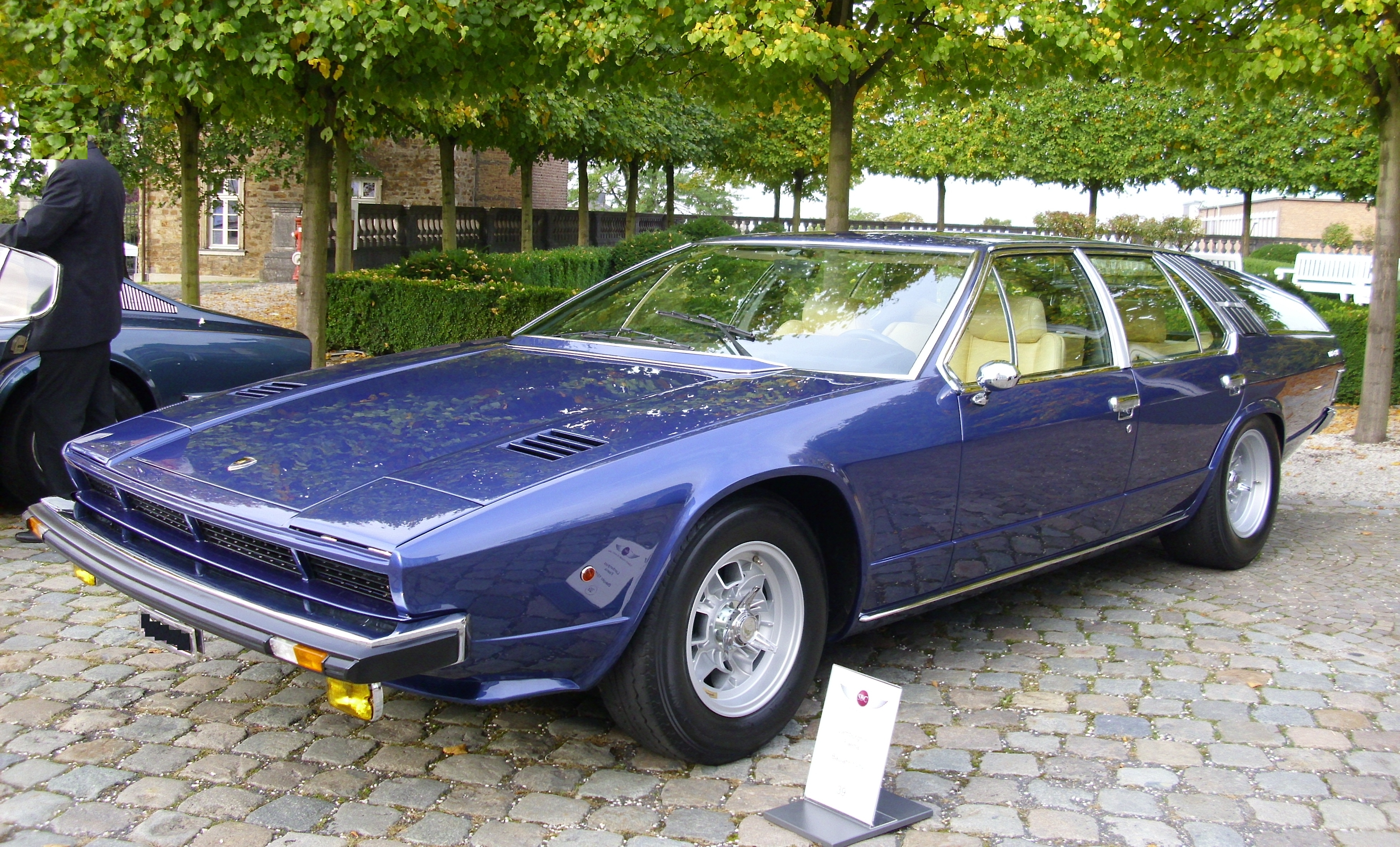
The one-off Lamborghini Faena was based on the Espada.

The Lamborghini Faena is a one-off 4-door saloon based on a Series II Espada and built by coachbuilder Pietro Frua. It debuted at the 1978 Turin Motor Show, and was later shown at the 1980 Geneva Motor Show. The Faena was built on the chassis of a 1974 Espada Series II (number 8224). Following this conversion, the chassis was renumbered to 18224. The Faena was constructed over a period of eight months. The chassis was reinforced and the wheelbase extended by 18 centimetres (7.1 in) to accommodate rear doors. As a result, it was significantly heavier than an Espada, weighing almost 2,000 kilograms (4,400 lb). The interior was luxuriously finished in white leather and the new bodywork incorporated taillights from a Citroën SM. After being exhibited at the 1980 Geneva Motor Show, the Faena was sold by Lamborghini dealer Lambo-Motor AG in Basel. It is currently owned by a Swiss collector.

The name Faena (literally, "job" or "chore") refers to the final stage of a Spanish-style bullfight.

=== Revival attempts ===
In 1999, a new version of the Espada was rumored to be in the works, but it was right at the time Lamborghini wanted to concentrate on a Diablo successor, so little became of the idea aside from a few drawings.

In 2006, Edmunds.com reported that Lamborghini intended to revive the Espada in 2009. Lamborghini presented the 4-seat Estoque concept car at the 2008 Paris Motor Show, however no production model has been forthcoming.
