= Lamborghini 400 GT =

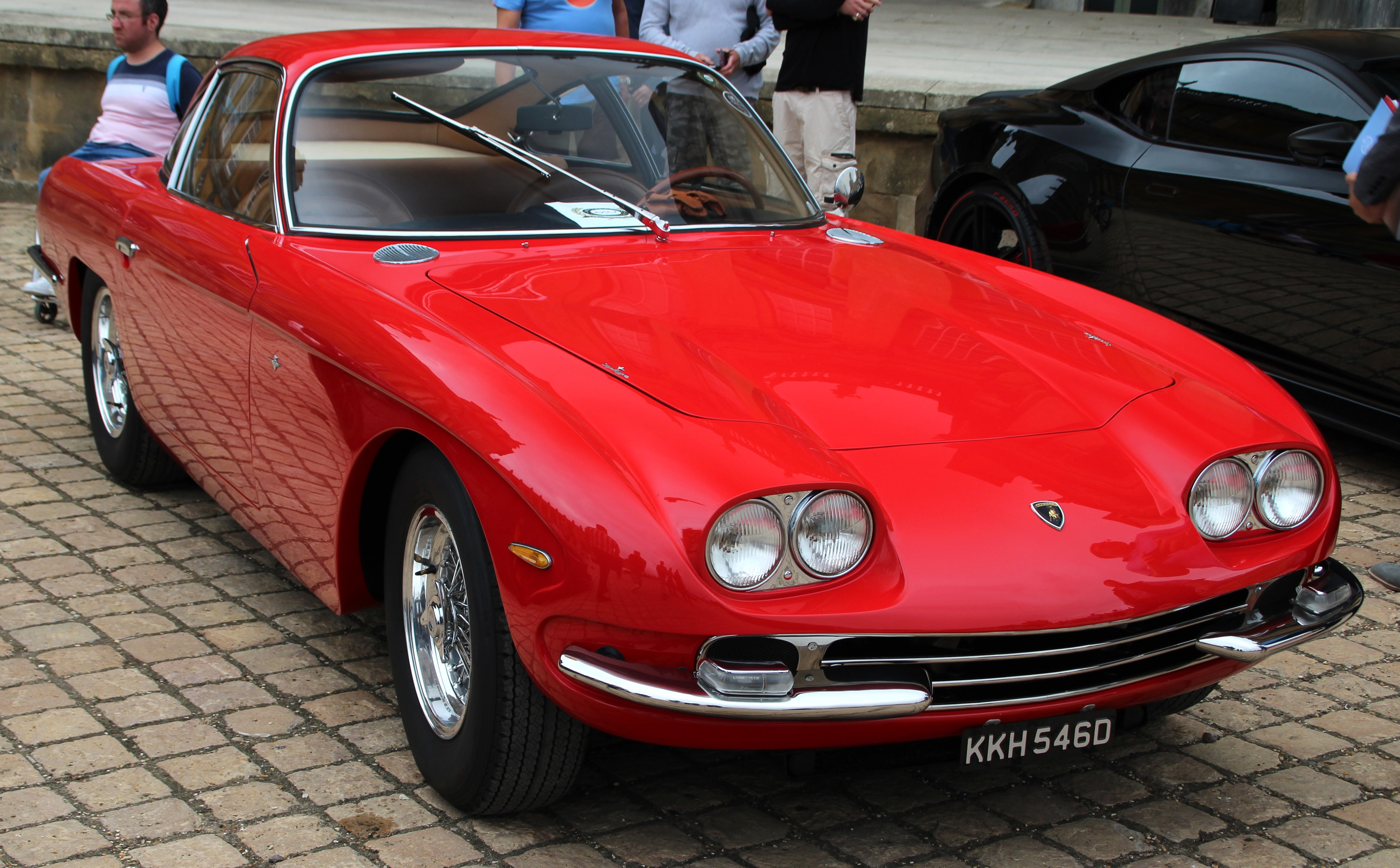
- 1966 Lamborghini 400 GT

Overview
- Manufacturer: Lamborghini
- Also called: Lamborghini 400 GT 2+2
- Production: 1966–1968; 247 built
- Assembly: Italy: Sant'Agata Bolognese
- Designer: Carrozzeria Touring

Body and chassis
- Class: Grand tourer
- Body style: 2-door coupé
- Layout: FR layout

Powertrain
- Engine: 3.9 L (3,929 cc) Lamborghini V12
- Transmission: 5-speed manual

Dimensions
- Wheelbase: 2,550 mm (100.4 in)
- Length: 4,470 mm (176.0 in)
- Width: 1,727 mm (68.0 in)
- Height: 1,257 mm (49.5 in)
- Kerb weight: 1,472 kg (3,245 lb)

Chronology
- Predecessor: Lamborghini 350 GT
- Successor: Lamborghini Islero; Lamborghini Espada (for 400 GT 2+2)

The Lamborghini 400 GT is the name given to two grand tourers produced by Italian manufacturer Lamborghini between 1966 and 1968.

== History ==
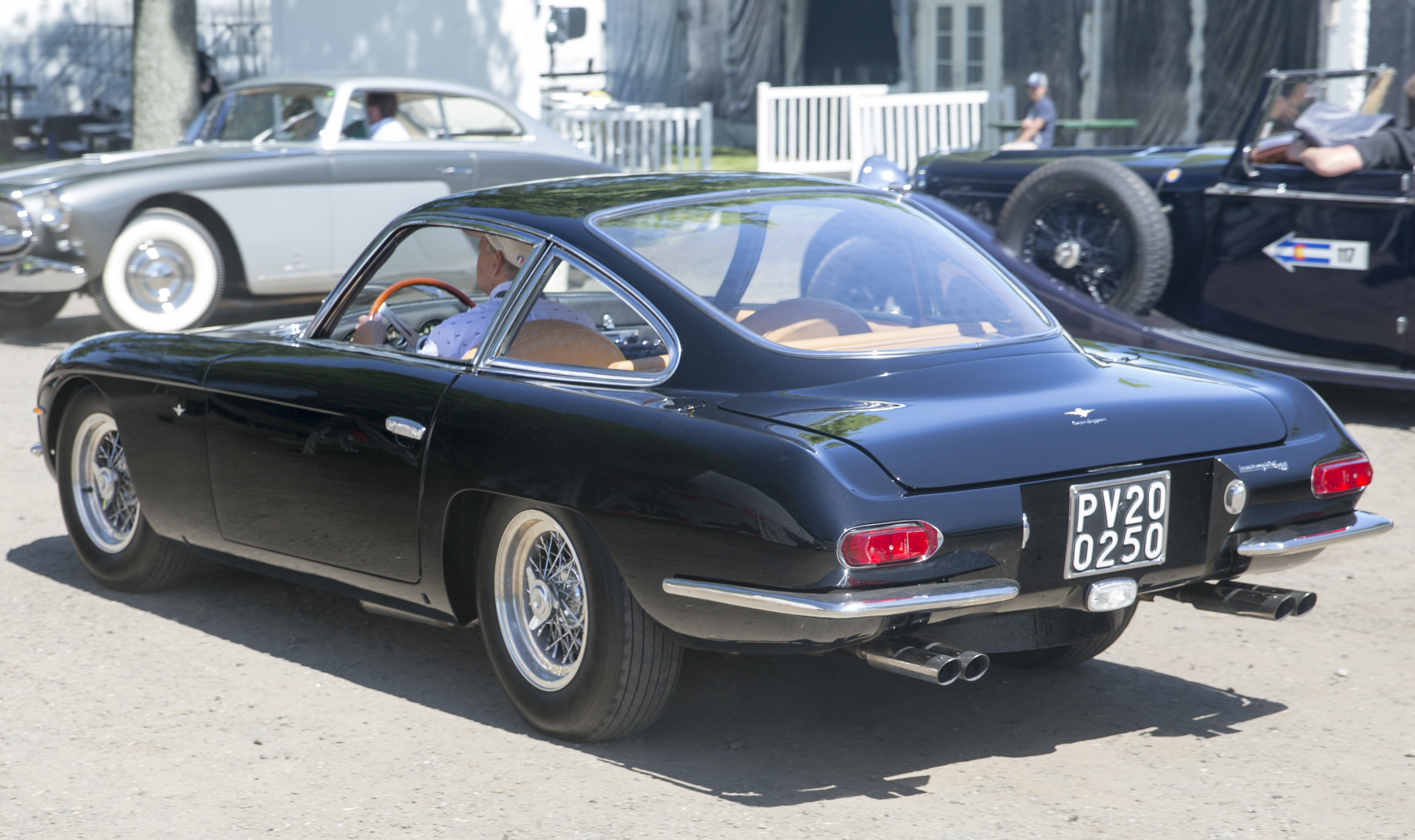
1966 Lamborghini 400 GT Interim

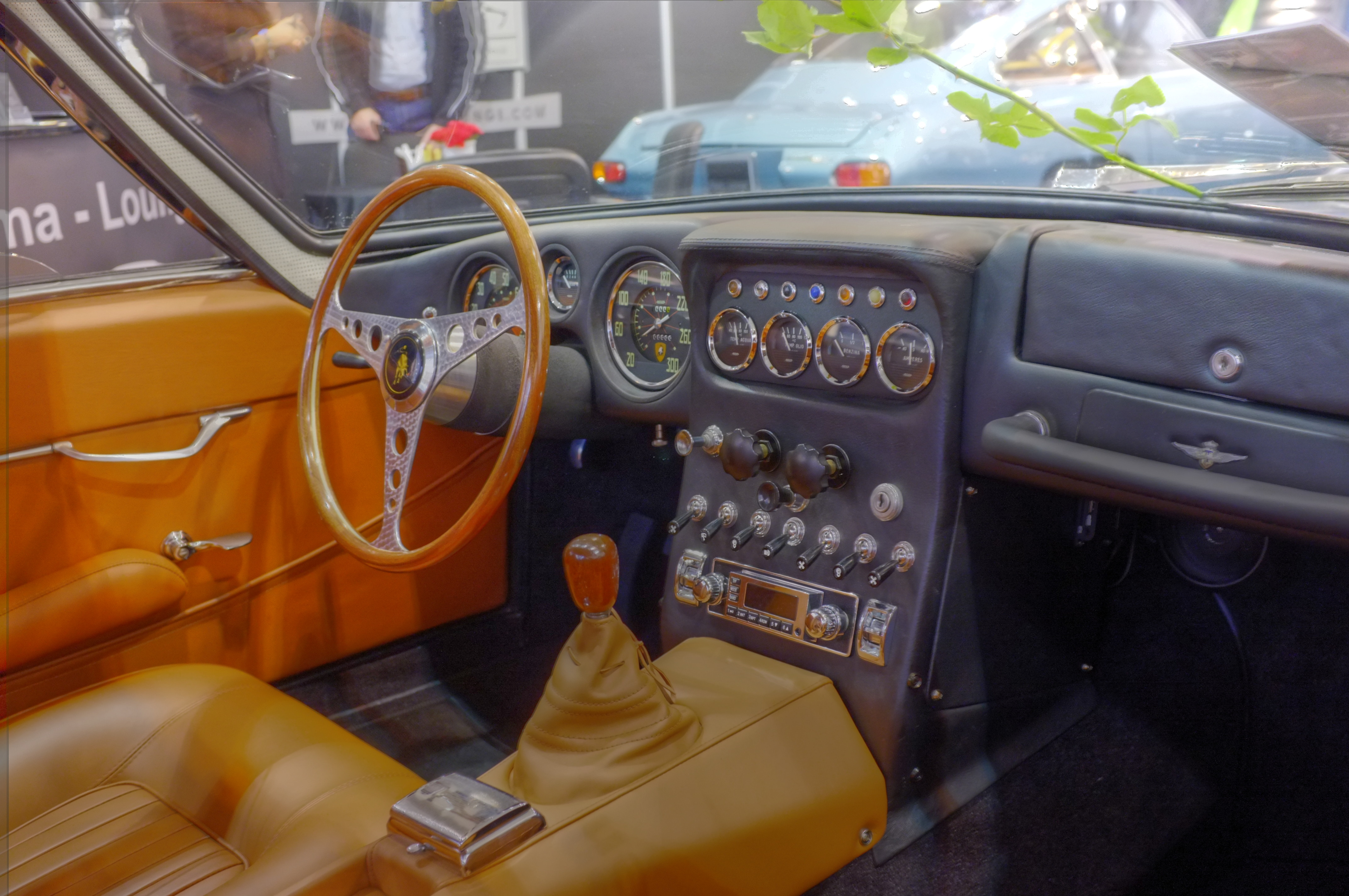
Lamborghini 400 GT interior

The first 400 GT, commonly referred to as simply the 400 GT or 400 GT Interim, was essentially the older 350 GT featuring an enlarged, 3,929 cc V12 engine, with a power output of 320 hp (235 kW). Twenty-three of these cars were built, with three featuring aluminium bodywork.

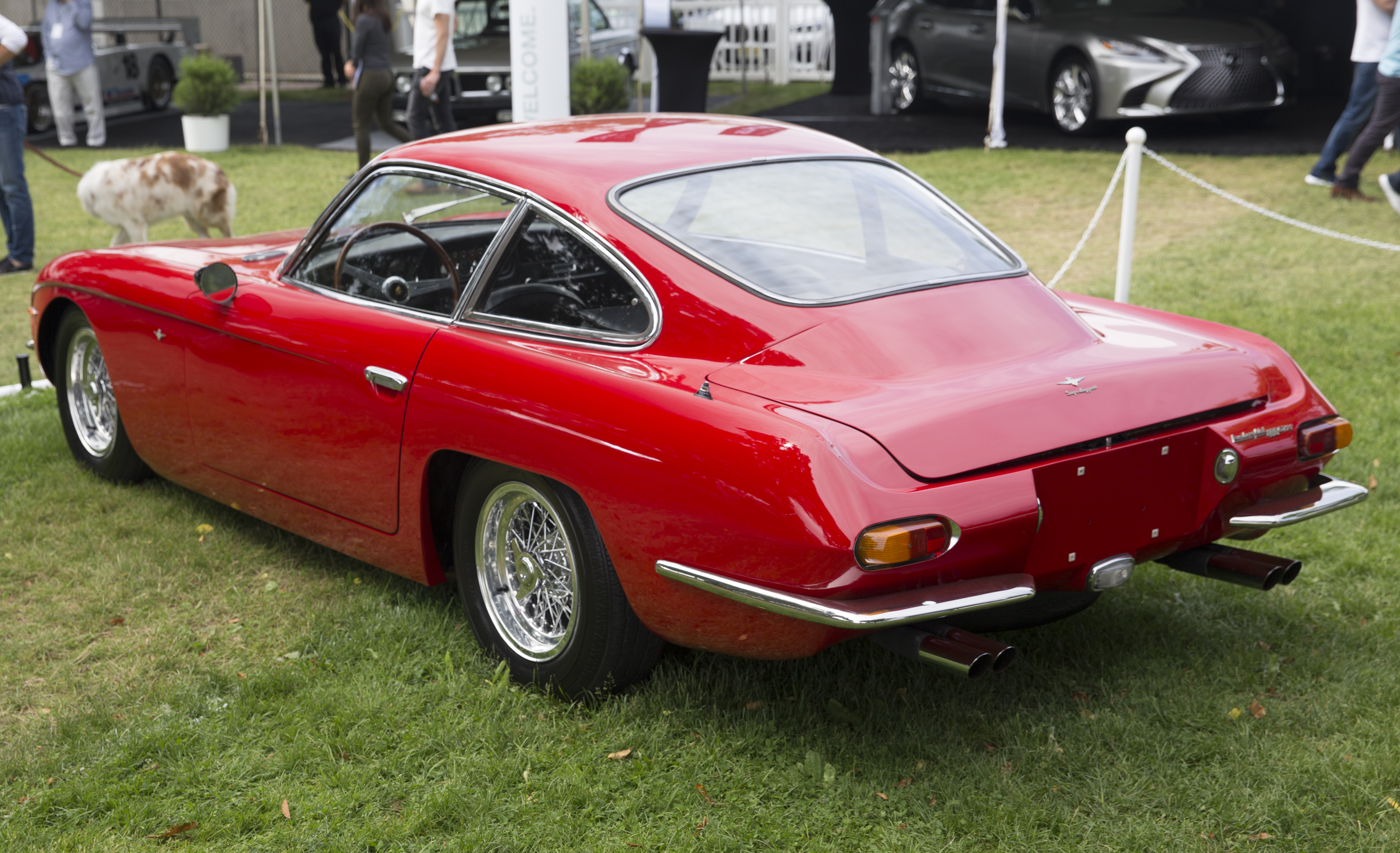
1967 Lamborghini 400 GT 2+2

The second 400 GT, commonly known as the 400 GT 2+2, was first presented at the 1966 Geneva Auto Show. The steel-bodied 2+2 has a different roofline with larger side windows and a smaller rear windshield, and subtle but thorough sheetmetal changes compared to the 350 GT and first 400 GT. The floorpan is slightly lower while the beltline is actually 66 mm (2.6 in) taller. The larger body shape enabled the +2 seating to be installed in the rear, where the 350 GT only had room for luggage or the rarely selected option of +1 seating. The bodywork revisions were carried out by Carrozzeria Touring, who also built the first examples, but after Touring's 1967 bankruptcy Marazzi took over production. The 400 GT 2+2 also had a Lamborghini designed gearbox, with Porsche-style synchromesh on all gears, which greatly improved the drivetrain. When leaving the factory the 400 GT was originally fitted with Pirelli Cinturato 205VR15 tyres (CN72).

A total of 23 units of the 400 GT Interim and 224 units of the 400 GT 2+2 were built from 1966 to 1968, when it was replaced with the Islero.

The 400 GT 2+2, 400 GT Interim and the 350 GT all shared the same 2,550 mm (100.4 in) wheelbase.

== 400 GT Monza ==
Lamborghini 400 GT Monza
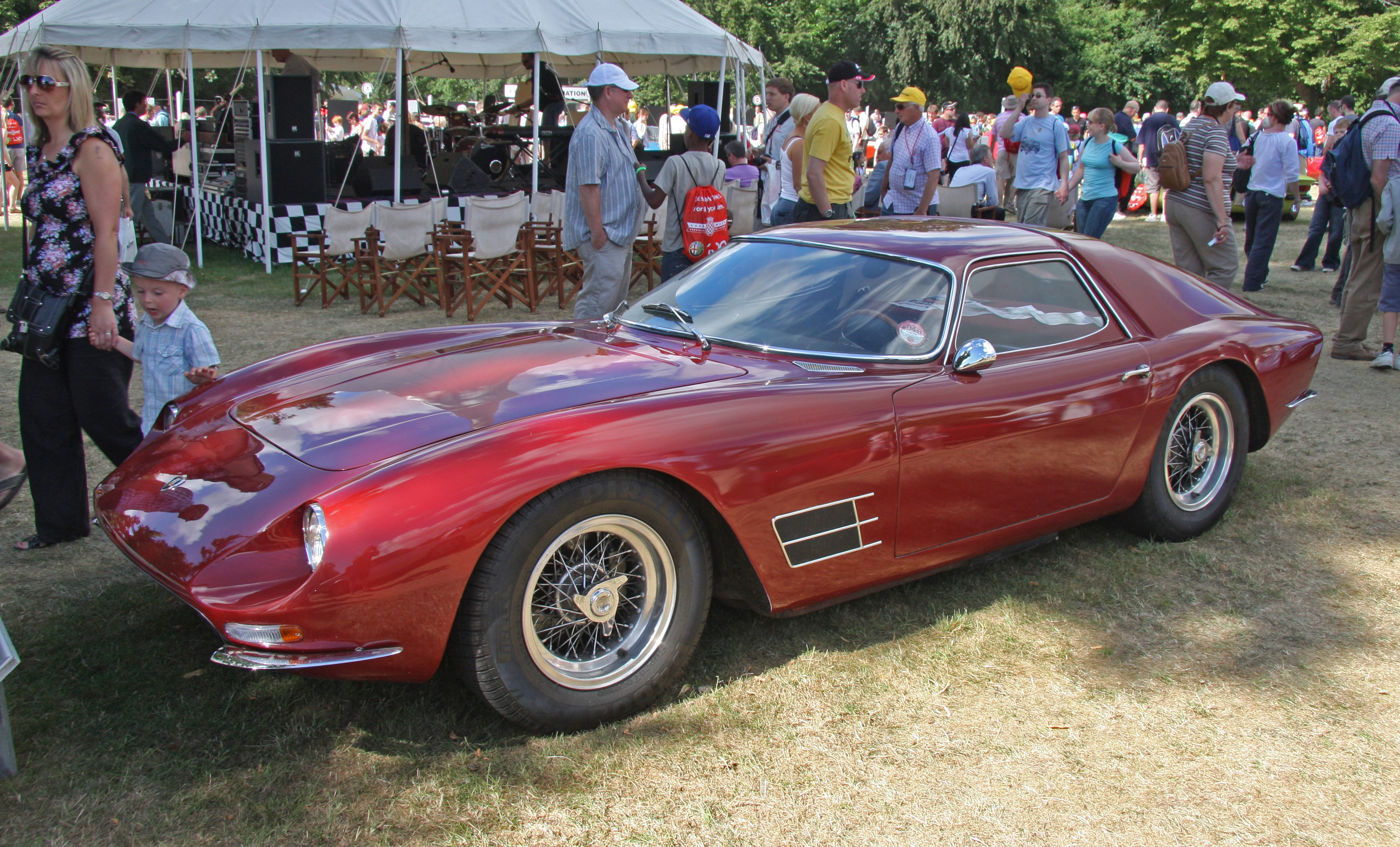

Overview
- Designer: Giorgio Neri, Luciano Bonacini

Body and chassis
- Body style: 2-seater coupé

The Lamborghini 400 GT Monza was a one-off two-seater gran turismo based on the 400 GT "Interim", featuring unique bodywork by the shop of Neri and Bonacini, who were already previously known for their work on the "Nembo" series of Ferraris.

Giorgio Neri and Luciano Bonacini were initially hired by Ferruccio Lamborghini in 1963 to construct the chassis of and assemble the first prototype Lamborghini, the 350 GTV. Following this, they supplied some early production chassis, before turning that job over to Marchesi once series production of the 350 GT was well underway.

Through this pre-existing relationship with Lamborghini, Neri and Bonacini were commissioned to create a one-off two-seater sports car based on a 350 GT chassis (number 01030) and a 400 GT V-12 engine. Possibly built for an unknown American client to race at the 24 Hours of Le Mans, the car was completed in 1966 and named the 400 GT Monza. The original name was the "400 GT Neri and Bonacini," but the final name Monza was eventually chosen due to its brevity and evocation of racing history. The aluminum body was hand built in the Neri and Bonacini shop and went through many revisions during the fabrication process. The final result was a distinctive fastback, with a long hood and Kamm tail. The designers integrated a roll bar into the extremely thick C-pillar, possibly increasing roll-over safety but compromising rearward visibility. Other details included a very low and raked windshield, prominent but non-functional air vent grilles behind the front wheels and stylized "400 Monza" badging. Overall, the design shows visual similarities to other contemporary Italian sports cars, including a striking resemblance to the Bizzarrini 5300 GT Strada.

Homologation problems prevented the car from ever racing and the American customer who commissioned it apparently never received the car. It was instead displayed at the 1967 Barcelona Motor Show on the Lamborghini importer Amato's stand. A wealthy Spaniard purchased it at the show and the 400 GT Monza remained in his family after his death in the early 1990s. In 1996, auction house Brooks (now Bonhams) discovered the car in storage when they were contacted by the family of the now deceased owner to appraise some other cars. After nine years of negotiations, the car was finally sold at Bonhams' December 2005 auction in London for £177,500 GBP.

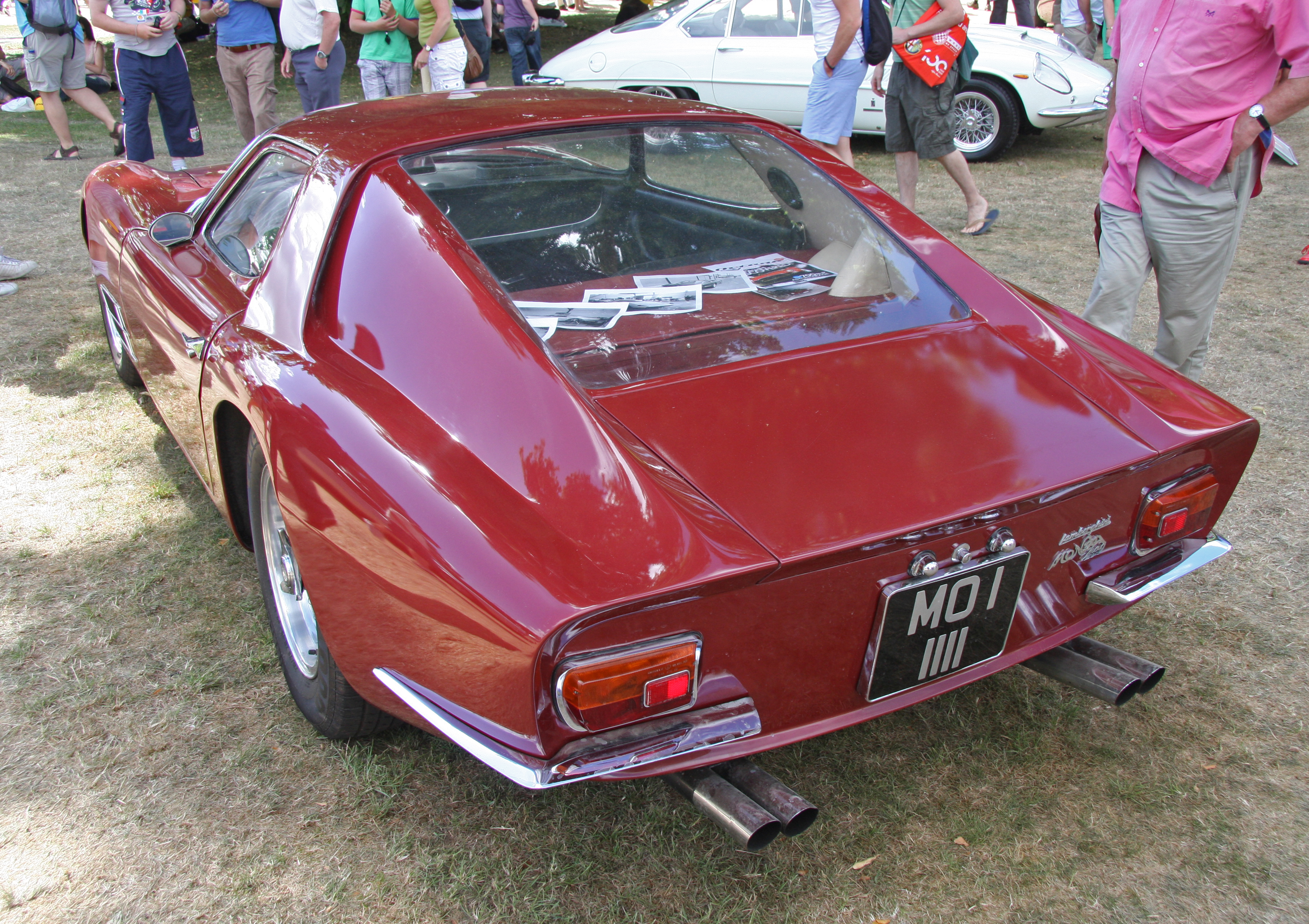
400 GT Monza Rear view

== See also ==
- Lamborghini Flying Star II, a one-off concept car built by Carrozzeria Touring based on the 400 GT.
