= Sant'Agata Bolognese =

- Comune
- Comune di Sant'Agata Bolognese
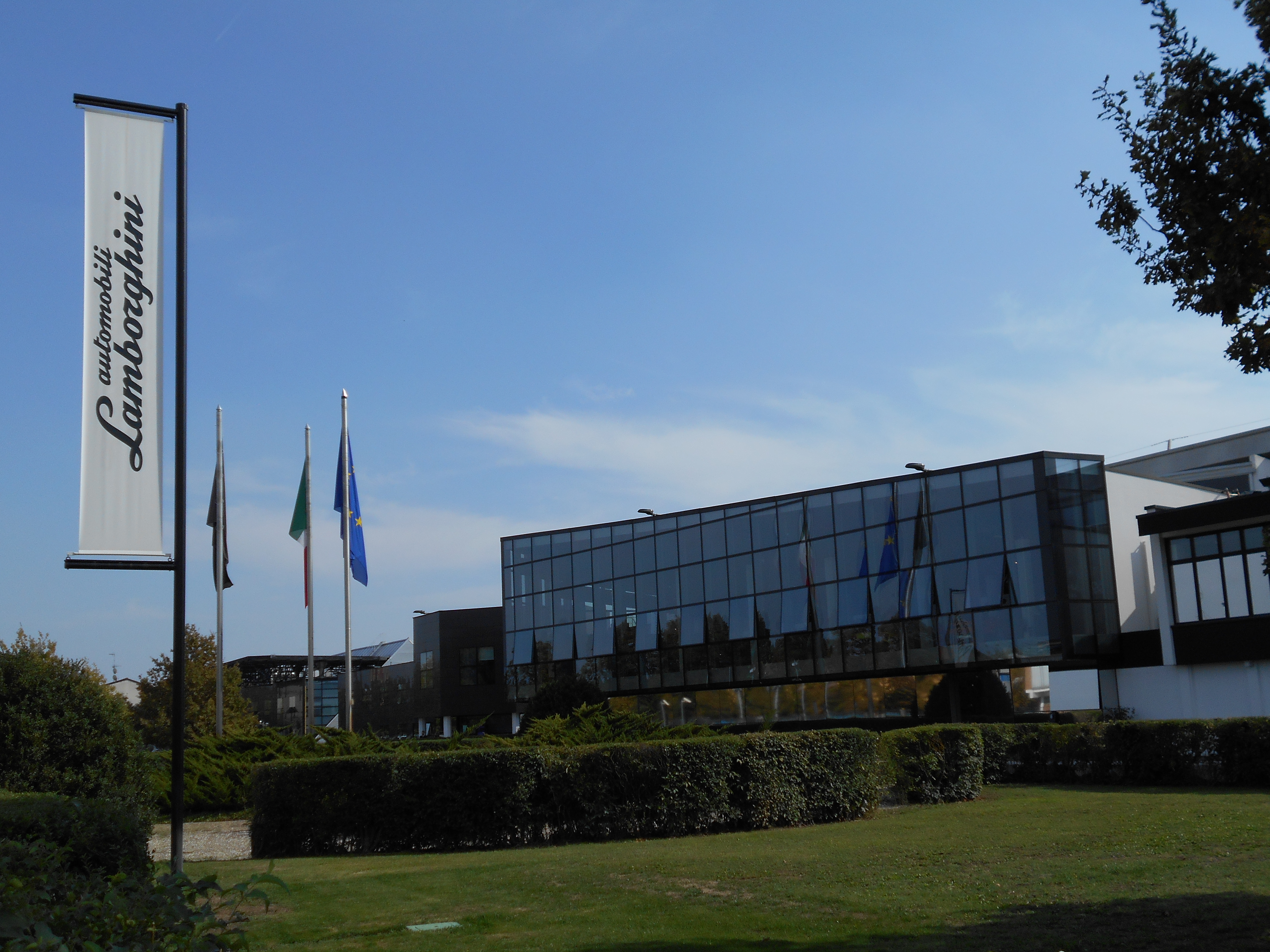
- Headquarters of Lamborghini

- Coat of arms

- Location within Italy Location within Emilia-Romagna
- Coordinates: 44°39′45″N 11°08′00″E
- Country: Italy
- Region: Emilia-Romagna
- Metropolitan city: Bologna (BO)

Government
  - Mayor: Giuseppe Vicinelli

Area
  - Total: 34 km^{2} (13 sq mi)
- Elevation: 21 m (69 ft)

Population (31 December 2014)
  - Total: 7,283
  - Density: 210/km^{2} (550/sq mi)
- Demonym: Santagatesi
- Time zone: UTC+1 (CET)
  - Summer (DST): UTC+2 (CEST)
- Postal code: 40019
- Dialing code: 051
- Patron saint: St. Agatha
- Website: Official website

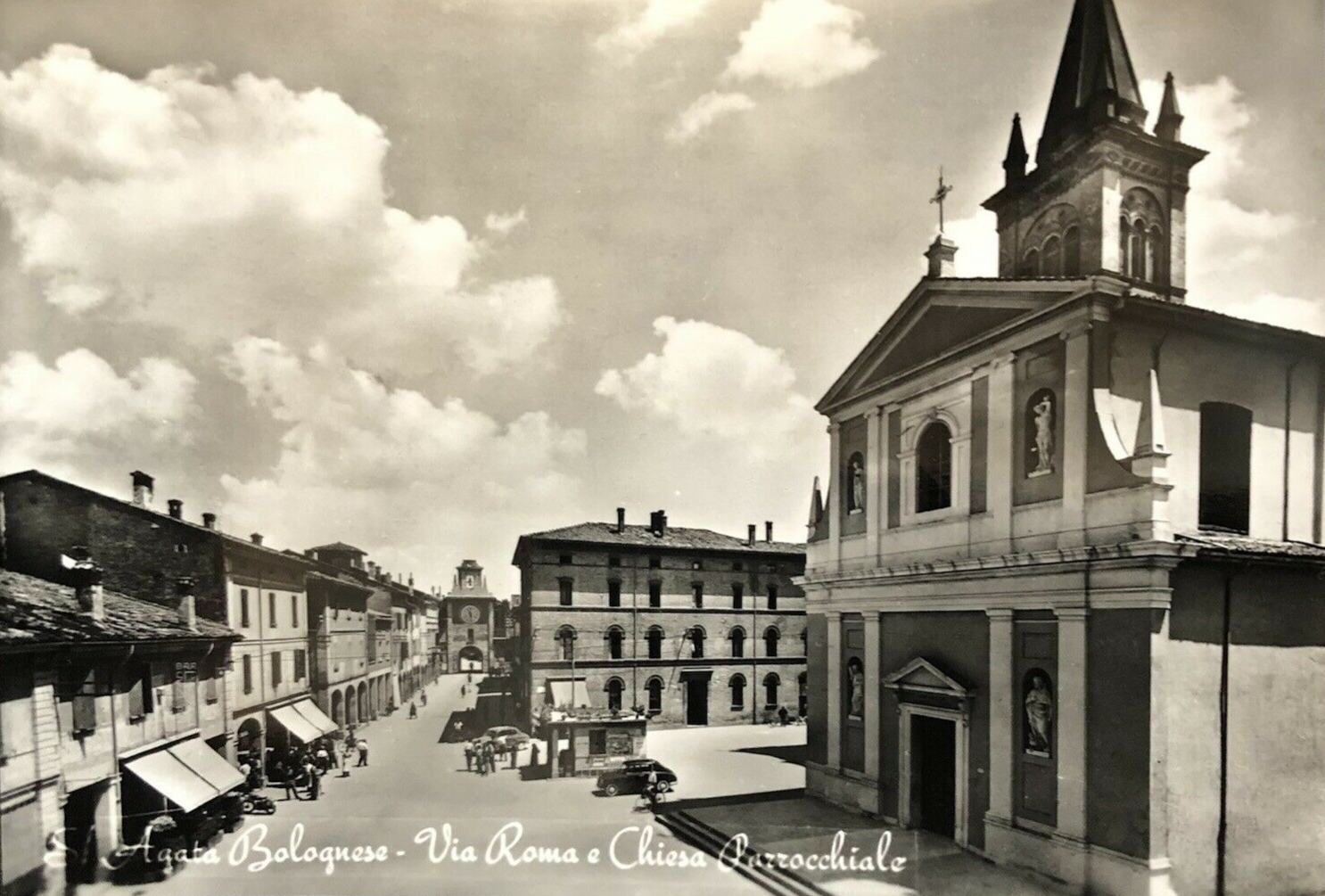
Sant'Agata Bolognese in 1955

Sant'Agata Bolognese (Western Bolognese: Sant'Èghete; City Bolognese: Sant'Ègata) is a small comune in the Metropolitan City of Bologna, Emilia-Romagna, in the north of Italy. It is notable for being the headquarters of the luxury automobile manufacturer Automobili Lamborghini.

It is named after Saint Agatha of Sicily.

== Economy ==
From the industry it is internationally known for hosting the headquarters of Lamborghini, which emerged as a company producing agricultural machinery, and later became a company of luxury automobiles.

== Famous people ==
- Nilla Pizzi, singer
- Cinzia Bomoll, writer
- Luciano Bovina, photoreporter and documentarian
- Gilberto Canu, architect and writer
- Ferruccio Lamborghini, founder of Lamborghini

== Demographics ==
Historical population

Year	Pop.	±%
1861	3,799	—
1871	4,115	+8.3%
1881	3,934	−4.4%
1901	4,115	+4.6%
1911	4,449	+8.1%

Year	Pop.	±%
1921	4,895	+10.0%
1931	5,327	+8.8%
1936	5,286	−0.8%
1951	5,348	+1.2%
1961	4,812	−10.0%

Year	Pop.	±%
1971	4,641	−3.6%
1981	4,703	+1.3%
1991	4,927	+4.8%
2001	5,973	+21.2%
2018	7,344	+23.0%

Source: ISTAT Source
