= Flying Star =

Flying Star may refer to:

- Flying Star (restaurant), a fast food chain in Albuquerque, USA
- Flying Star Feng Shui
- Lamborghini Flying Star II, a concept car
- A nickname for stars with high proper motion:
  - Piazzi's Flying Star, otherwise known as 61 Cygni
  - Groombridge 1830
