= Lamborghini Flying Star II =

One-off concept car produced by Lamborghini (1966)

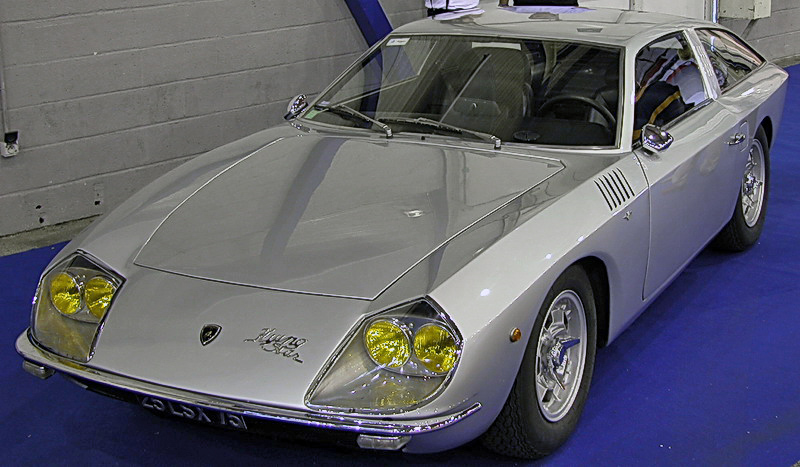

Overview
- Manufacturer: Lamborghini, Carrozzeria Touring
- Also called: Lamborghini 400 GT Flying Star II
- Production: 1966
- Designer: Carlo Felice Bianchi Anderloni for Carrozzeria Touring

Body and chassis
- Body style: 2-door shooting-brake
- Layout: FR layout
- Related: Lamborghini 400 GT

Powertrain
- Engine: 3.9 L Lamborghini V12 engine
- Transmission: 5-speed manual

Dimensions
- Wheelbase: 2,550 mm (100.4 in)
- Length: 4,380 mm (172.4 in)
- Width: 1,720 mm (67.7 in)
- Height: 1,200 mm (47.2 in)
- Curb weight: 1,300 kg (2,866 lb)

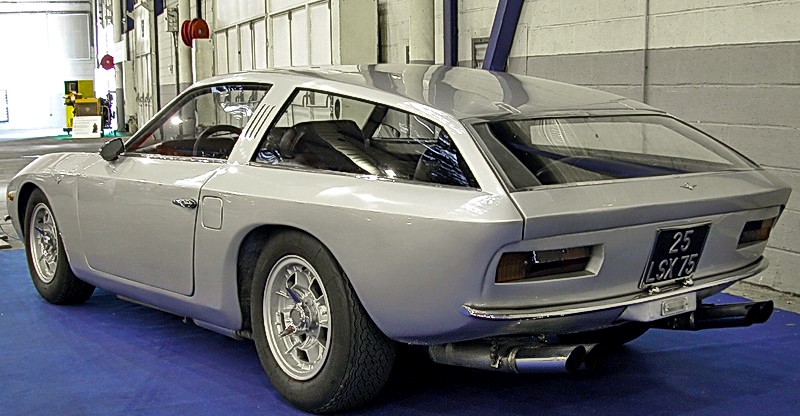
Lamborghini Flying Star II rear view

The Lamborghini Flying Star II (also named Lamborghini 400 GT Flying Star II) was a one-off concept car built by Carrozzeria Touring Superleggera in 1966 on a Lamborghini 400 GT chassis. It debuted at the 1966 Turin Auto Show.

In 1966, Carrozzeria Touring Superleggera of Milan explored a new design concept. Their long relation with Lamborghini was celebrated with the Flying Star II, a fully functional prototype with a design that was unconventional for the time. It was a two-seater with a very low and compact two-volume shooting brake bodywork, with a hatchback-style rear door. The design team for the Flying Star II was led by Carlo Anderloni.

The name "Flying Star II" was a reference to the Touring "Flying Star" roadsters of the prewar period, designed by Giuseppe Seregni and built on Isotta Fraschini and Alfa Romeo chassis.

The Flying Star was built on the chassis and drive train of the 400 GT production model, sharing its 3.9 L Lamborghini V12 engine, 5 speed manual transmission, fully independent suspension and four wheel disc brakes. The chassis was shortened by 100 millimetres (3.9 in) compared to the production 400 GT.

This would be the last design to come out of Carrozzeria Touring Superleggera, before the company was revived in 2006 and introduced the A8GCS Berlinetta Touring based on a Maserati drivetrain in 2008.

Currently on exposition in VW dealership in Radom, Poland.
