= Hudson Italia =

Two-seat sports car produced and marketed by Hudson and American Motors

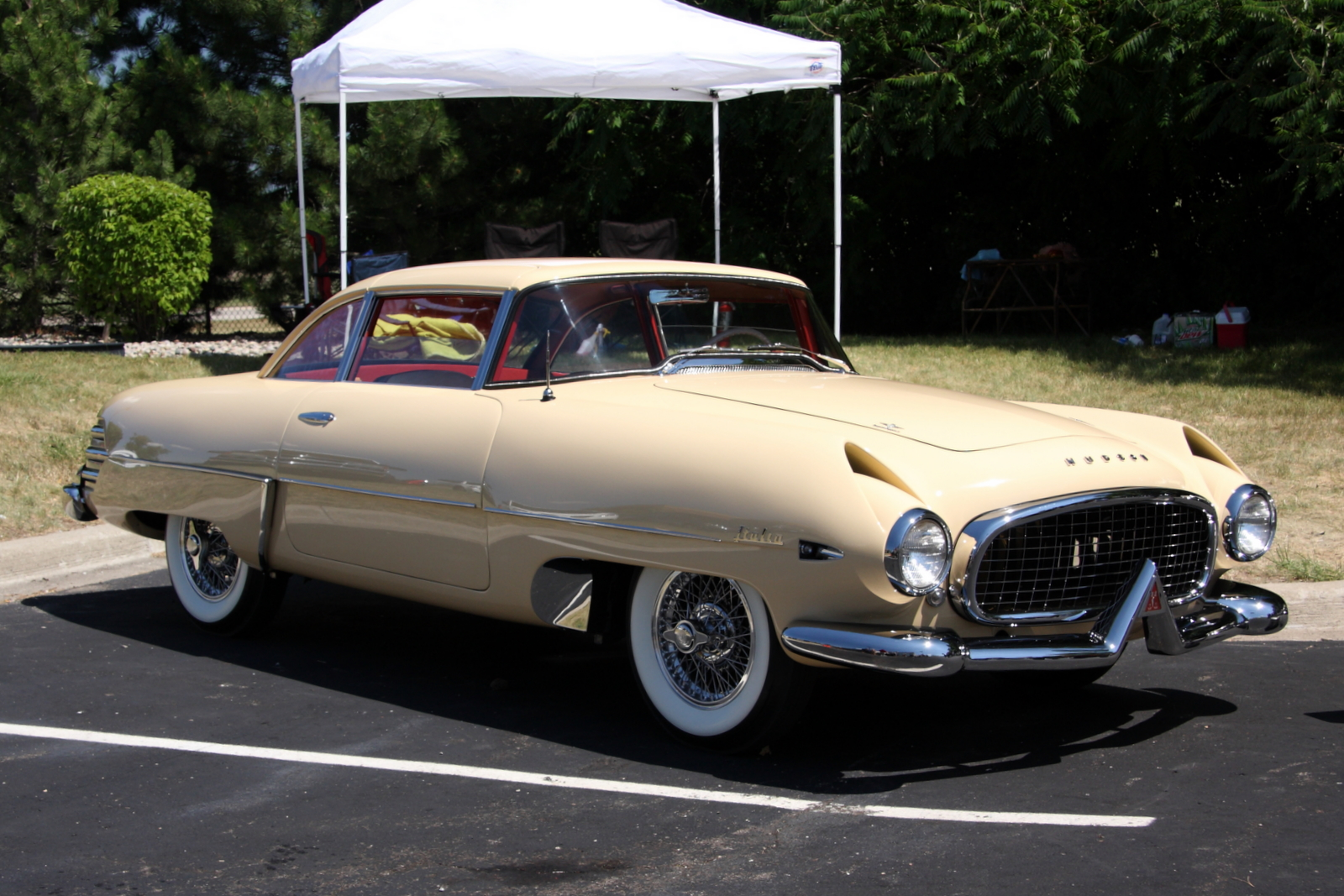

Overview
- Manufacturer: Hudson Motor Car Company; American Motors Corporation
- Production: 1953–1954; 26 built
- Assembly: Carrozzeria Touring, Milan, Italy
- Designer: Frank Spring

Body and chassis
- Class: coupé, grand tourer
- Body style: 2-door coupé
- Layout: FR layout

Powertrain
- Engine: 202 cu in (3.3 L) I6
- Transmission: 3-speed manual

Dimensions
- Wheelbase: 105 in (2,667 mm)
- Length: 183 in (4,648 mm)
- Width: 70 in (1,778 mm)
- Height: 54 in (1,372 mm)
- Curb weight: 2,710 lb (1,229 kg)

The Hudson Italia is an automobile styling study and a limited production two-door compact coupé that was produced by the Hudson Motor Car Company of Detroit, Michigan, in cooperation with Carrozzeria Touring of Italy, and subsequently marketed by American Motors Corporation (AMC) during the 1954 and 1955 model years.

Designed by Frank Spring with input from Carlo Felice Bianchi Anderloni of Carrozzeria Touring, and introduced on 14 January 1954, the Italia was based on the Hudson Jet platform and running gear featuring a unique body and interior.

== Development ==
During the early-1950s, Hudson began several product development programs that included the Hornet, a six-cylinder engine, the Jet, and the project that became the Italia. The management at Hudson Motors sought the publicity that Chrysler received from their work with Ghia and the resulting show cars. The Hudson Italia concept was to replicate the notoriety of concept cars such as the Chrysler Ghia Specials (1951–1953). The original idea "was to create a fast, sporty car, based on the hotfooted Hudson Hornet" and also for competition in the Carrera Panamericana. A flagship European-inspired experimental sports coupe that might rival Corvette, Nash Healey, Kaiser Darrin, or the Ford Thunderbird, which was then not yet marketed. The objective was to increase Hudson's brand recognition and gauge public reaction to styling ideas.

During the development of the Hudson Jet line, chief designer Frank Spring wanted to bring a low-slung stylish car to Hudson's model range. Hudson's management "demanded ill-advised changes" that made the Jet look "dowdier" than Frank Spring had intended. To compensate, they "gave the unhappy Spring permission to build an 'experimental' sports car based on Jet mechanicals." Spring was contemplating seeking employment at other design studios. He wanted to design a sports coupe that might rival the first six-cylinder Chevrolet Corvette, but with European-inspired flair and grand touring luxury.

Lacking sufficient capital to develop a new model, Hudson reached an agreement for a prototype to be built in Milan by Carrozzeria Touring. A complete Hudson Jet was shipped to Italy. A new body design, based on sketches by Frank Spring, was formed over a steel tubular frame. This unibody system of aluminum panels was known as superleggera (equivalent to "very lightweight" in Italian), and "was expensive and fairly revolutionary in its day." The work done by Carrozzeria Touring was under the supervision of Spring and Hudson's vice-president, Stuart Baits. The Italia was the only project that Carrozzeria Touring undertook for a U.S. automaker.

The cost to Hudson for this concept car was reported to be only $28,000. It was a curious mix of Italian flair with American flash. After the prototype was completed in September 1953, Spring and his wife drove it around Italy.

The car was shipped to the United States to be displayed at numerous Hudson dealerships across the country by late 1953, and it received positive customer reactions. It was exhibited at automobile shows in the U.S. and some in Europe, as well as at the International Sports Car Show held in January 1954.

This car first appeared under the "Super Jet" name and featured numerous advancements, including its aluminum body, wraparound windshield (reminiscent of the 1953 Corvette), doors that cut 14 inches (356 mm) into the roof (also called aircraft doors) for easier entry and exit. the Italia was 9 in (229 mm) lower than the Jet, and rode on a 100 in (2,540 mm) wheelbase. The prototype also featured Borrani chrome wire wheels and its column-mounted three-speed transmission included an overdrive unit.

== Design ==
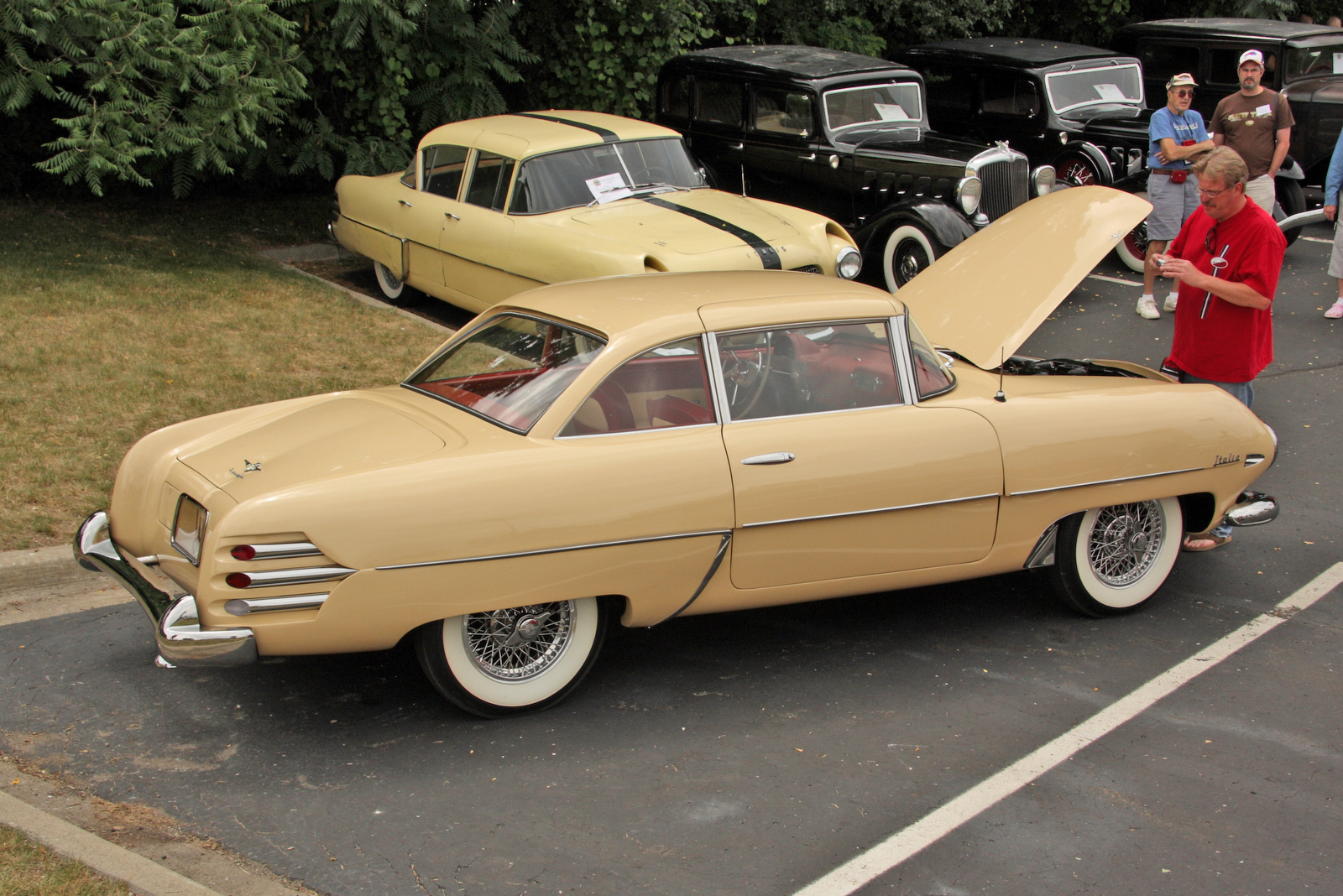
Hudson Italia rear view

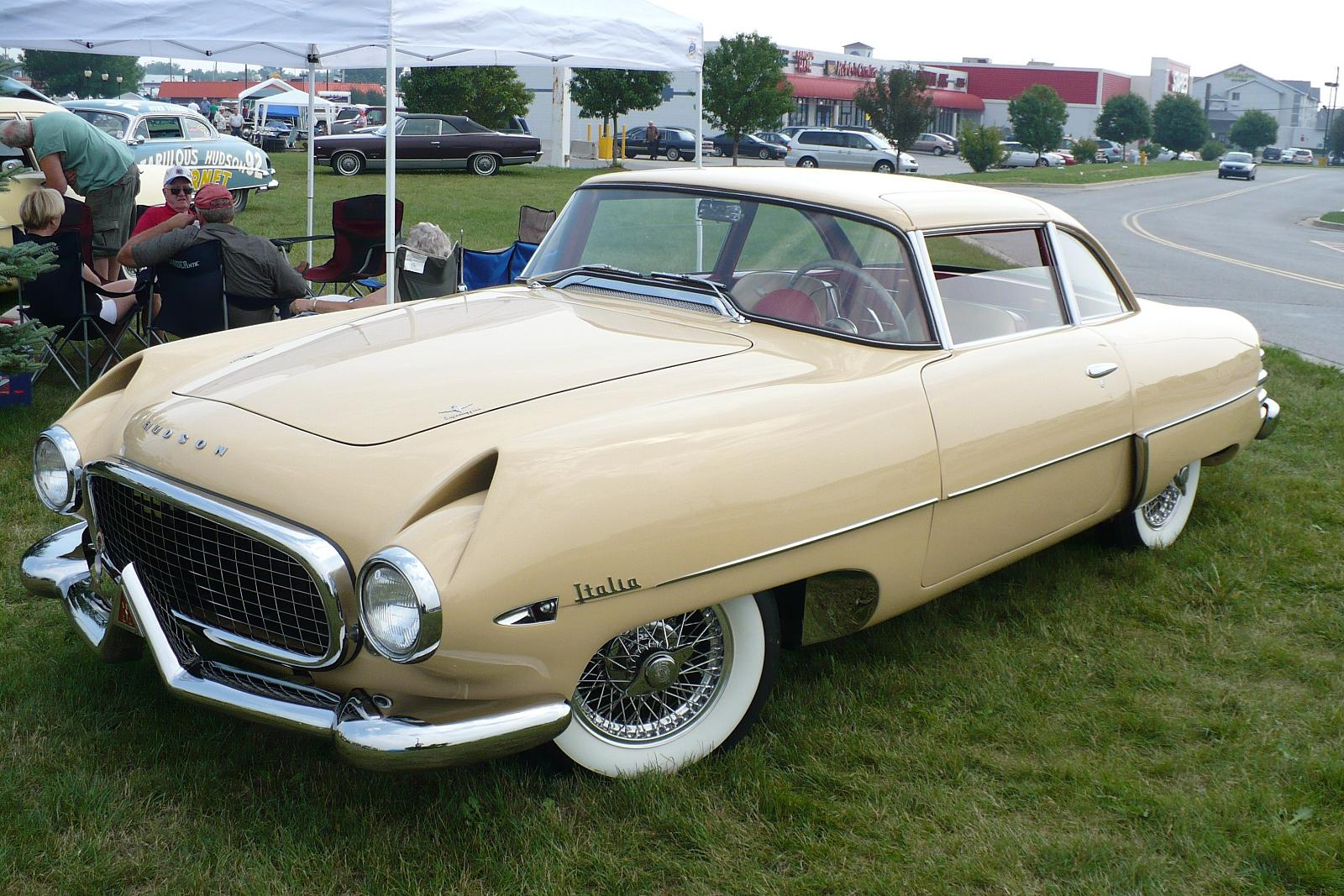
1954 Hudson Italia

Carrozzeria Touring's construction technique of a thin-wall tubing superstructure covered by hand-formed aluminum panels was used by several European automakers for their lightweight racing models; however, the Hudson's Jet unit construction required using the regular car's production floorpan and cowl, thus effectively negating any weight savings for the Italia.

While styling for the Jet was conservative, the Italia was anything but and unlike any previous Hudson. The Italia was 10 inches (254 mm) lower than a Jet. Over the headlights, the front fenders featured V-shaped scoops to seemingly duct cooling air to the front brakes. However, they actually only vent "the underside of the fender and the top of the tire." The front bumper features a large inverted "V" (the trademark Hudson triangle, inverted) in the center that angles up and overlaps the grille work. Rear quarter scoops are to cool the rear brakes. In the back of the car, the tail, directional, and backup lamps are tipped by the ends of three stacked chrome tubes per side, emerging from scalloped cutouts in the rear quarter panels. Changes to the production models included the deletion of the overdrive unit, a different instrument panel, and a new combination of leather and vinyl upholstery was featured.

The Italia featured a radio (not yet standard equipment even on Cadillacs), form-fitting bucket seats made from foam rubber of three different densities for maximum comfort covered in red and white leather, featuring reclining backrests made up of two contoured bolsters, one for the shoulders and one for the lower back. The seats were firmer at the lower back than the upper and between the two cushions was air space so "the seats actually 'breathed' through the motion of the passengers." A non-reflecting dash was finished in red, with bright red deep-pile Italian carpet, all contrasting with the "Italian Cream" exterior color. Even red leather seat belts were incorporated as they were just beginning to appear as standard equipment that was pioneered by Nash but attached only to the seats themselves. Flow-through ventilation, usually credited as a General Motors innovation, feeding through a cowl vent (just becoming usual in 1950s U.S. cars), was also incorporated.

The Italia was powered by Hudson's "Twin H" 202 cu in (3.3 L) L-head straight 6, with a higher (8:1) compression and dual one-barrel (single choke) downdraft carburetors, producing 114 hp (85 kW; 116 PS). All were equipped with a three-speed manual transmission with a column-mounted gear shift lever. The cars featured drum brakes in both the front and rear. The trunk was accessible only from inside the vehicle. The area consists of a large luggage platform behind the seats with straps to hold cargo and lockable storage compartments on either side of the platform.

== Production ==
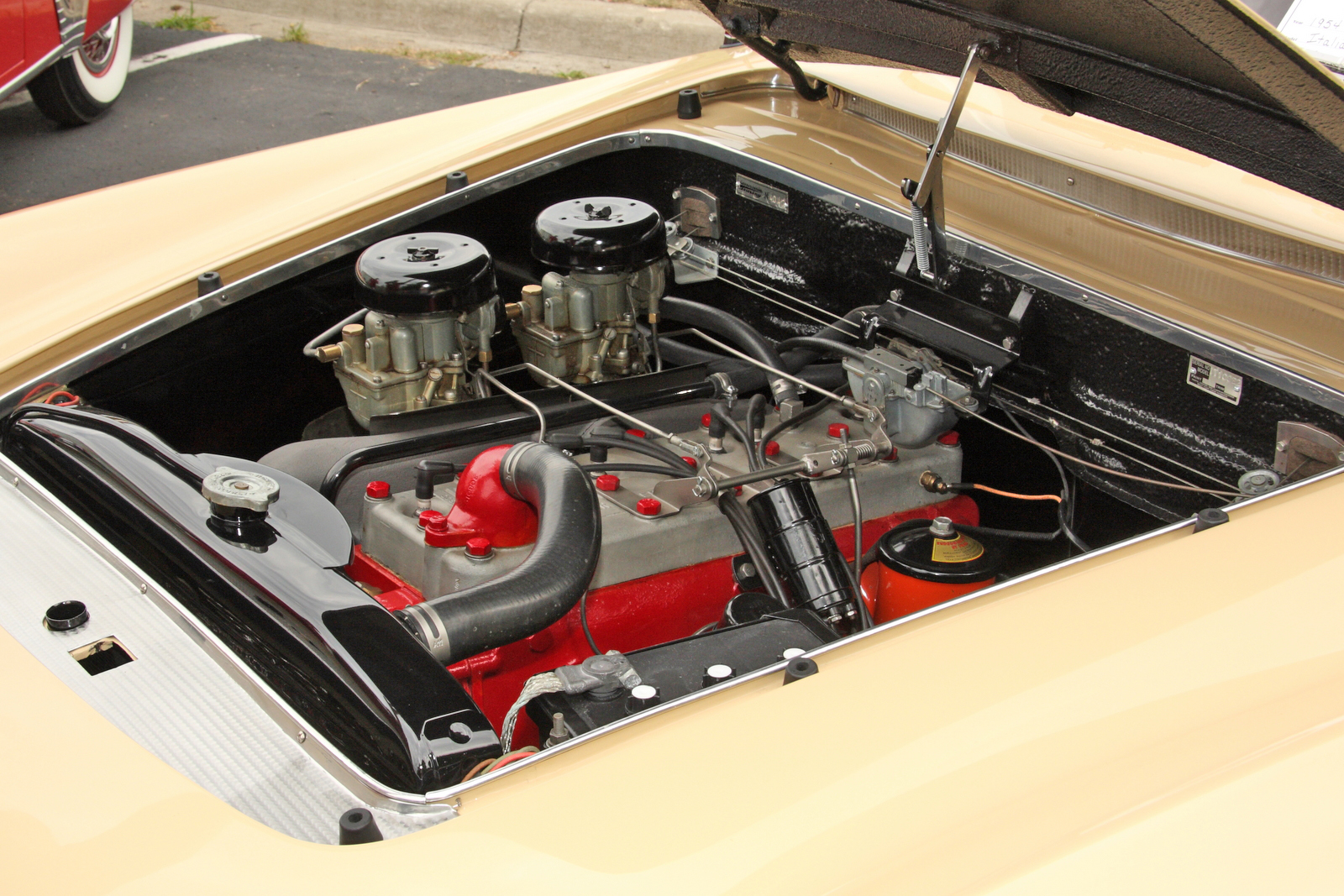
Hudson Italia engine

Hudson commissioned Carrozzeria Touring to build what is believed to have been a total of 50 cars and shipped the needed "Super Jet" components to Italy. Despite lower labor costs in Italy, the hand-built car's price was initially US$4,350 at the New York port of entry (POE) according to an AMC press release (undated). It was $4,800 FOB Detroit, per a letter Hudson sent on 23 September 1953 to dealers and as listed in the Motor Trend October 1954 issue. This was more than the price of a Cadillac at that time (the Sixty-Two Coupe de Ville started at $3,995).

Hudson dealers began taking orders on 23 September 1953. The response was lukewarm, with only 18 or 19 firm orders. The Italia's price was high, and dealers were disappointed that Hudson did not offer the more powerful Hornet engine. Moreover, less expensive were the $4,721 Nash-Healey, the $3,668 Kaiser Darrin, and the $3,523 Chevrolet Corvette.

On 14 January 1954, Hudson Motors and Nash-Kelvinator Corporation announced a merger to form American Motors Corporation (AMC). Hudson's prospects as a stand-alone independent marque ended with complete consolidation under AMC by May 1954. The newly formed automaker sent letters to all Hudson dealers announcing a deadline for pre-paid orders from customers for the cars assembled in Italy. However, "orphan" branded autos such as the Nash and Hudson were shunned by customers and depreciated quickly. Orders for the Italia were almost nonexistent, and AMC committed to having only another 15 Italias built.

The managers of the newly merged automakers at AMC had no intentions to expand marketing for the Italia, and further problems cropped up when Carrozzeria Touring refused to supply spare body and trim parts. Roy D. Chapin Jr. "was the sales manager for the Italia program and was ordered to get rid of those cars."

Most of the Italias were purchased by eccentric customers in Southern California. For example, one of the last cars built, serial #24, was purchased by Trevor James Constable who changed the original I6 and three-speed transmission with column-mounted shifter to a Chevrolet V8 engine and a floor-shifted four-speed manual gearbox. Twenty-one of the 26 Italias have been accounted for and the cars seldom change owners. The "missing" five cars carry serial numbers 5, 6, 8, 9, and 10, with two in this group were located in Europe, thus leading to speculation that these early cars were never delivered to the U.S. Contemporary reports indicated these initial cars were sold in Europe. The car displayed at the 1954 Paris Auto Show was serial number 7. It was in Sweden until 1999 when it was purchased by a collector and brought to California.

== X-161 prototype ==
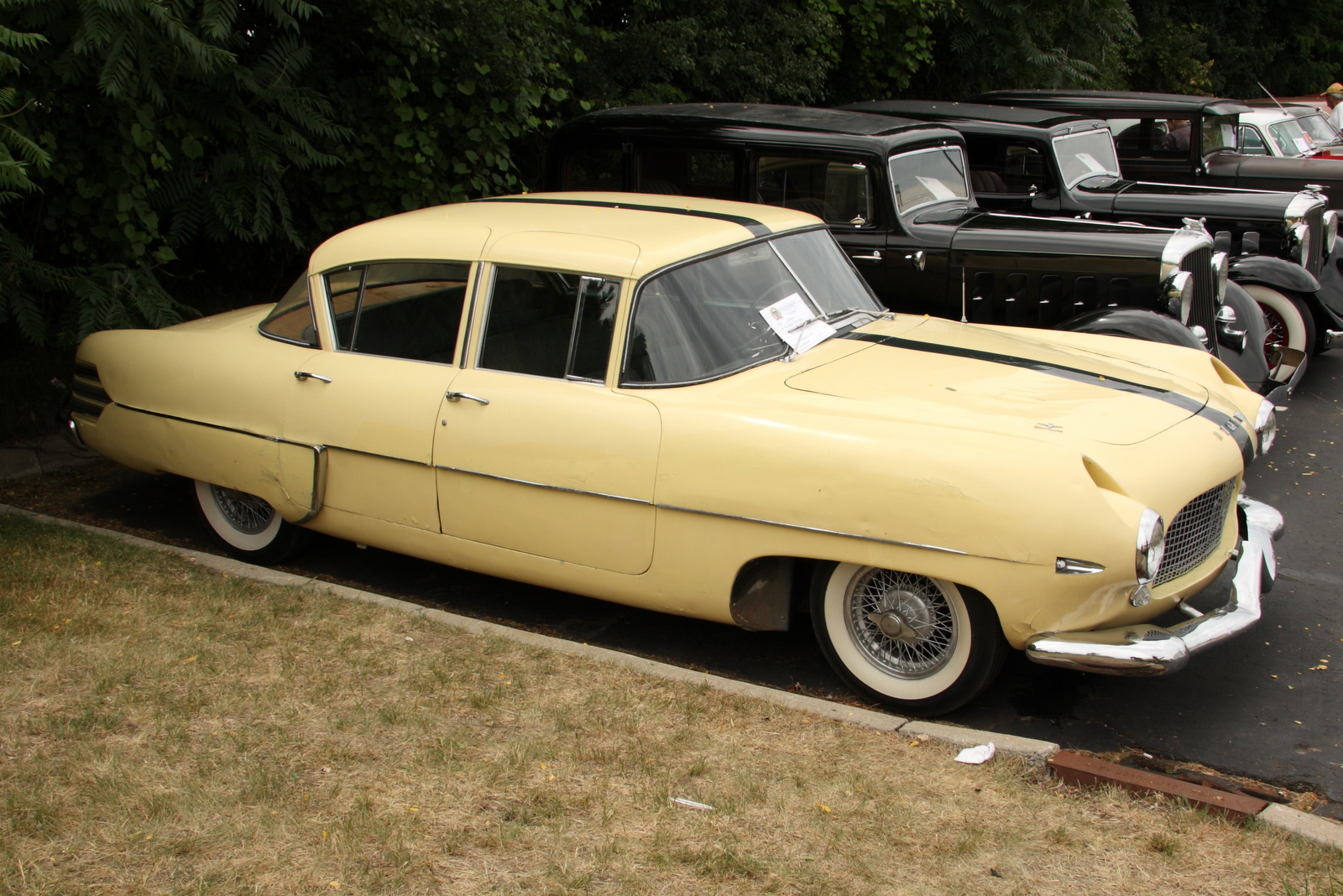
Hudson Italia X-161 prototype

A single four-door sedan prototype (dubbed X-161 for Spring's 161st experimental prototype) powered with the Hornet engine was also constructed. This was a much larger car based not on the compact Jet, but on the full-sized Hornet. It delivered good performance and employed many of the features of the Italia, though its ornamentation was somewhat more subdued. It was also built in Italy by Carrozzeria Touring as a working prototype for Hudson's replacement of its step-down models. The X-161 is also described as the last "real" Hudson.

== Legacy ==
The Hudson Italia gained international recognition, but only 25 of these stylish models were produced, in addition to the single prototype. The automobile was Hudson's "last gasp for an image-building smash hit."

The authors of the book 365 Cars You Must Drive wrote that the decision represented "going for broke" in that it would bring benefits if the car was successful in the marketplace and would help lift sales for the company. In retrospect, the Italia was one of the "disasters" for the automaker, but represented "typical product development in the automobile industry" at the time.

Italia's massive grille design was later adapted on the 1956 Hudson that was introduced after the merger of the two companies.

Automobile collector, Gordon Apker, described the Italia's looks: "It's the 50s; it's Flash Gordon, it's Italian drama on an American platform."

== Collectibility ==
Hudson Italias are invited to numerous prestigious car shows, including Pebble Beach Concours d'Elegance, and regularly earn special awards.

A Hudson Italia with chassis number 11 was formerly part of the Harrah Collection, which was acquired in 1971, reportedly from Liberace, finished in silver with red and black leather upholstery.

The market value of the Hudson Italia is increasing as evidenced by a "no reserve" sale of car number 21 for $396,000 at the 2013 Barrett-Jackson auction in Scottsdale. This car was of such quality that Sports Car Market magazine's analysis was that "the buyer went home with a screaming deal." Other cars on the market in 2009 and 2012 have also resulted in sales above $250,000. A Hudson Italia with serial number 003 that underwent a ground-up concours level restoration that took from September 2009 to December 2010, was a class award winner at Pebble Beach in 2011, was priced at $500,000 in 2013.

A Hudson Italia that was recognized as the "Best Preserved Post-War Car" at the 2014 Concorso d'Eleganza Villa d'Este was priced at €575,000.

An opinion in 2014 described that the Italia's unique style and limited production have made the unique car "a valuable asset at any car show" and that it "will likely soon be an "A" list collector car."

Hudson used the first production, Italia (serial IT-10001), as a show car across the United States and Canada. The restored car features the correct cream with a red and white interior. It has had only three owners until 2023 when it was purchased for $495,000.

== Sources ==
- Conde, John A. (1987). The American Motors Family Album. American Motors Corporation. OCLC 3185581.
- Gunnell, John, ed. (1987). The Standard Catalog of American Cars 1946-1975. Krause. ISBN 9780873410960.
