= Alfa Romeo Disco Volante =

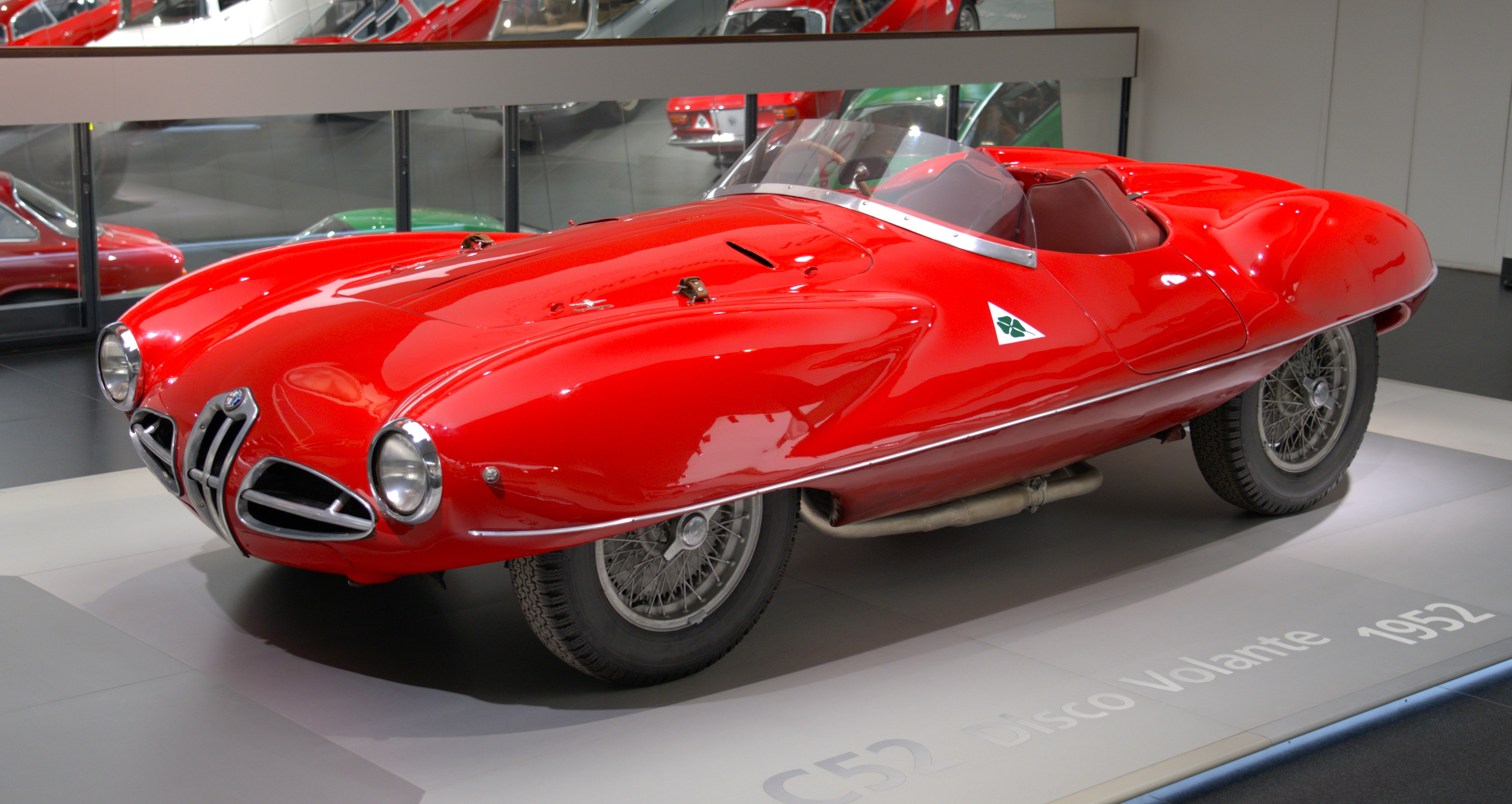
- Alfa Romeo 1900 C52 Disco Volante in the Alfa Romeo Museum

Overview
- Manufacturer: Alfa Romeo
- Also called: Alfa Romeo 1900 C 52
- Production: 1952–1953
- Designer: Carrozzeria Touring

Body and chassis
- Class: Experimental racing car
- Body style: 2-door spider 2-door coupé
- Layout: Front-engine, rear-wheel-drive
- Doors: Swan

Powertrain
- Engine: 1,997 cc I4; 3,495 cc I6
- Transmission: 4-speed manual

Dimensions
- Wheelbase: 2,220 mm (87.4 in)
- Kerb weight: 2.0-litre: 735 kg (1,620 lb); 3.5-litre: 760 kg (1,676 lb)

The Alfa Romeo 1900 C52 "Disco Volante" ('flying saucer') is a series of experimental sports racing cars produced between 1952 and 1953 by Italian car manufacturer Alfa Romeo in collaboration with Milanese coachbuilder Carrozzeria Touring. The car was distinguished by streamlined, wind tunnel tested bodywork.

Three spiders were made in 1952, with a 2-litre all-alloy four-cylinder engine; a year later one was modified into a coupé, and another one into a more conventional-looking spider. Two more examples were built fitted with a six-cylinder 3.5-litre engine from the Alfa Romeo 6C 3000 CM racing car. Four of the five cars built in total survive today.

== History ==
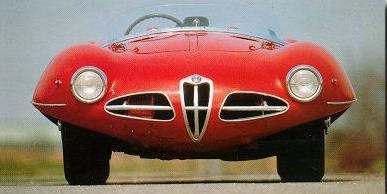
Front view of the 1952 Disco Volante Spider, highlighting the lenticular cross-section of the body.

The 1900 C52 was originally developed in 1952 to take part to Sport category races. Its fully enveloping aerodynamic bodywork was developed and built together with Carrozzeria Touring, and wind tunnel tested. Studied to achieve a low drag coefficient even in crosswinds, the body featured a lenticular cross-section both viewed from the front and from the side; the underbody was faired-in. According to some authors and experts of automotive history, the designs of the Jaguar D-Type (1954–1957) and Jaguar E-Type (1961–1974) were inspired by the Disco Volante spider and coupé (1952–1953).

Built around an all-new tubular space frame, the Disco Volante used lightened components from the Alfa Romeo 1900. As on the 1900, the engine was an inline-four with double chain-driven overhead camshafts, but used an aluminium block and inserted sleeves instead of the 1900s cast iron one. While the 1900s 88 mm stroke was retained, cylinder bore had grown from 82.55 mm to 85 mm, bringing total displacement to 1,997.4 cubic centimetres; compression ratio was raised to 8.73:1. So configured, fed by two twin-choke sidedraught carburettors, the engine produced 158 PS (116 kW; 156 hp) at 6,500 rpm. The transmission was 4-speed gearbox with synchronised forwards speeds and a multi plate dry clutch. Suspension was, as on other Alfa Romeos of the time, by double wishbones at the front and solid axle linked to the chassis by an upper triangle and two lower longitudinal reaction arms. The brakes were drums on all four corners, and the 6.0×16" tyres were fitted to wire wheels with duralumin rims. Thanks to its aerodynamic shape the car could attain a top speed of 220 kilometres per hour (140 mph).

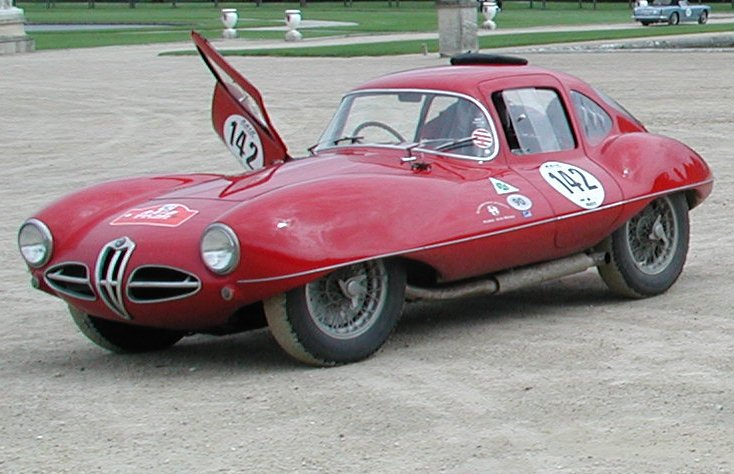
Alfa Romeo C52 Disco Volante Coupé

Three examples of the two-litre Disco Volante were built in total. In 1953 two of them were modified to carry out further aerodynamic tests. One was given a fixed roof, becoming an enclosed coupé; the other, doing away with the characteristic bulging wings in favour of more conventional ones, became the so-called "fianchi stretti" (Italian for "narrow hips") spider. The latter car was the only Disco Volante to be raced in period—being fielded in some competitions during 1953—since the program did not progress past the experimental stage.

Two more cars with the original spider body style were built fitted with a 3,495 cc, cast iron block, double overhead camshaft straight-six engine from the contemporary Alfa Romeo 6C 3000 CM racing car in place of the all-alloy four-cylinder; one was dismantled soon after its construction. Thanks to an output of 230 PS (169 kW; 227 hp) at 6,000 rpm, the 3.5-litre Disco Volante could reach a top speed of 240 km/h (149 mph).

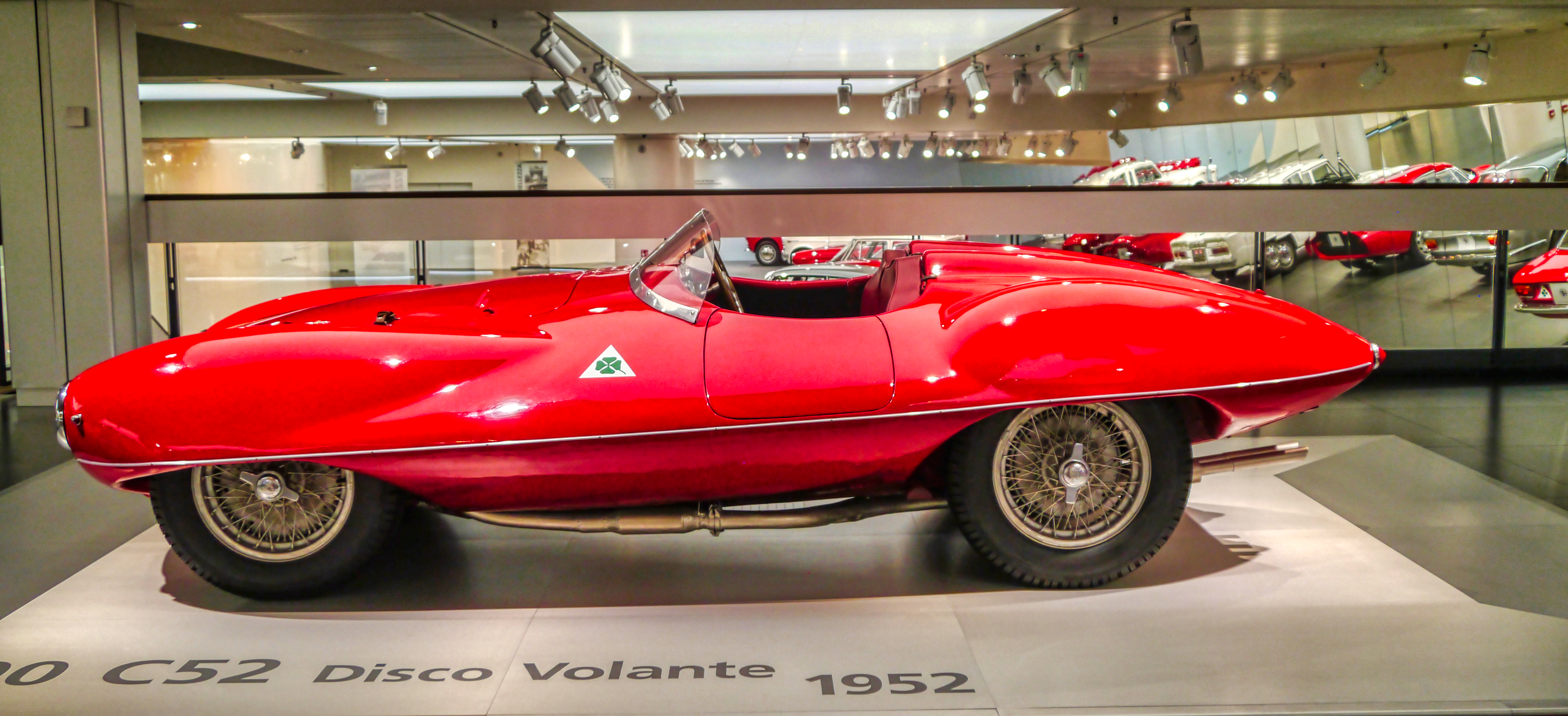
Alfa Romeo C52 Disco Volante Spider

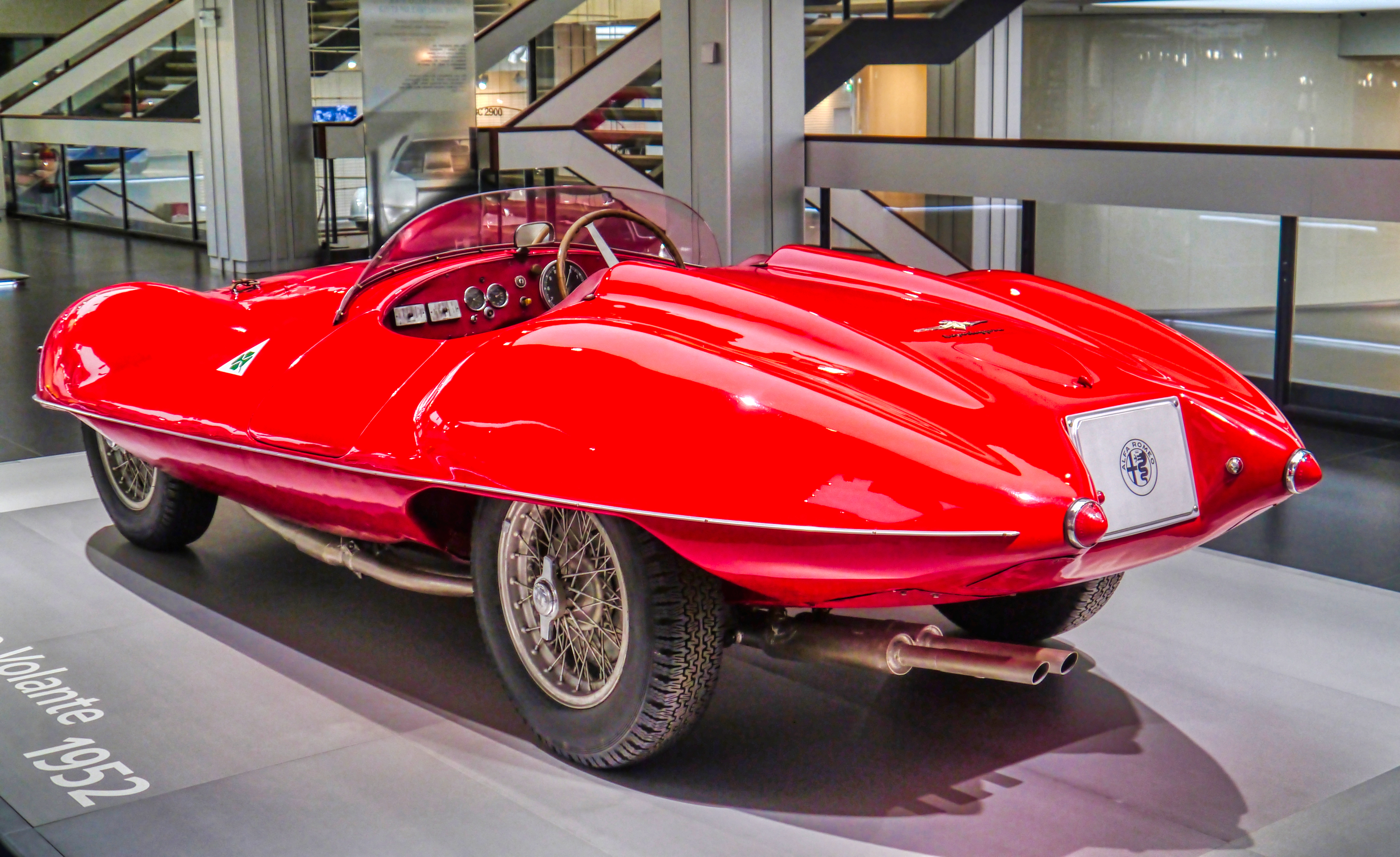
Alfa Romeo C52 Disco Volante Spider

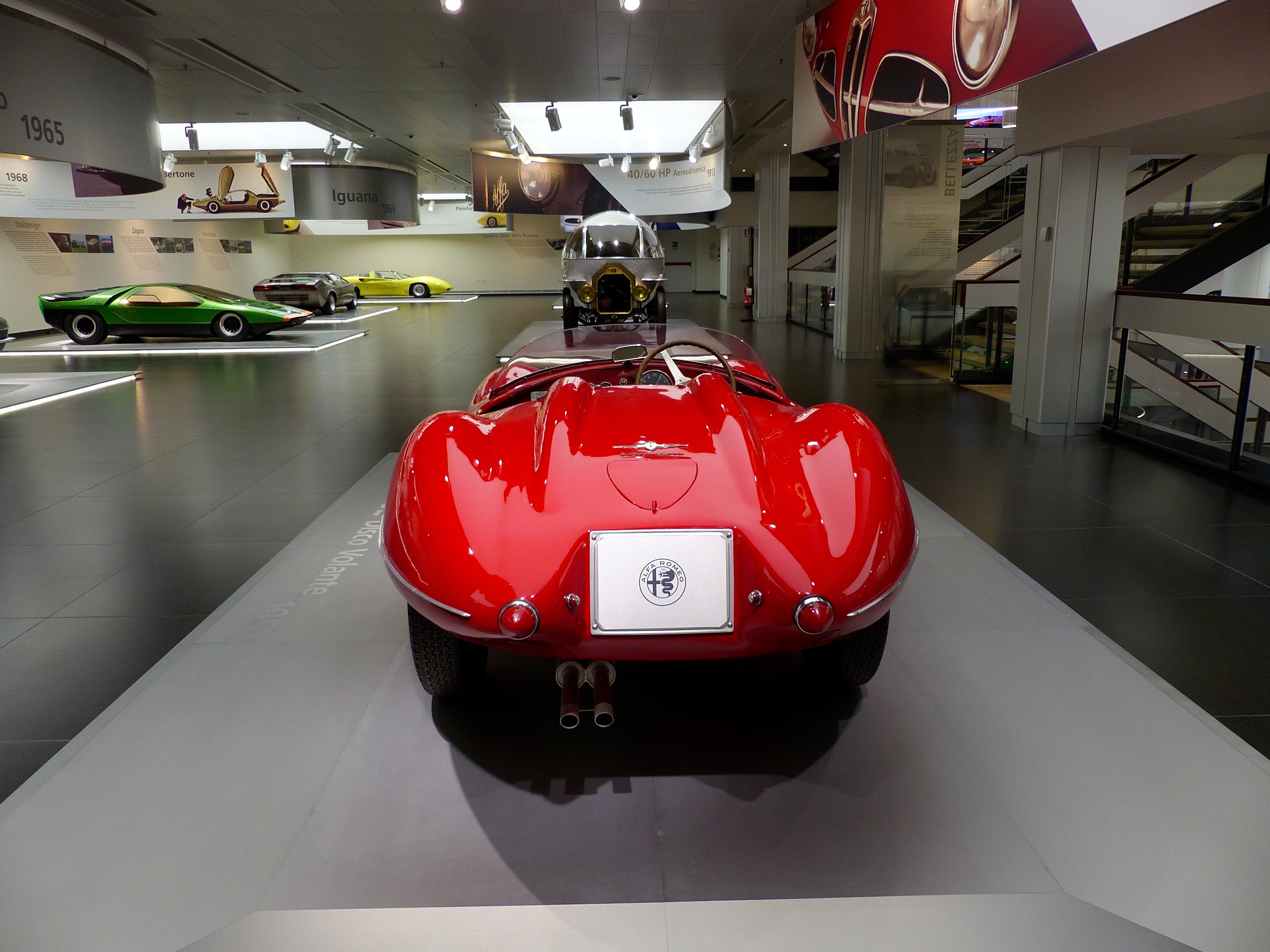
Alfa Romeo C52 Disco Volante Spider

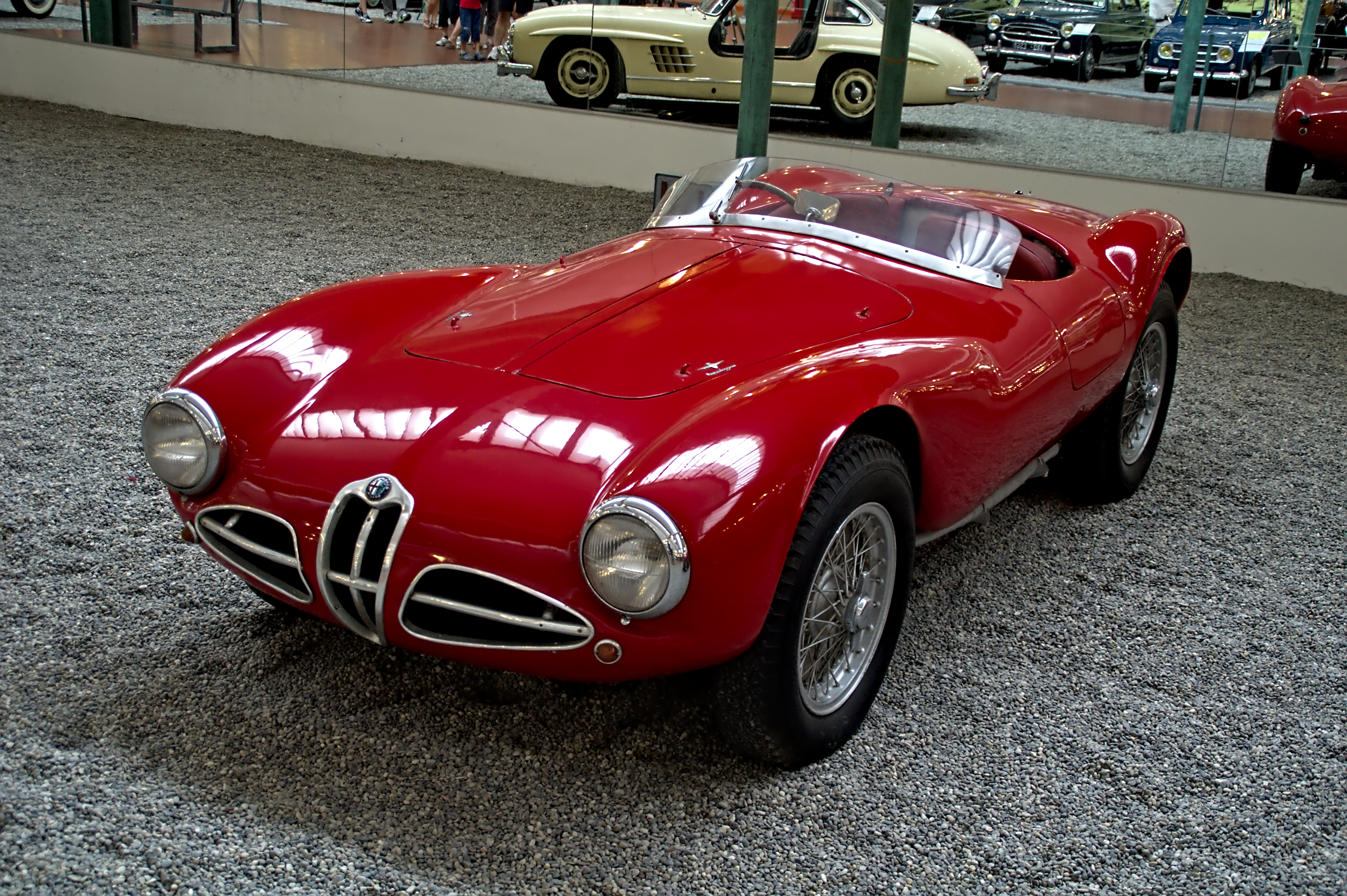
Alfa Romeo C52 Fianchi Stretti Spider

=== The Disco Volante today ===
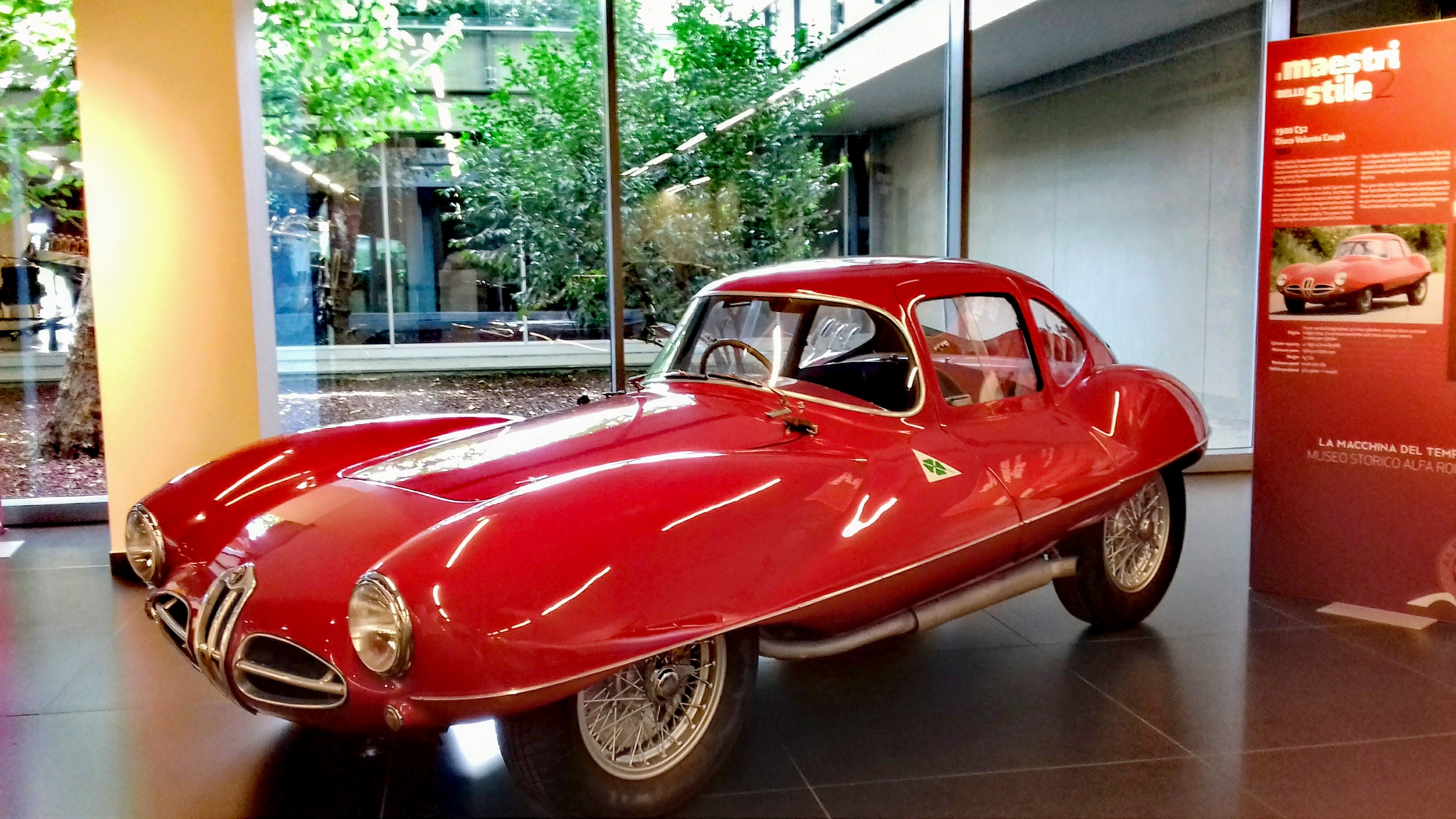
Alfa Romeo C52 Disco Volante Coupé in the Alfa Romeo Museum

The spider and coupé 2.0-litre prototypes are preserved in the Alfa Romeo Museum in Arese, and are regularly used in classic car races. Estimated value of each is between 1 and 2 million Euro. The fianchi stretti spider is part of the Schlumpf collection, on display in the Musée national de l’automobile in Mulhouse, France. Finally, the unique remaining six-cylinder 3.5-litre spider is preserved in the Museo Nazionale dell'Automobile in Turin.

A bronze sculpture inspired by the Disco Volante was revealed in the Fiera Milano for the 100 Years of Alfa Romeo in Summer 2010. A limited-edition scale model of the sculpture was also released for the event.

=== Alfa Romeo Disco Volante by Touring ===
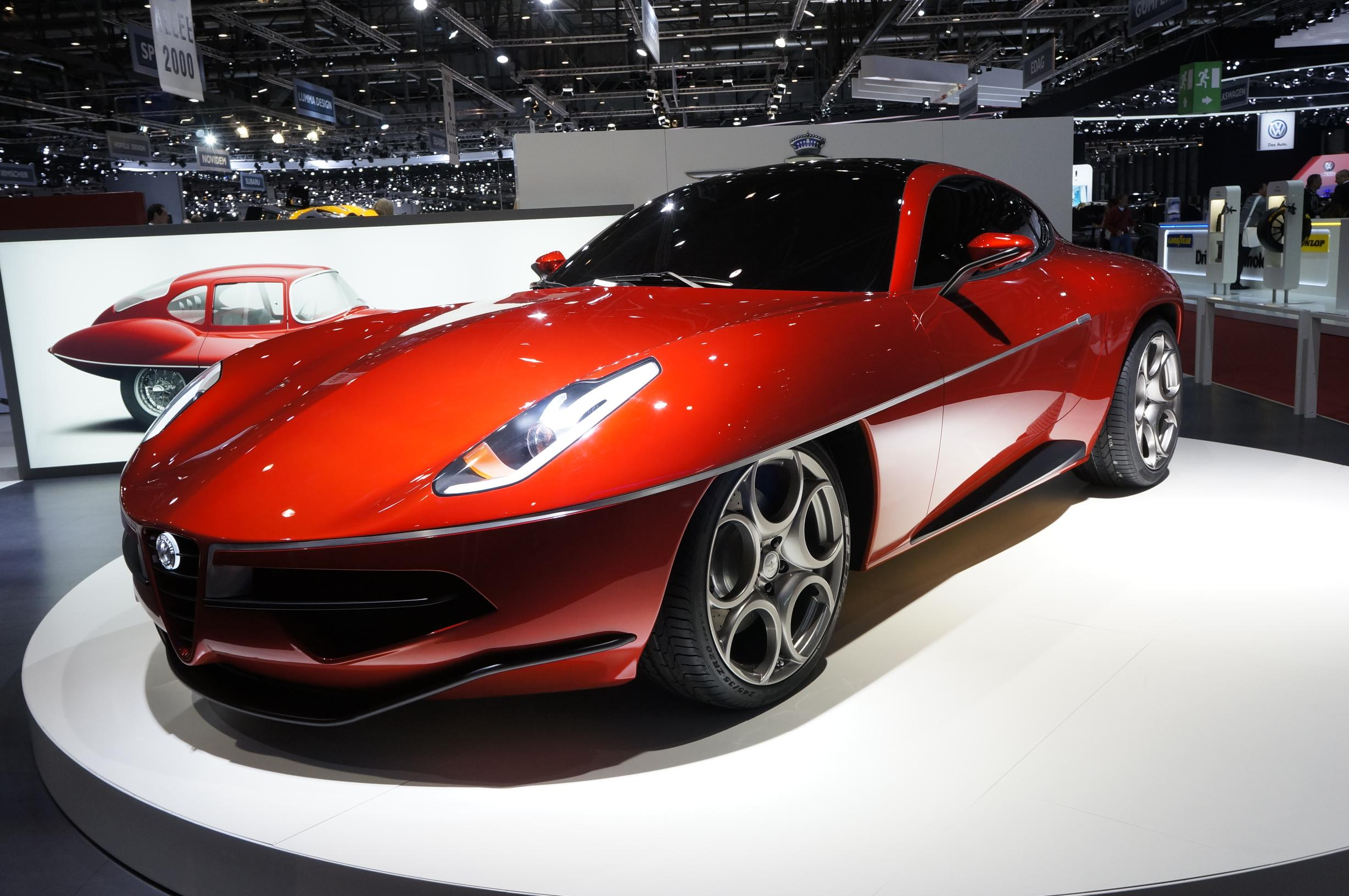
Front view of the 2012 Disco Volante at the Geneva Motor Show

The Alfa Romeo Disco Volante by Touring is a two-seater coupé with front-central engine and transaxle drivetrain. The Alfa Romeo 8C Competizione supplied the rolling chassis along with the drivetrain and electronic systems. The car was showcased at the 2012 Geneva Motor Show as a full scale style model. Touring offers this as a very limited series for discerning customers: collectors, sporting drivers and design aficionados. It is inspired by the Touring designed Alfa Romeo C52 of 1952.
