= Alfa Romeo Disco Volante by Touring =

Alfa Romeo Disco Volante Alfa Romeo Disco Volante Spyder
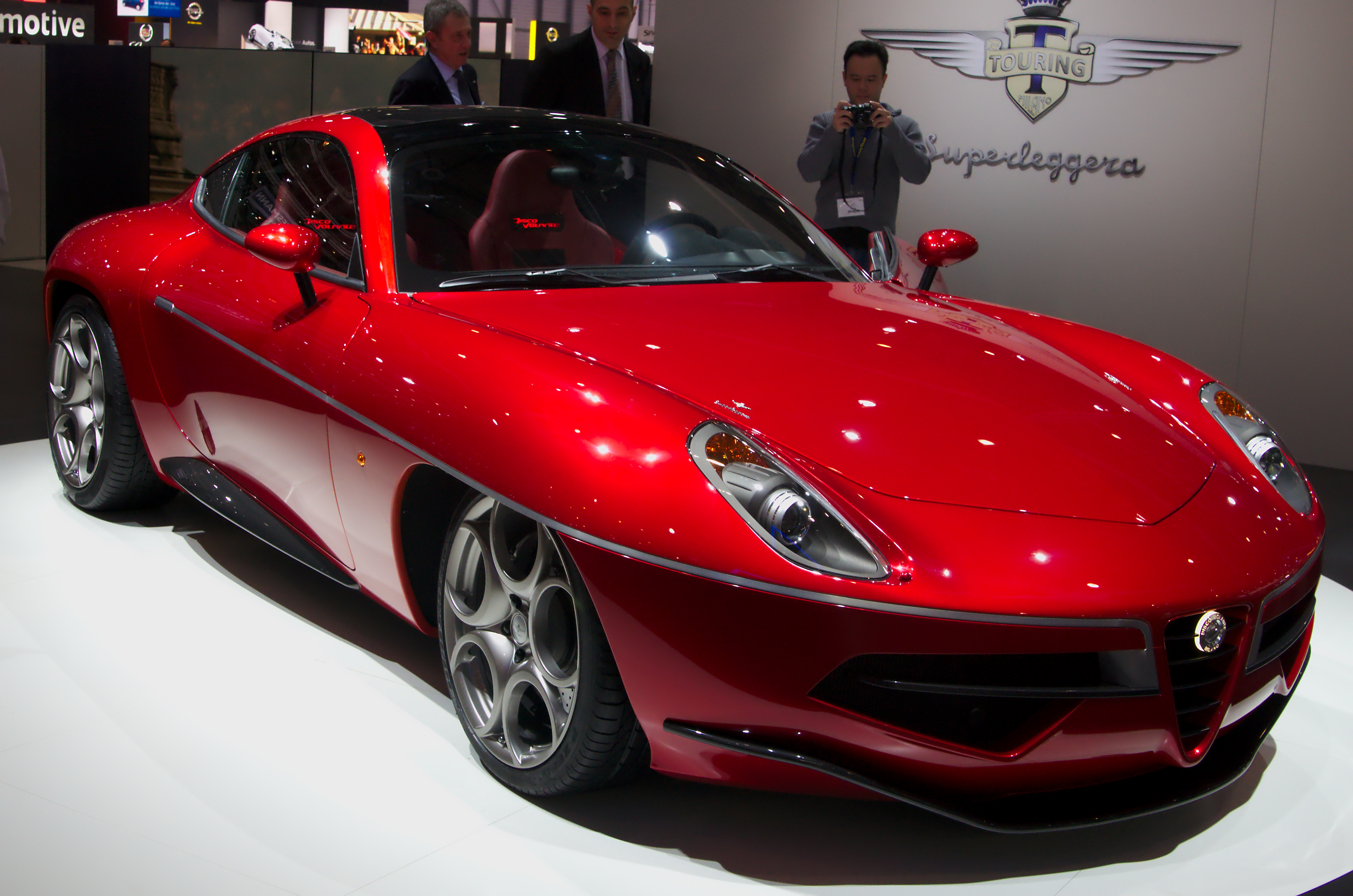

Overview
- Manufacturer: Carrozzeria Touring
- Production: 2013
- Designer: Louis de Fabribeckers at Carrozzeria Touring

Body and chassis
- Body style: 2-door coupé 2-door spider
- Layout: Front mid-engine, rear-wheel-drive
- Related: Alfa Romeo 8C Competizione; Alfa Romeo 8C Spider

Powertrain
- Engine: 4.7 L F136 YC V8
- Transmission: 6-speed automated manual transmission

Dimensions
- Wheelbase: 2,640 mm (103.9 in)
- Length: 4,610 mm (181.5 in)
- Width: 2,032 mm (80.0 in)
- Height: 1,309 mm (51.5 in)

The Alfa Romeo Disco Volante by Touring is a two-seater coupé, built by Carrozzeria Touring in 2013. It is based on the Alfa Romeo 8C Competizione.

== Specifications ==
The model name and styling is derived from the Disco Volante of the 1950s. The body is made primarily from hand-beaten aluminum panels.

Mechanically, the Disco Volante is largely identical to the 8C, except for a new exhaust system and some suspension tweaks. Like the 8C, it's powered by a 4.7 L front-mid mounted V8 engine producing 450 PS (331 kW; 444 hp) and 480 N⋅m (354 lbf⋅ft) of torque. The Disco Volante is rear-wheel-drive with a six-speed automated manual gearbox. The transmission is a transaxle with limited-slip differential, while the suspension is independent quadrilateral and made of aluminium.

The car is able to accelerate from 0 to 100 km/h (62 mph) in 4.2 seconds and can reach an estimated top speed of 292 km/h (181 mph).

Reportedly, between eight and ten examples were built.

== Spyder ==
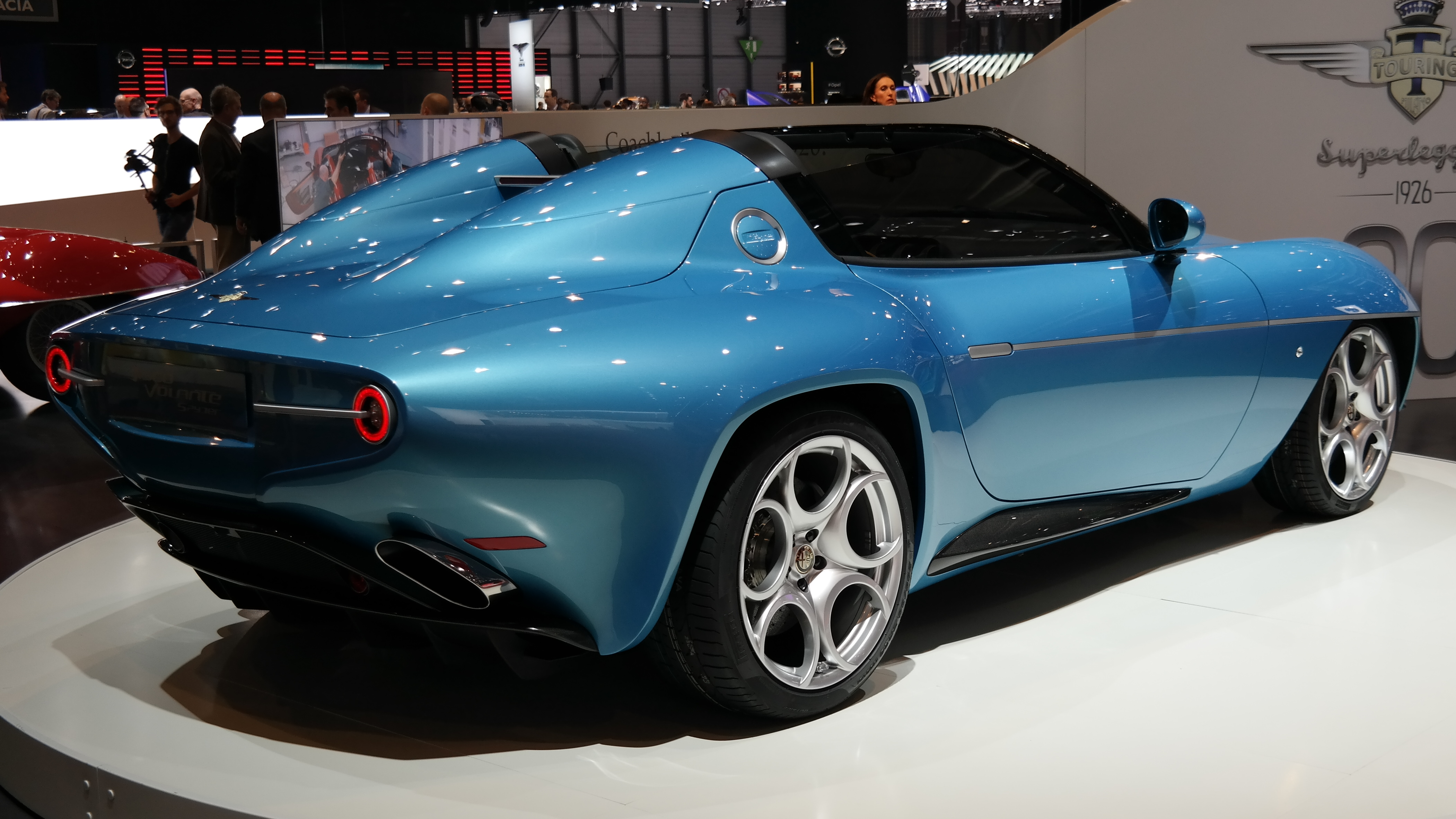
Alfa Romeo Disco Volante Spyder

A Spyder version of Disco Volante was presented at the Geneva Motor Show in March 2016. A limited series of seven cars was manufactured, based on the Alfa Romeo 8C Spider chassis. Touring replaced the 8C Spider's folding fabric roof with two removable carbon-fiber roof panels, which can be stowed in the trunk.
