= Southern Union Gas Company Building =

Historic place in New Mexico, US

- U.S. National Register of Historic Places
- NM State Register of Cultural Properties
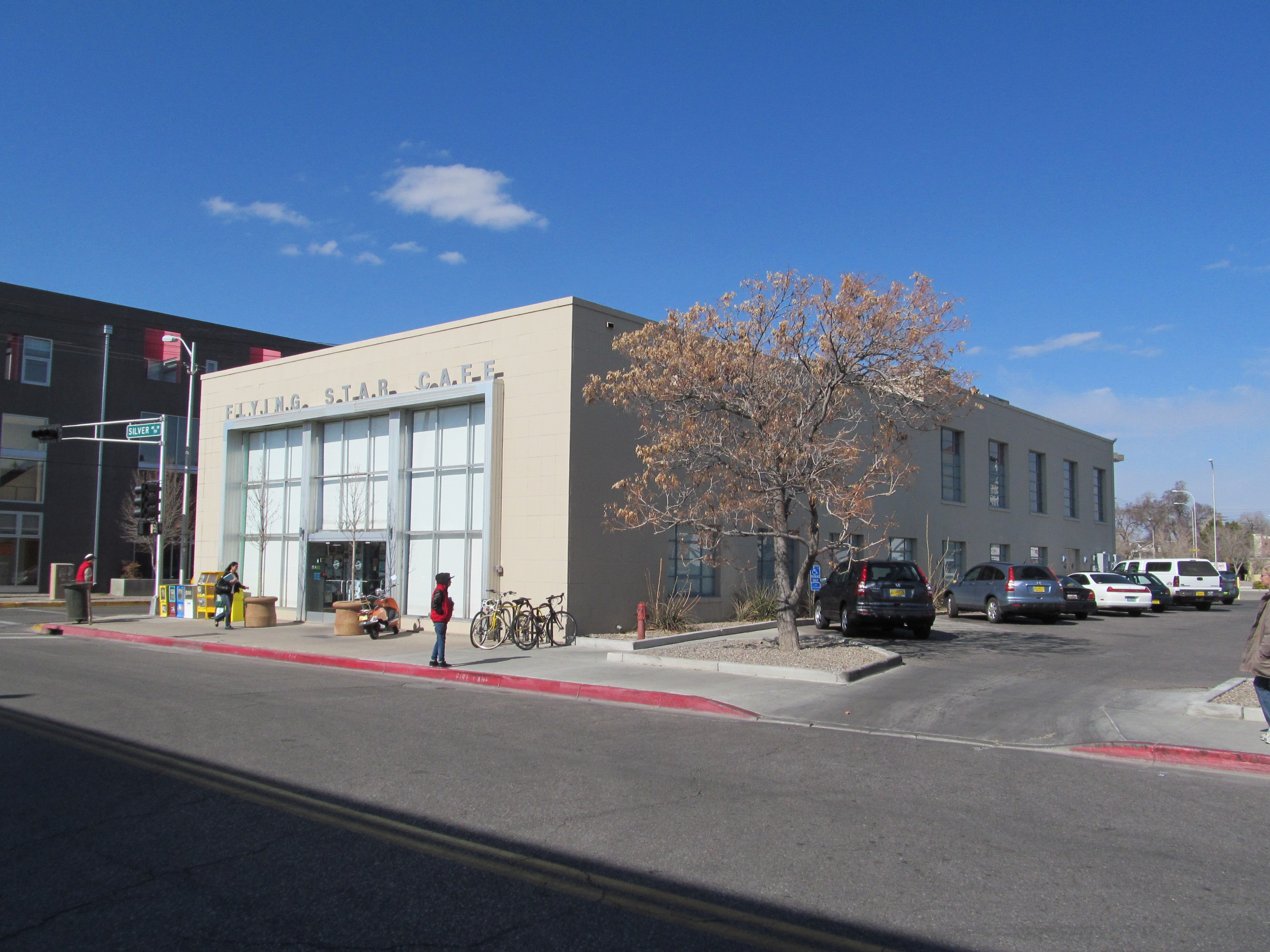
- Southern Union Gas Company Building
- Location: 723 Silver Ave. SW, Albuquerque, New Mexico
- Coordinates: 35°5′0″N 106°39′24″W
- Built: 1951
- Architect: John Gaw Meem
- NRHP reference No.: 04000252
- NMSRCP No.: 1853

Significant dates
- Added to NRHP: March 31, 2004
- Designated NMSRCP: August 8, 2003

The Southern Union Gas Company Building is a historic building in downtown Albuquerque, New Mexico, which is notable as one of the earliest International style buildings in the city. Built in 1951, it was the largest of several Southern Union offices around the state designed by southwestern architect John Gaw Meem. Meem was much better known for working in the Pueblo Revival style but did design a handful of other modernist buildings, such as the Colorado Springs Fine Arts Center.

Meem completed the design for the Southern Union building in 1949, intending to "project the image of a progressive, public-spirited company". The building has two stories, with the former appliance showroom on the ground floor and a multipurpose "hospitality room" upstairs. The main showroom space is 17 feet (5.2 m) high, with a sweeping staircase to the upper level and expansive plate-glass windows on the south and west sides.

The Southern Union Building was added to the New Mexico State Register of Cultural Properties in 2003 and the National Register of Historic Places in 2004. In 2004–5, the then-vacant building was renovated and converted into a Flying Star restaurant at a cost of $3.5 million. The Flying Star location closed in October 2015 as part of the chain's bankruptcy proceedings. Just two months later, it was announced that the building would house the Albuquerque offices of Rural Sourcing, Inc., an Atlanta-based tech company. The building was renovated a second time in order to convert the restaurant space to offices, costing over $1 million.
