= Flying Star (restaurant) =

American restaurant chain

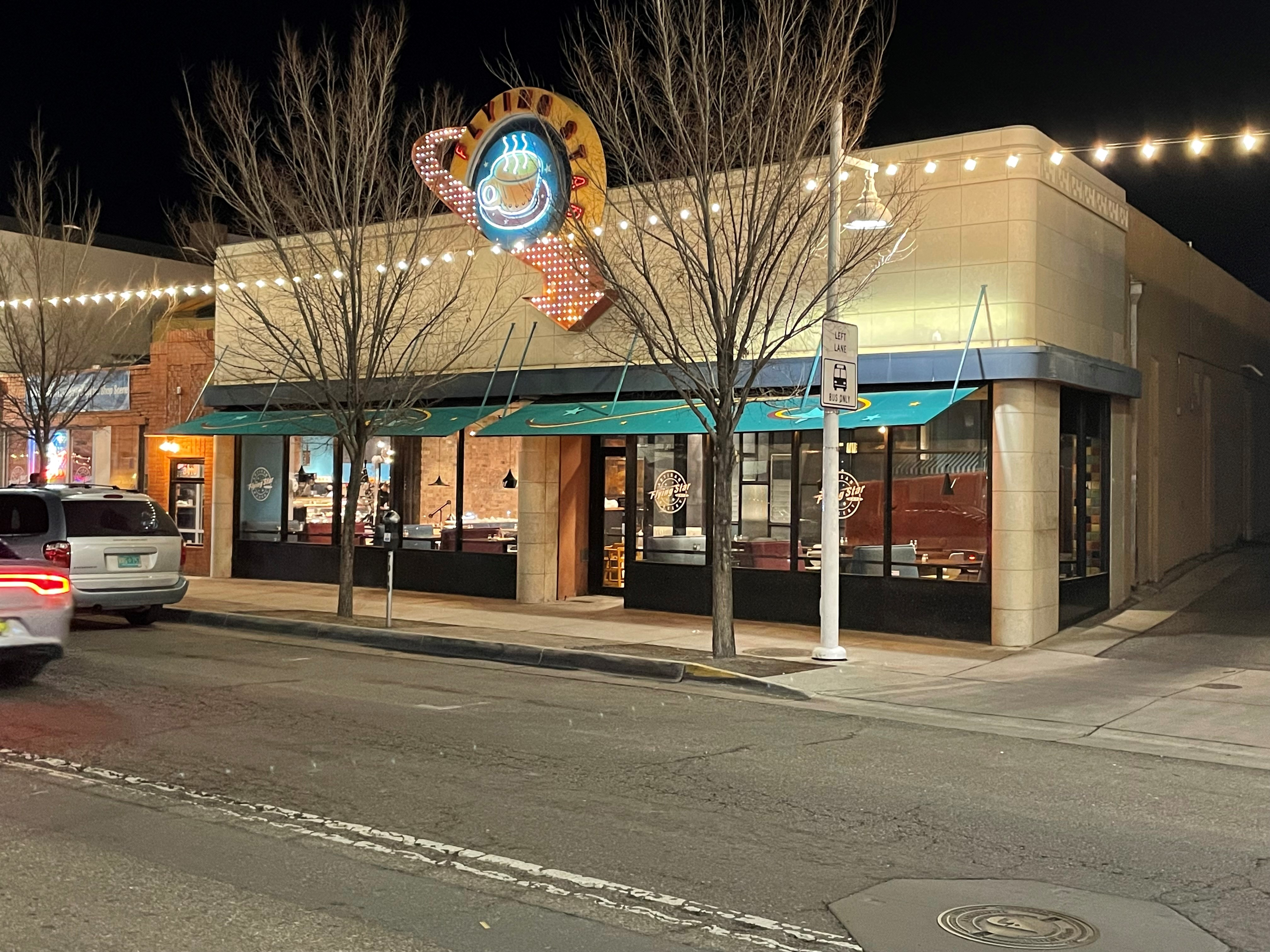
- Flying Star Cafe's Nob Hill location in January 2024.
- Company type: Private
- Industry: Restaurant
- Founded: August 1987; 38 years ago Albuquerque, New Mexico, US
- Headquarters: Albuquerque, New Mexico, New Mexico
- Number of locations: 6 (October 2015)
- Area served: United States
- Products: Cakes, coffee drinks, ice creams & other dinner items
- Website: www.flyingstarcafe.com

Flying Star Cafe is a privately owned and operated cafe restaurant chain in Albuquerque, New Mexico, US.

== History ==
Flying Star Cafe's first location was opened in 1987 on Central Avenue in the Nob Hill area of Albuquerque, near the University of New Mexico campus. At the time it was named Double Rainbow, as it was a franchisee of the San Francisco ice cream chain of the same name. The two businesses entered into an agreement regarding the common use of the name, but eventually the Albuquerque location wanted to branch out into food restaurants and the agreement was revisited; as a result, Double Rainbow in Albuquerque changed their name to Flying Star Cafe. When looking for a name, they went over 300 different choices, and ultimately the name Flying Star came from a Chinese Firecracker Magazine.

As Double Rainbow, they opened up two more locations. One is located in the Northeast Heights of Albuquerque on Juan Tabo Boulevard, opening in 1995. The third location, opened in 2000, is located near the Uptown area of Albuquerque, on Menaul Boulevard. The name change from Double Rainbow to Flying Star occurred when the fourth location opened in 2001, in the North Rio Grande Valley. This location features a horse hitching post, allowing customers to visit Flying Star on horseback. This location also has a large Petio — an outdoor area where patrons can eat alongside their pets. The fifth location opened in 2005, in the Downtown Albuquerque area. This building now offered yet another new feature — a conference room for downtown business lunches. In 2006, another location opened in Corrales, and in 2007, another Northeast Heights location opened off of Paseo del Norte. In 2008, Flying Star expanded outside the city limits, opening their first location in Bernalillo. The following year, Flying Star opened yet another store in the Railyard district of Santa Fe, New Mexico.

Since 1987, Flying Star has now expanded to seven locations in Albuquerque, with four more locations in Bernalillo, Corrales, and Santa Fe. The Downtown Albuquerque location is housed in the former Southern Union Gas Company Building, which is listed on the National Register of Historic Places.

Satellite Coffee, a popular café chain in Albuquerque, is the sister company of Flying Star Cafe. Flying Star Cafe locations serve Satellite coffee.

== Locations ==
Location Name:	Opened:	Closed:
Flying Star Cafe Nob Hill	1987 (as Double Rainbow)	
Flying Star Cafe Juan Tabo	1995 (as Double Rainbow)	
Flying Star Cafe Menaul	2000 (as Double Rainbow)	
Flying Star Cafe Rio Grande	2001	
Flying Star Cafe Downtown	2005	October 23, 2015
Flying Star Cafe Corrales	2006	
Flying Star Cafe Paseo del Norte	2007	
Flying Star Cafe Bernalillo	2008	January 30, 2015
Flying Star Cafe Santa Fe Railyard	2009	January 30, 2015
