= Carrozzeria Touring Superleggera =

Italian automobile coachbuilder

Coordinates: 45.542819°N .0686401°E

Carrozzeria Touring Superleggera S.r.l.
- Type: Private
- Industry: Automotive
- Founded: 1926; Milan, Italy
- Founder: Felice Bianchi Anderloni; Gaetano Ponzoni
- Headquarters: Milan, Italy
- Area served: Worldwide
- Key people: Markus Tellenbach, CEO; Matteo Gentile, Head of Design
- Products: Sports cars
- Services: Automotive design, coachbuilding, engineering, homologation, non-automotive industrial design, restoration of classic cars, custom coachbuilding, restoration services, limited-edition sports cars
- Subsidiaries: Bruino (TO) Rivalta (TO)
- Website: touringsuperleggera.eu

Original Carrozzeria Touring badge

Later badge design, until 1966

Carrozzeria Touring Superleggera is an Italian car coachbuilder. Originally established in Milan in 1925, Carrozzeria Touring became well known for both the beauty of its designs and patented superleggera construction methods. The business folded in 1966. In 2006 its brands and trademarks were purchased and a new firm was established nearby to provide automotive design, engineering, coachbuilding, homologation services, non-automotive industrial design, and restoration of historic vehicles.

Carrozzeria Touring was established on 25 March 1926 by Felice Bianchi Anderloni (1882–1948) and Gaetano Ponzoni. After achieving success through the middle of the 20th century, the business began to decline as automobile manufacturers replaced body-on-frame automobile construction with unitary design and increasingly took coachbuilding in-house.

After the original firm ceased production in 1966, Carlo Felice Bianchi Anderloni and Carrozzeria Marazzi preserved the "Touring Superleggera" trademark and used it on several occasions to support the company's heritage. The trademark was acquired by the current owner, a family business, which began conducting its activities in 2006 under the name Carrozzeria Touring Superleggera S.r.l.; the new firm is headquartered nearby Milan, its hometown.

== History ==
=== Carrozzeria Falco becomes Carrozzeria Touring ===
Carrozzeria Touring traces its roots to the 1926 purchase of a controlling interest in the Milan-based coachbuilder, Carrozzeria Falco, by Milanese lawyers Felice Bianchi Anderloni (1882–1948) and Gaetano Ponzoni from Carrozzeria Falco's founder, Vittorio Ascari. The new owners changed the name of the firm to Carrozzeria Touring. Bianchi Anderloni, a former test driver for Isotta Fraschini and Peugeot Italia employee, assumed styling and engineering duties while Ponzoni assumed responsibility for administration of the firms business activities.

=== Early work ===
Carrozzeria Touring's location at Via Ludovico da Breme 65 placed the coachbuilder near automobile manufacturers Alfa Romeo, Citroën and Isotta Fraschini. Predictably, Touring's first bodywork assignments were for chassis produced by these companies.

=== Development of the Superleggera construction system ===
Bianchi Anderloni came to Touring more as an automobile designer than a car constructor, and learned the mechanics of the trade as the company progressed. The company licensed Charles Weymann's system of fabric-covered lightweight frames, a predecessor of their own Superleggera construction system. Touring hired Giuseppe Seregni, who previously collaborated with Bianchi Anderloni on the 1927 Isotta Fraschini 'Flying Star', as Carrozzeria Touring's first professional designer.

Touring's skills with light alloy and fabric-covered tubing forms brought commercial success in aircraft production in the 1930s, leading Bianchi Anderloni to develop the Superleggera construction system, patented in 1936. This "super lightweight" system consists of a structure of small diameter tubes to form the body's shape with thin alloy panels attached to cover and strengthen the framework. Additionally the system offered great versatility, allowing Touring to quickly construct innovative body shapes.

In 1937, at Mille Miglia, Alfa Romeo 6C 2300B was the first appearance of a Touring car built with the Superleggera system.

Prior to World War II, Touring gained fame for their Superleggera bodies, particularly those made for the Alfa Romeo 8C 2900 and the BMW 328 chassis.

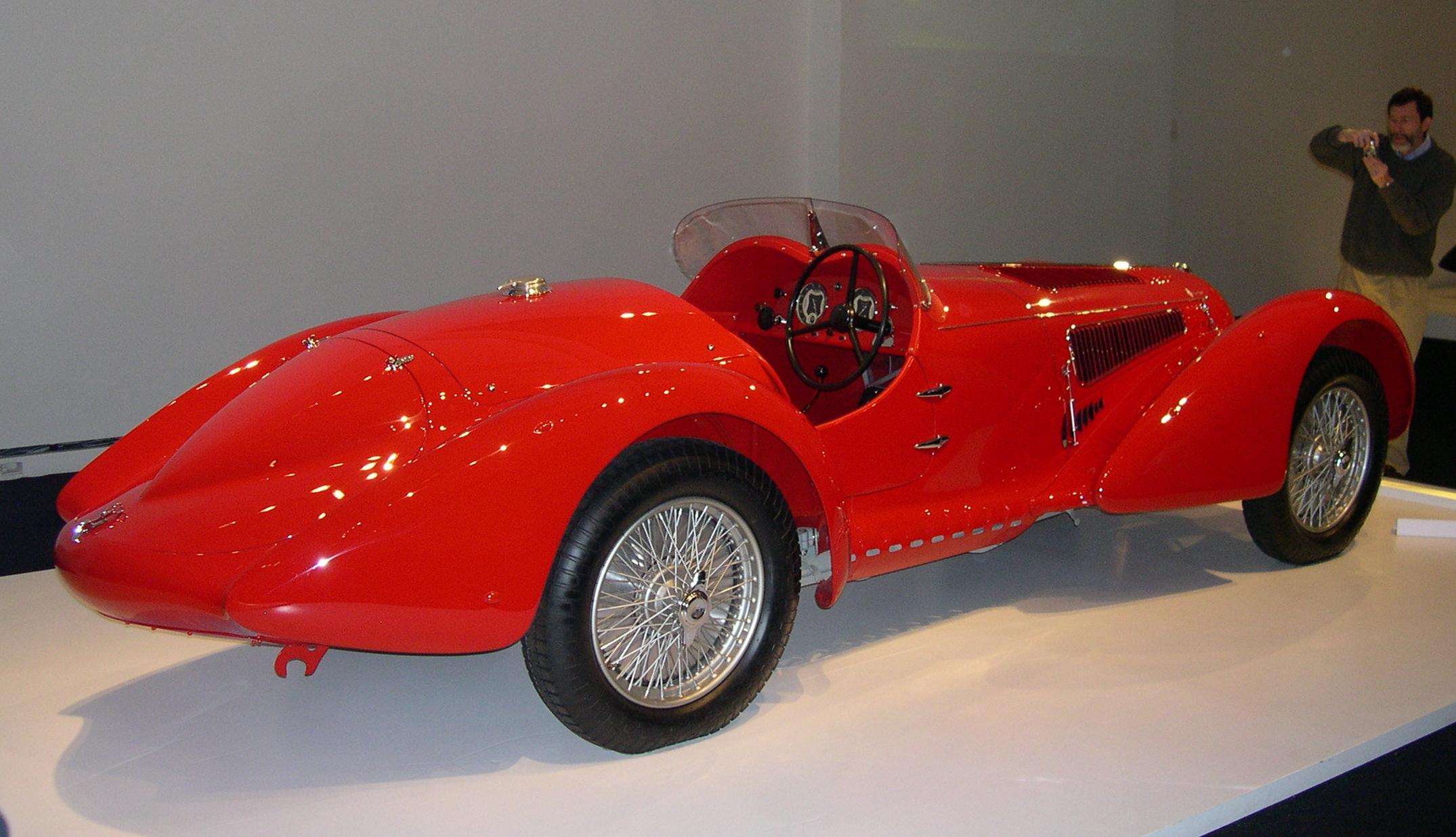
1938 Alfa Romeo 8C 2900 Mille Miglia from the Ralph Lauren collection

Touring-bodied Alfa Romeo 6C2300B

BMW 328 Touring Coupé

=== Post WWII activities ===
The company quickly re-energized after the war, with the Superleggera system widely licensed and copied. Felice Bianchi Anderloni died in 1948 and his son, Carlo Felice "Cici" Bianchi Anderloni, (1916–2003) took over management of the firm under the guidance of Ponzoni. The two would remain in charge of the firm until the company discontinued production in 1966. Chief designer at that time was Federico Formenti.

Formenti's first major project was to create a body for the Ferrari 166 MM Touring barchetta, which debuted in 1948. Automotive design critic Robert Cumberford has referred to the body design for the 166 as "One of the most charismatic shapes ever." The egg-crate grille of the 166 became a signature Ferrari design element and is still in use by Ferrari today.

Touring was particularly active late in the late 50s, with design and body production for the Pegaso Z-102, Alfa Romeo 1900 Super Sprint, Alfa Romeo 2600, Aston Martin DB4, Lancia Flaminia GT, Lamborghini 350, Lamborghini 400 GT and Maserati 3500 GT.

The Aston Martin DB4, the DB5 (famously driven by fictional character James Bond) and the DB6 were named after David Brown's initials. He entrusted Touring Superleggera to design their next generation GT after the introduction of the successful DB2. The license agreement enabled Aston Martin to use the design and the Superleggera construction method at Newton Pagnell plant against a licence fee of £9 for each of the first 500 bodies and £5 for each further unit.

=== Contract manufacturing ===
Touring's business began to decline as automobile manufacturers replaced body-on-frame construction with monocoque construction. The carmakers began to build their own bodies in their production lines. However, they were not able to produce less than a few thousand units yearly. Therefore, they decided to assign the body production to coachbuilders. This led coachbuilders to invest in additional manufacturing capacity. Once Touring Superleggera had the new plant in Nova Milanese completed, market fluctuation caused the loss of contractors. The company had to wind-up in 1966, although bankruptcy never occurred.

=== Legacy ===
During the winding up, roughly 80% of Touring Superleggera's archives caught fire. Seeking to reestablish a record of the firm's production, Carlo Felice Bianchi Anderloni got in touch with every owner, creating the Touring Superleggera registry and leading it from 1995 on.

In 1995, he contributed to the revival of Concorso d'Eleganza Villa d'Este, serving as president of the jury until his death in 2003. In his honor, the show began to award the "Carlo Felice Bianchi Anderloni Memorial Trophy" to the most elegant car with a body by Touring.

=== 21st century ===
Alfa Romeo Disco Volante at the 2012 Geneva Motor Show

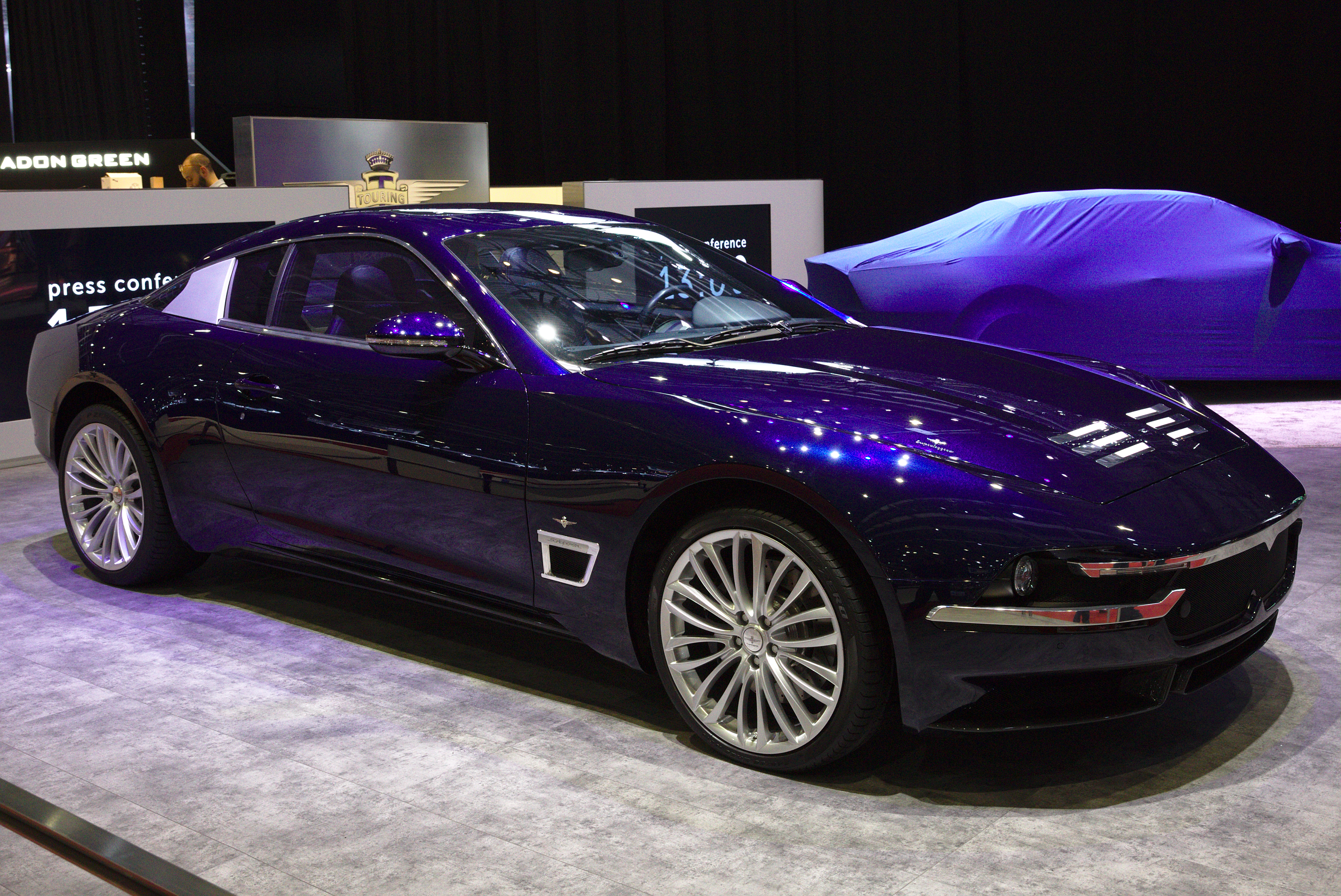
Touring Superleggera Sciàdipersia

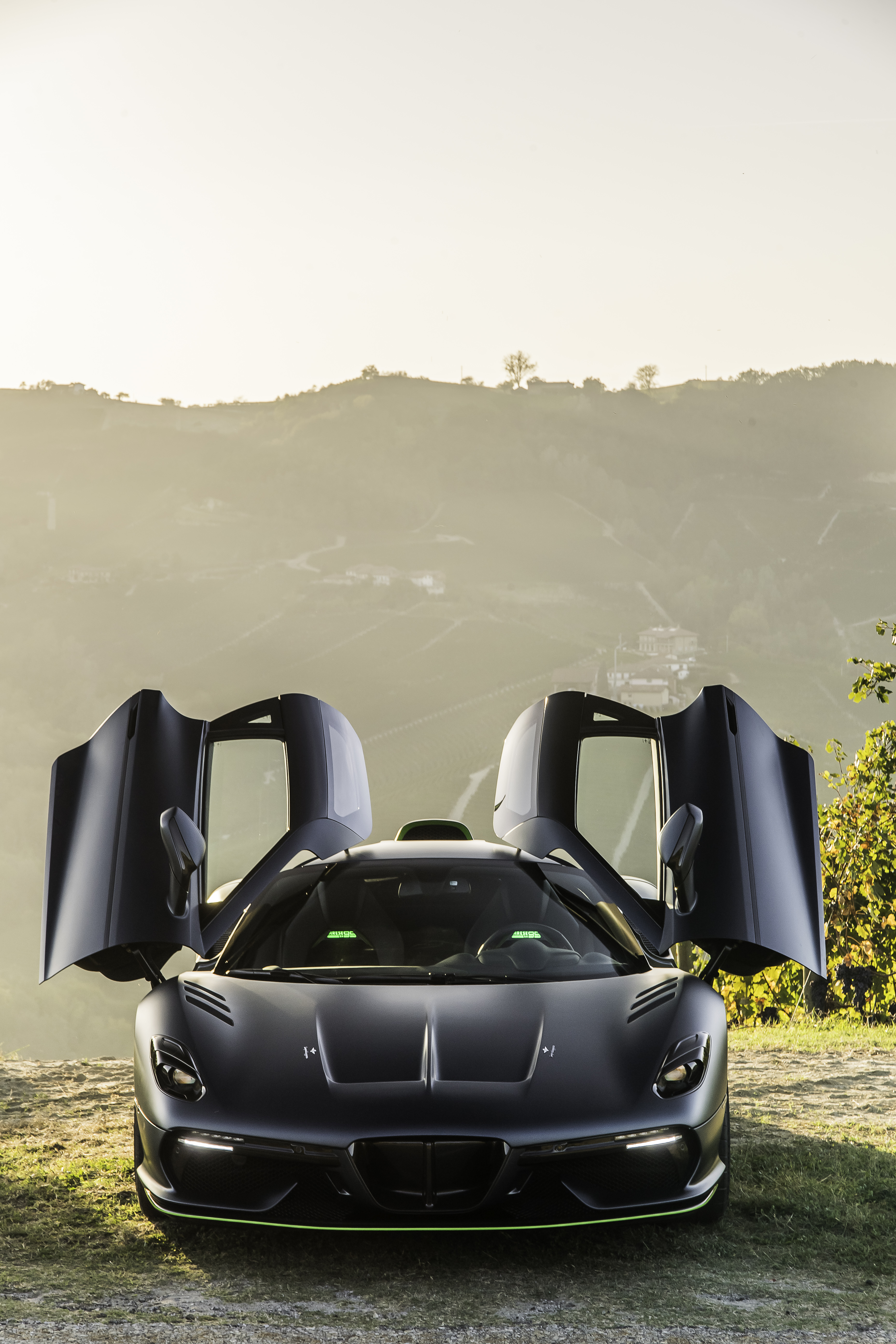
Arese RH95

Superleggera Veloce12

In 2006, a group of private investors specializing in high-end automotive makes, bought the brand and trademarks from the late owner. A newly created firm, Carrozzeria Touring Superleggera S.r.l. was established in Milan to provide automotive design, engineering, coachbuilding, homologation services, non-automotive industrial design, and restoration of historic vehicles.

At the 2008 Concorso d'Eleganza Villa d'Este, Touring debuted the Bellagio Fastback Touring, based on the Maserati Quattroporte and the A8 GCS Berlinetta Touring, a concept car powered by a Maserati drivetrain. At the 2010 Geneva Motor Show, Touring Bentley Continental Flying Star premiered: a shooting-brake model based on the Bentley Continental GTC, coach built in limited series, with the endorsement of Bentley.

In 2011, it was followed by Gumpert Tornante by Touring, a superfast Grand Tourer commissioned by the German sports car manufacturer.

On the stage of the 2012 Geneva Motor Show, Touring Superleggera showcased a static style model based on the space-frame chassis of the Alfa Romeo 8C Competizione. It was a tribute to the C52 Disco Volante, a racing car with a Touring Superleggera designed body introduced in 1952. The name in Italian stands for "Flying Saucer". The Disco Volante was very streamlined, wind tunnel tested and with the body built on a tubular space frame.

The style model gave birth, in 2013 to the Alfa Romeo Disco Volante by Touring, a bespoke car limited-series of eight units that won that year's Design Award at Concorso d'Eleganza Villa d'Este.

Revealed in 2014, the MINI Superleggera Vision is a concept car created in collaboration with BMW Group. It is an electric roadster. Anders Warming, head of MINI design and Touring Superleggera merged their teams to "explore new design languages for the British brand".

The Touring Berlinetta Lusso appeared in 2015. It is a street legal, 2-seater coupé featuring a three-volume form based on the Ferrari F12berlinetta. Like all modern Touring Superleggera models, it combines hand-beaten aluminium panels with carbon fibre. The series will be built in 5 units.

The Aero3 is a car introduced by Touring Superleggera in 2020. Its prominent rear fin was inspired by the aerodynamic berlinetta of the 1930s, particularly the Alfa Romeo 8C 2900B Berlinetta Speciale Le Mans. The Aero3's streamlined design features a rear spoiler and no rear window.

The Arese RH95 was introduced by Touring Superleggera in 2021 to commemorate the company's 95th anniversary. It is Touring's first entry into mid-engined designs. Six variations of the Arese RH95 were produced.

The Superleggera Veloce12 was unveiled at Monterey Car Week in 2024. It is a limited-edition grand tourer, based on the Ferrari 550 Maranello, with a production run of 30 cars planned.

== List of touring cars ==
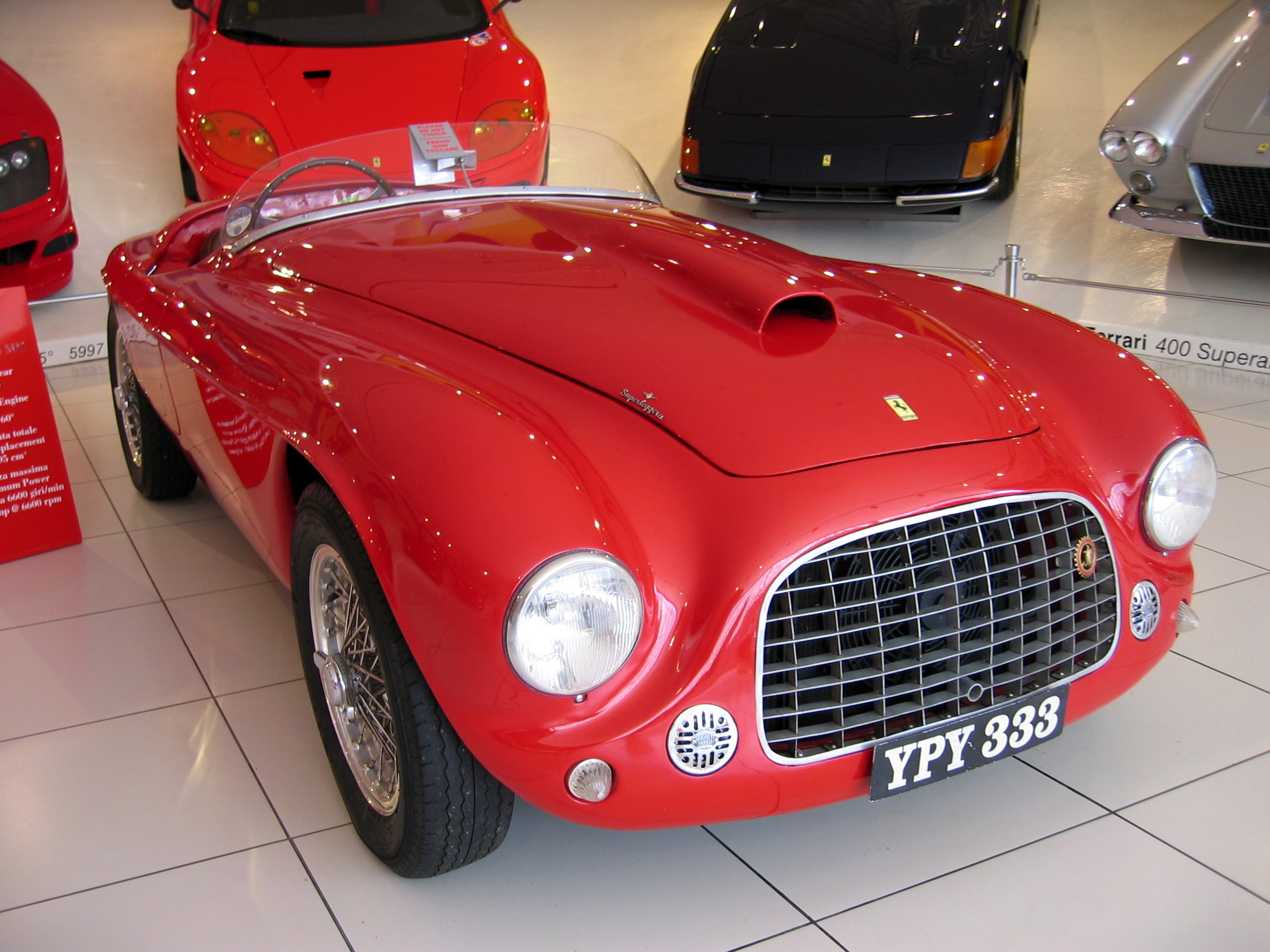
Ferrari 166 MM Barchetta

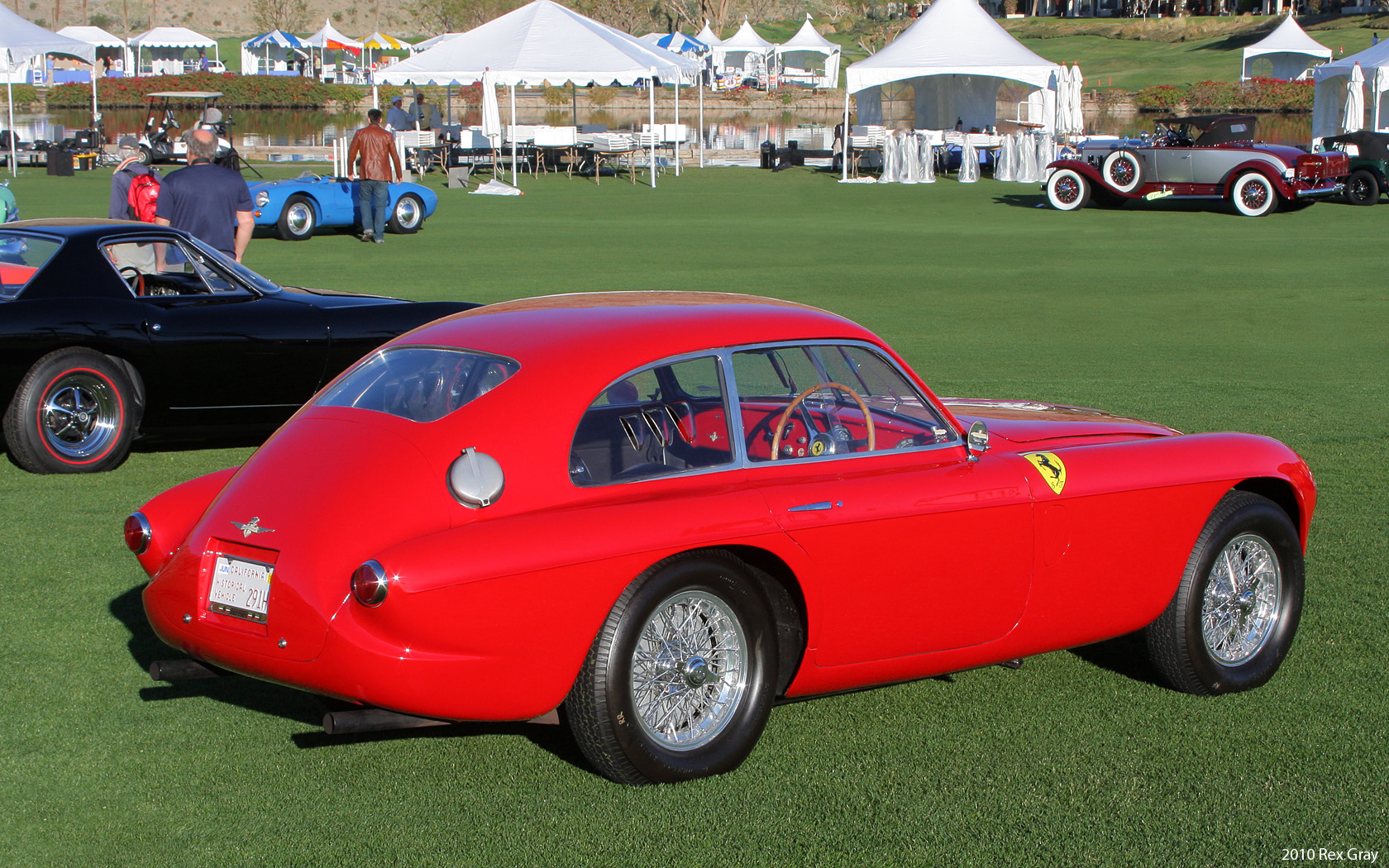
Ferrari 340 America Berlinetta

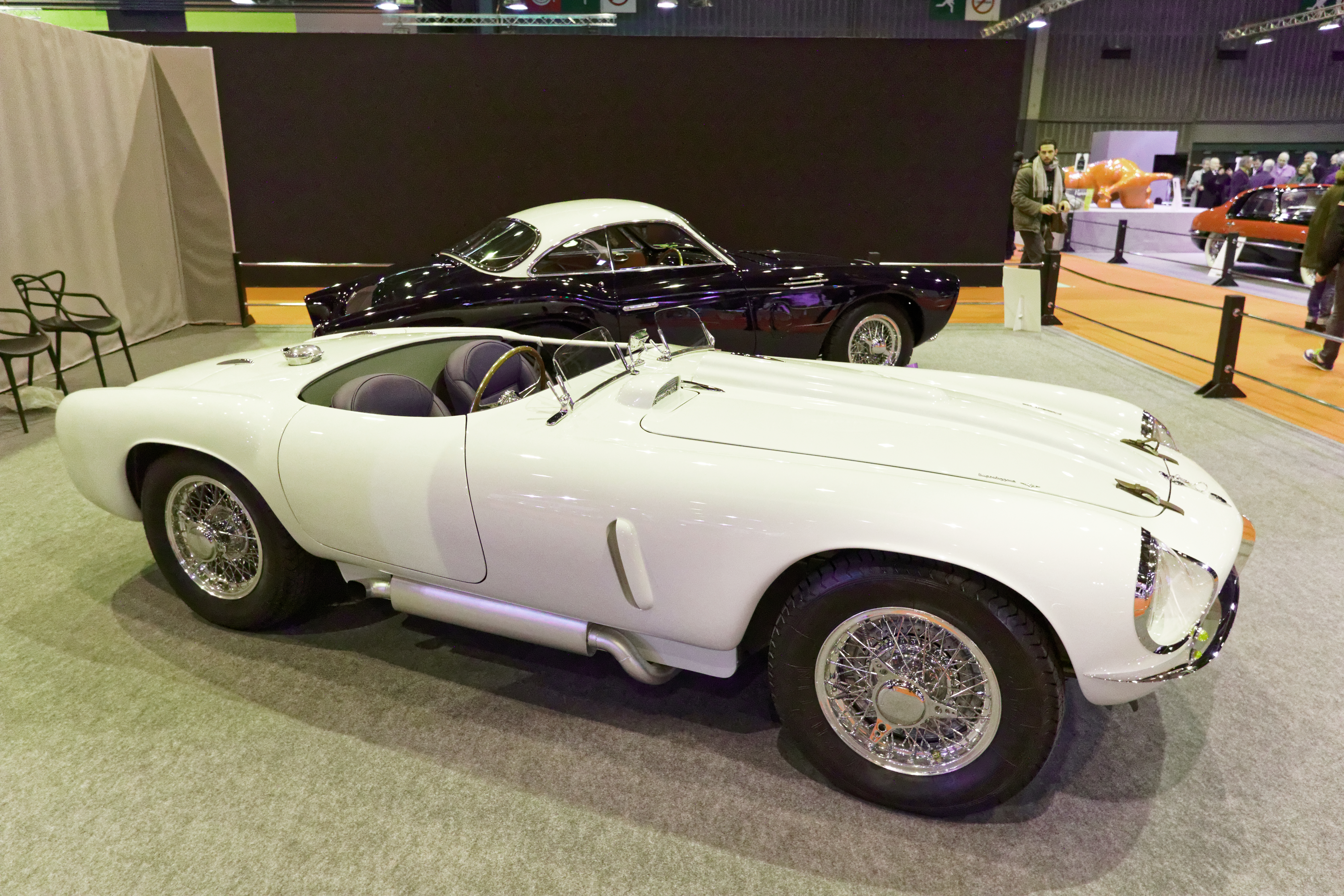
Pegaso Z-102 BS 3.2 Competition Touring Spyder (c.1952)

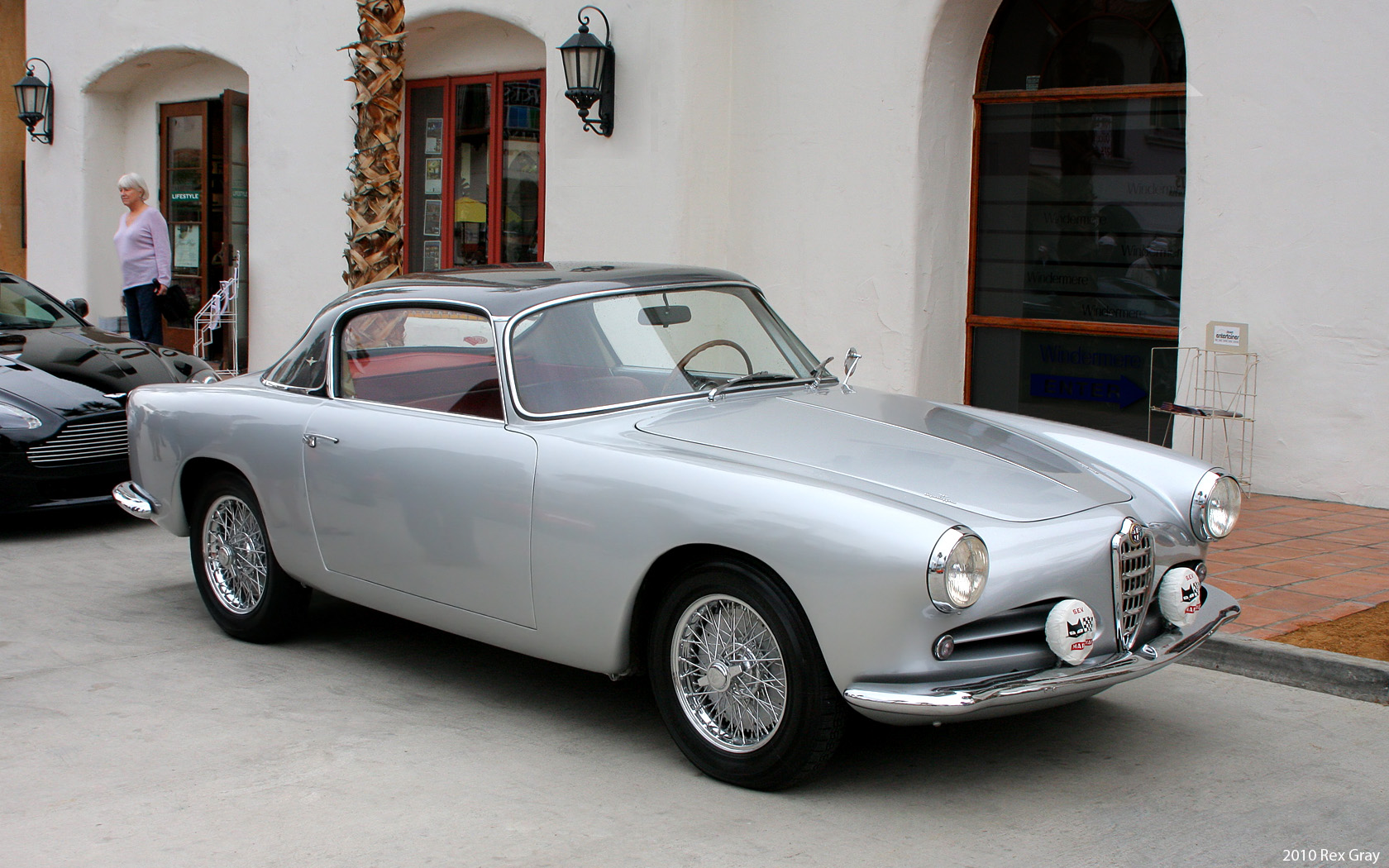
Alfa Romeo 1900C Super Sprint

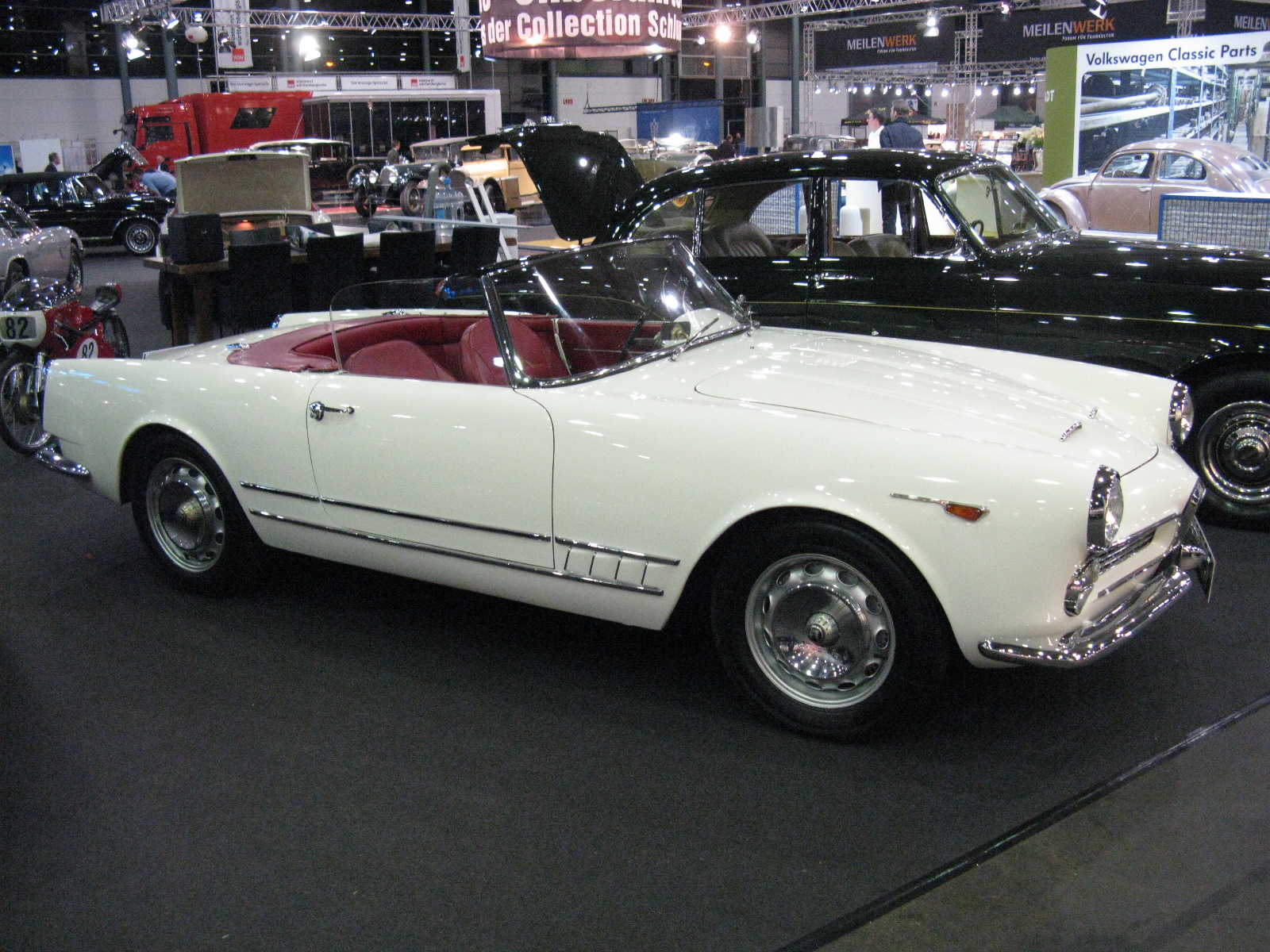
Alfa Romeo 2000 Spider

Maserati 5000 GT Scià di Persia (1959)

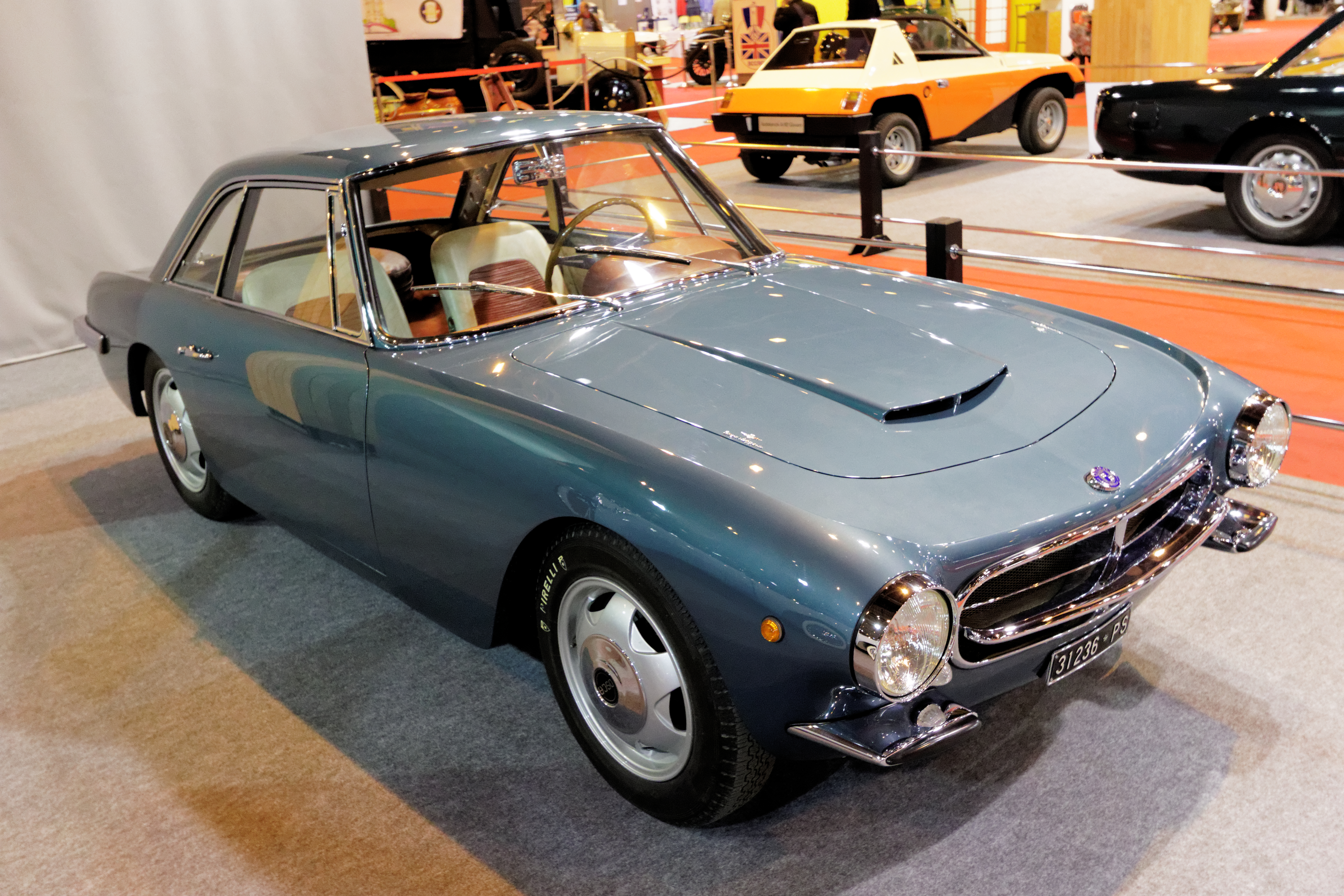
O.S.C.A. 1600 GT

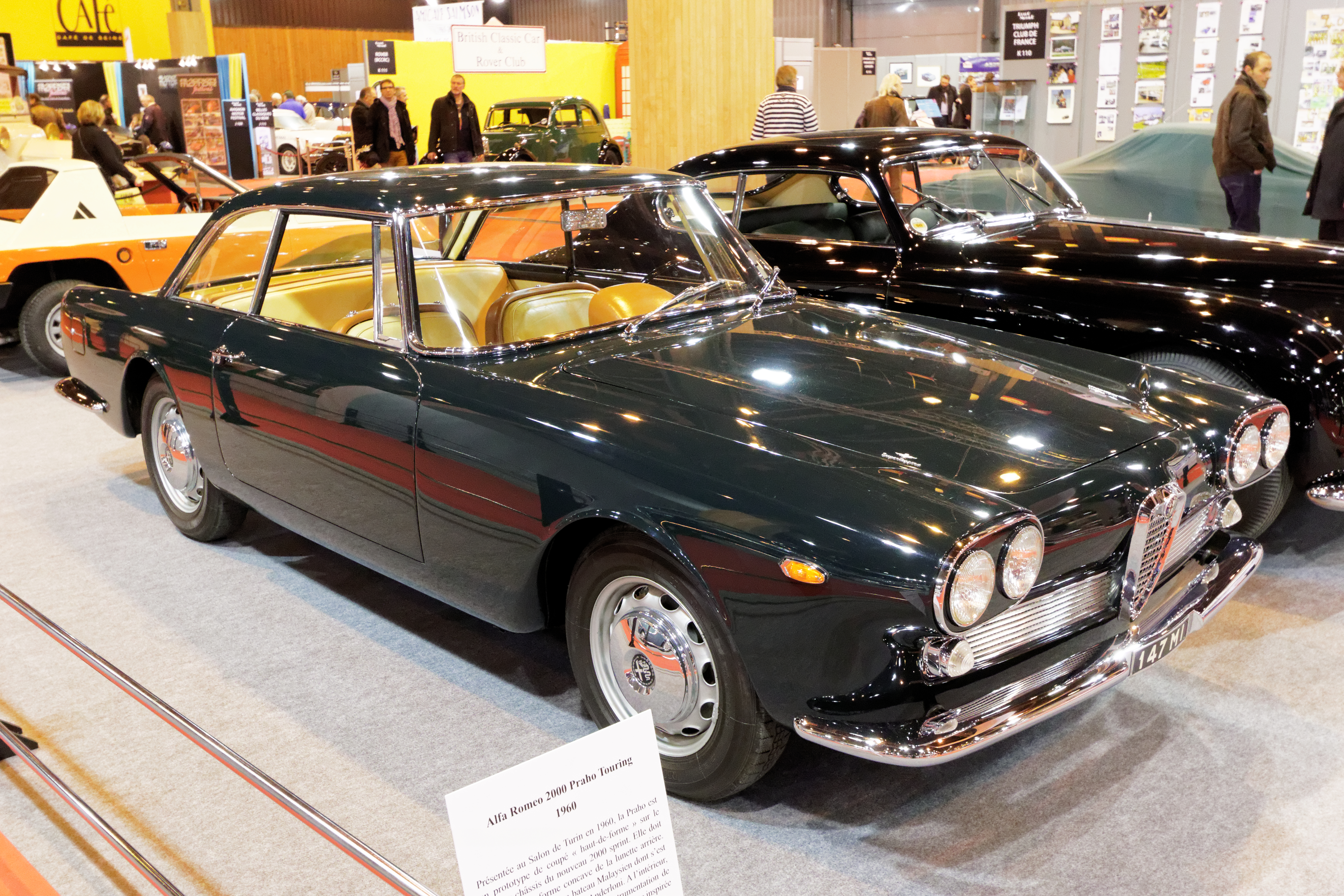
Alfa Romeo 2000 Sprint Praho

Superleggera Arese RH95 Vento D'Oro

- 1927 Alfa Romeo 6C 1500
- 1930s Alfa Romeo 8C
- 1931 Alfa Romeo 6C 1750 GS "Flying Star"
- 1931 Fiat 522C Roadster "Flying Star"
- 1931 Isotta Fraschini Tipo 8A Spyder "Flying Star"
- 1932 Isotta Fraschini Tipo 8B
- 1939 BMW 328 Mille Miglia
- 1940s Alfa Romeo 6C 2500
- 1940 Auto Avio Costruzioni 815
- 1947 Isotta Fraschini Tipo 8C Berlina 2 porte
- 1949 Isotta Fraschini Tipo 8C Berlina 4 porte
- 1948 Ferrari 166 S Coupé "Aerlux"
- 1948 Ferrari 166 MM Berlinetta and Barchetta
- 1948 Ferrari 166 Inter Coupé and Berlinetta
- 1950 Ferrari 275 S Barchetta
- 1950s Alfa Romeo 1900 Sprint
- 1950s Bristol 401
- 1950 Ferrari 195 S Berlinetta and Barchetta
- 1950 Ferrari 195 Inter Coupé
- 1951 Ferrari 340 America Berlinetta and Barchetta
- 1951–1952 Ferrari 212 Export Berlinetta and Barchetta
- 1951–1952 Ferrari 212 Inter Berlinetta and Barchetta
- 1951–1958 Pegaso Z-102
- 1952 Ferrari 340 MM Spyder
- 1952 Alfa Romeo Disco Volante C52
- 1952 Ferrari 225 S Barchetta
- 1953 Hudson Italia
- 1955–1958 Pegaso Z-103
- 1956 Aston Martin DB2/4 Mark II Spider (3 produced)
- 1956 Ferrari 625 LM Spyder
- 1957–1962 Maserati 3500 GT Coupé
- 1959–1960 Maserati 5000 GT Scià di Persia
- 1959–1962 Lancia Flaminia GT, GTL and Convertible
- 1960 Alfa Romeo 2000 Sprint Praho
- 1960s Alfa Romeo 2000 and Alfa Romeo 2600 Spider
- 1960s O.S.C.A. 1600 GT and 1050 Spider
- 1965 Autobianchi Primula Coupé
- 1959–1962 Aston Martin DB4 (built under license by Aston Martin)
- 1963–1965 Aston Martin DB5 (built under license by Aston Martin)
- 1959–1971 Aston Martin DB6 (built under license by Aston Martin)
- 1961–1965 Lagonda Rapide (built under license by Aston Martin)
- 1963–1964 Sunbeam Venezia
- 1964–1966 Alfa Romeo Giulia GTC
- 1964–1966 Lamborghini 350 GT
- 1966–1968 Lamborghini 400 GT
- 1966–1976 Jensen Interceptor
- 1966 Fiat 124 Cabriolet (one prototype)
- 2008 Maserati Bellagio Fastback (estate car based on the Quattroporte)
- 2009 Maserati A8GCS Berlinetta (prototype berlinetta based on the Maserati GranSport)
- 2010 Bentley Continental Flying Star (shooting brake)
- 2011 Gumpert Tornante (prototype based on the Gumpert Apollo)
- 2012 Disco Volante 2012 (concept car)
- 2013 Alfa Romeo Disco Volante by Touring (limited series based on the Alfa Romeo 8C Competizione)
- 2014 Mini Superleggera Vision (concept car based on the 3rd generation Mini)
- 2015 Touring Berlinetta Lusso (coupé based on the Ferrari F12berlinetta)
- 2016 Alfa Romeo Disco Volante Spyder by Touring (limited series based on the Alfa Romeo 8C Spider)
- 2017 Artega Scalo Superelletra (concept car)
- 2018 Touring Sciàdipersia (limited series based on the Maserati GranTurismo)
- 2019 Touring Sciàdipersia Cabriolet (limited series based on the Maserati GranCabrio)
- 2020 Touring Superleggera Aero 3 (based on the Ferrari F12)
- 2021 Touring Superleggera Arese RH95 (based on the Ferrari 488 or Ferrari F8 Tributo)
- 2024 Touring Superleggera Arese RH95 Vento D'Oro
- 2024 Superleggera Veloce12 (based on Ferrari 550 Maranello)

== Notable designers ==
- Felice Bianchi Anderloni
- Giuseppe Seregni
- Carlo Felice Bianchi Anderloni
- Federico Formenti
- Louis de Fabribeckers
- Matteo Gentile

== Awards ==
1931
Concorso d’Eleganza Villa D’Este

- Coppa d'Oro Villa D'Este – Isotta Fraschini 8B spider "Flying Star"
- Gran Premio Referendum – Alfa Romeo 6C 1750 Gran Sport Spider "Flying Star"

Concorso d'Eleganza di Genova Nervi

- Premio Assoluto e Premio di Categoria – Isotta Fraschini 8B spider "Flying Star"

1932
Concorso d’Eleganza Villa D'Este

- Coppa d’Oro Villa D’Este & Gran Premio Referendum – Alfa Romeo 8C 2300 Coupé Spyder Touring

1949
Concorso d’Eleganza Villa D'Este

- Coppa d’Oro Villa D'Este – Alfa Romeo 8C 2500 SS Coupé Touring

1953
Concorso d'Eleganza di Stresa

- Gran Premio d'Onore – 1953 Z102 Berlinetta "Thrill"

1988
Concorso d'Eleganza di Stresa

- Best of Show – 1937 Alfa Romeo 8C 2900B Touring Spyder

1996
Concorso d'Eleganza Villa D'Este

- Trophy A.C. Como – Best in Show by the Jury – 1938 Alfa Romeo 8C 2900B

1997
Concorso d'Eleganza Villa D'Este

- Coppa d'Oro Villa D'Este – 1942 Alfa Romeo 6C 2500 Sport
- Trophy A.C. Como – Best in Show by the Jury – 1950 Alfa Romeo 6C 2500 Super Sport

1999
Pebble Beach Concours d'Elegance

- Best of class – 1960 Maserati 5000 GT Touring
- Best of class – 1938 Alfa Romeo 8C 2900 B Touring Spyder

2000
Concorso d'Eleganza Villa D'Este

- Trophy BMW – Best in Show by the Jury – 1938 Alfa Romeo 6C 2300 B MM

2001
Concorso d'Eleganza Villa D'Este

- Coppa d'Oro Villa D'Este – 1951 Alfa Romeo 6C 2500 SS "Villa d’Este" Cabriolet Touring.
- Trophy BMW Italia – 1951 Ferrari 340 America Barchetta Touring.

2005
Pebble Beach Concours d'Elegance

- Best of class – Ferrari 166 MM barchetta

2007
Concorso d'Eleganza Villa D'Este

- Trophy BMW Italia – 1931 Alfa Romeo 6C 1750 GS Flying Star Touring

2008
Concorso d'Eleganza Villa D'Este

- Trophy BMW Group Best in show by the Jury – 1949 Ferrari 166 MM Berlinetta Touring.
- Trophy Auto & Design – Pegaso Thrill

Pebble Beach Concours d'Elegance

- Best of show – 1938 Alfa Romeo 8C 2900B Touring Berlinetta

Festival Automobile International

- Gran Prix de la Plus Belle Supercar de l’Année – 2008 A8GCS Berlinetta Touring.

Vuitton Classic

- Best of show – 1938 Alfa Romeo 8C 2900B Spyder Touring

2009
Concorso d'Eleganza Villa D'Este

- Coppa d'Oro Villa D'Este – 1938 Alfa Romeo, 8C 2900B
- Trophy BMW Group Best in show by the Jury – 1938 Alfa Romeo, 8C 2900B

Pebble Beach Concours d'Elegance

- Road & Track Trophy – 1949 Ferrari 166MM barchetta Touring.

Vuitton Classic

- Classic Concours Awards – 1949 Ferrari 166MM Berlinetta

2010
Vuitton Classic

- Classic Concours Awards – 1938 Alfa Romeo 8C 2900B

2012
Salon Prive

- Best of Show – 1950 Ferrari 166MM Barchetta

Windsor Castle Concours

- Best of Show – 1938 Alfa Romeo 8C 2900B

Pebble Beach Concours d'Elegance

- Class M-2 Ferrari Competition – 1951 First Ferrari 212 Export Touring Berlinetta
- Class O-2: Postwar Sports Closed 2nd – 1958 Pegaso Z-103 Touring Berlinetta
- Class O-3: Postwar Sports Touring 2nd – 1950 Alfa Romeo 6C 2500 SS Touring Coupé
- Special Awards: The Vitesse Elegance Trophy – 1950 Alfa Romeo 6C 2500 SS Touring Coupé

2013
Amelia Island Concours d'Elegance

- Best in class Lamborghini – 1966 Lamborghini 350
- Best in class Sports and GT Cars (1958–1962) – 1958 Pegaso Z-103 Touring Berlinetta
- Best in class Sports and GT Cars (1963–1974) – 1964 Aston Martin DB5 Convertible

Governor's Cup at Elegance at Hershey

- Best of Show – awarded to an unrestored 1938 Alfa Romeo 8C 2900B Spider from the collection of Robert and Sandra Bahre of Alton, New Hampshire. The Carrozzeria Touring-bodied Superleggera Alfa, built on the short chassis, also won the Ciao Italy Award for Best Italian Pre-War car exhibited.

Concorso d'Eleganza Villa D'Este

- Award for Concept Cars & Prototypes By Public Referendum at Villa Erba – 2013 Alfa Romeo Disco Volante by Touring
- Class Winner Aston Martin – 1962 Aston Martin DB4 SS Saloon TouringClass
- Class Winner Lamborghini – 1965 Lamborghini 350 GTS Spider Touring

2014
Concorso d'Eleganza Villa D'Este

- Mention of Honour class “Villa d’Este Style” – 1949 Alfa Romeo 6C 2500ss Berlinetta Aerlux
- ASI Trophy to the best preserved post war-car Hudson Italia Prototype H01

Concours d’Elegance Chantilly Arts & Elegance

- Prix Richard Mille – 2013 Alfa Romeo Disco Volante by Touring
- Les Années Design (les Concept-Cars 1960–1970) – Prix Le Point – 1966 Lamborghini Flying Star Touring II
- Les Grandes Carrosseries Maserati – 1958 Prix Spécial N°1 – Maserati 3500 GT Spyder Touring (1958)

2015
Concorso d'Eleganza Villa D'Este

- Best of Show by Public Referendum at Villa d'Este, Coppa d’Oro Villa d'Este, BMW Group Trophy & Mention of Honor – 1949 Ferrari 166MM Barchetta Touring.
