= Carlo Felice Bianchi Anderloni =

Italian automobile designer

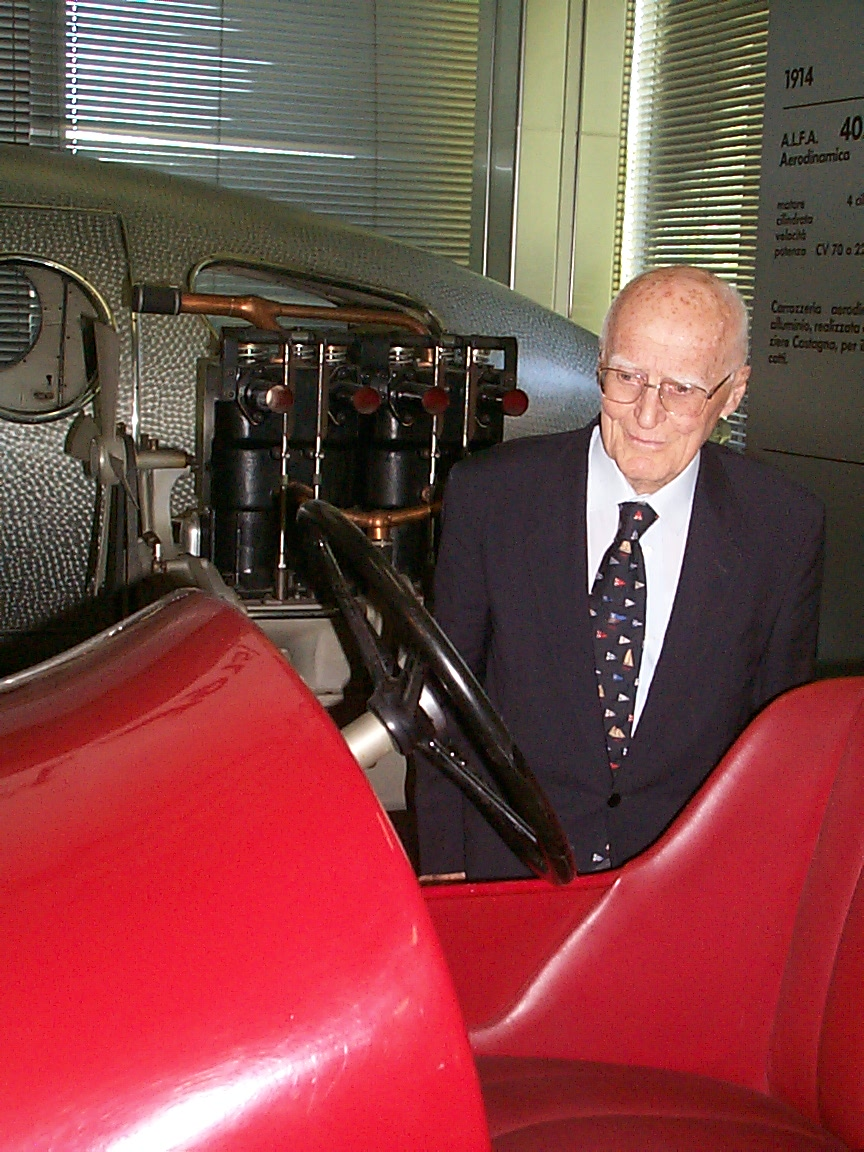
Anderloni at the Alfa Museum, 22 May 2003

Carlo Felice Bianchi "Cici" Anderloni (7 April 1916 – 7 August 2003) was an Italian automobile designer, who created multiple designs for the Carrozzeria Touring Superleggera company.

He joined his father, Felice Bianchi Anderloni (1882–1949), at his company Carrozzeria Touring Superleggera (1944), after completing his studies at the Politecnico di Milano. Following his father's death in 1949, he took charge of the design and production efforts. He was first involved in the Alfa Romeo 6C 2500 SS coupe (1949) and the Ferrari 166 S (in barchetta body). The company was discontinued (1966) and Anderloni joined Alfa Romeo as advisor and later, as designer. Later he was involved in the Associazione Italiana per la Storia dell'Automobile, was a frequently used judge at the Concorso d'Eleganza Villa d'Este exhibitions, and led the Touring registry (1995-).

== Literature ==
- Giacomo Tavoletti, Il signor Touring: Carlo Felice Bianchi Anderloni (Automobilia, 2004)
