= Lamborghini 350 GTV =

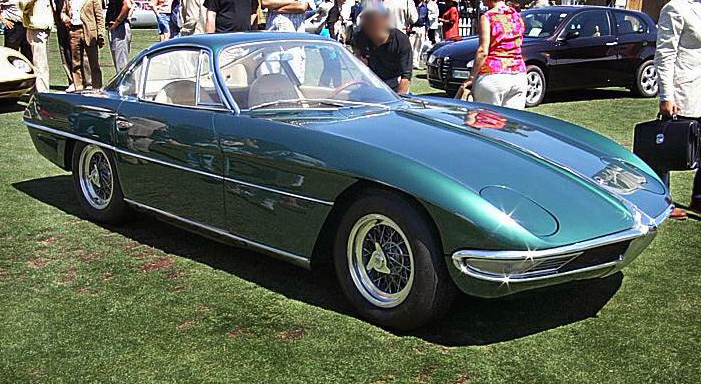

Overview
- Manufacturer: Lamborghini (chassis); Carrozzeria Sargiotto (body)
- Production: 1963
- Designer: Franco Scaglione

Body and chassis
- Class: Prototype / Sports car
- Body style: 2-door grand tourer coupé
- Layout: Longitudinal front-engine, rear-wheel drive

Powertrain
- Engine: 3.5 L (3,464 cc) Lamborghini V12
- Transmission: 5-speed ZF manual

Dimensions
- Wheelbase: 2,450 mm (96.5 in)
- Length: 4,370 mm (172.0 in)
- Width: 1,760 mm (69.3 in)
- Height: 1,050 mm (41.3 in)
- Kerb weight: 1,292 kg (2,848 lb)

Chronology
- Successor: Lamborghini 350 GT

The Lamborghini 350 GTV is a Lamborghini prototype and forerunner of the automaker's first production model, the 350 GT. It was first presented to the public at the 1963 Turin Auto Show.

== Development ==
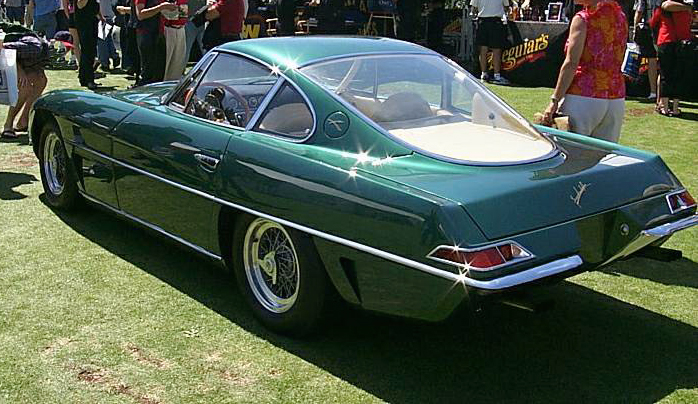
Rear three-quarter view

The design and development of the 350 GTV was overseen by Lamborghini chief engineer Giampaolo Dallara, assistant Paolo Stanzani and test driver Bob Wallace, the core engineering team that developed many early Lamborghini cars. Giotto Bizzarrini was commissioned to design the engine and an early version of the chassis.

The 350 GTV's name signified the 3.5 L displacement of the engine, the "GT" for grand tourer and the "V" for the Italian word "Veloce" (meaning "fast").

The 350 GTV body was designed by Franco Scaglione and built by Carrozzeria Sargiotto in Turin. Ferruccio Lamborghini's opinion had a significant amount of influence on the design. He reportedly requested styling echoing the Aston Martin DB4's tapering rear bodywork and the sleek front of the Jaguar E-type. The 350 GTV had many styling details that were unusual at the time of its introduction, including hidden headlamps and six exhaust tailpipes (three on each side of the car's rear). The body was constructed of aluminum and steel. As workers at Sargiotto were primarily skilled in building molds for plastic products, the 350 GTV's body had numerous fit and finish issues.

Initially, Bizzarrini designed a racing-style tubular spaceframe chassis for the 350 GTV. Giorgio Neri and Luciano Bonacini built the tube frame chassis in Modena. This design was later reworked by Dallara into a more conventional, heavier design constructed of mostly square and rectangular section tubing that would be used in the production 350 GT.

Ferruccio Lamborghini commissioned Giotto Bizzarrini to develop the 350 GTV engine. This was the first iteration of the Lamborghini V12 series of engines, which would power future Lamborghini models up through the end of Murciélago production in 2010. Bizzarrini developed a 3.5 litre racing-specification V12 engine, with an output of 255 kW (347 PS; 342 bhp) at 8,000 rpm, and torque of 326 N⋅m (240 lbf⋅ft), using the DIN measurement standard. This design was derived from Bizzarrini's plan for a 1.5 litre Formula One racing engine. Top speed was claimed by the factory to be 280 kilometres per hour (170 mph), although this was an estimate as the car was never driven or tested by the factory.

This engine had a compression ratio of 9.5:1 and relatively aggressive valve timing compared to later versions of the Lamborghini V12. The higher redline, compression ratio and timing made the 350 GTV's engine more suitable for competition use rather than as a comfortable road car. The 350 GTV engine was also equipped with six downdraft Weber carburetors and a dry sump lubrication system.

The transmission was a 5 speed manual made by ZF. Power was directed to the rear wheels via a Salisbury self-locking differential. The independent suspension used triangular wishbones on the front and trapezoidal wishbones on the rear, with telescopic shock absorbers and coil springs at all four corners. Servo-controlled disc brakes were equipped on all four wheels. The Borrani center locking wire wheels were fitted with Pirelli Cinturato HS tires.

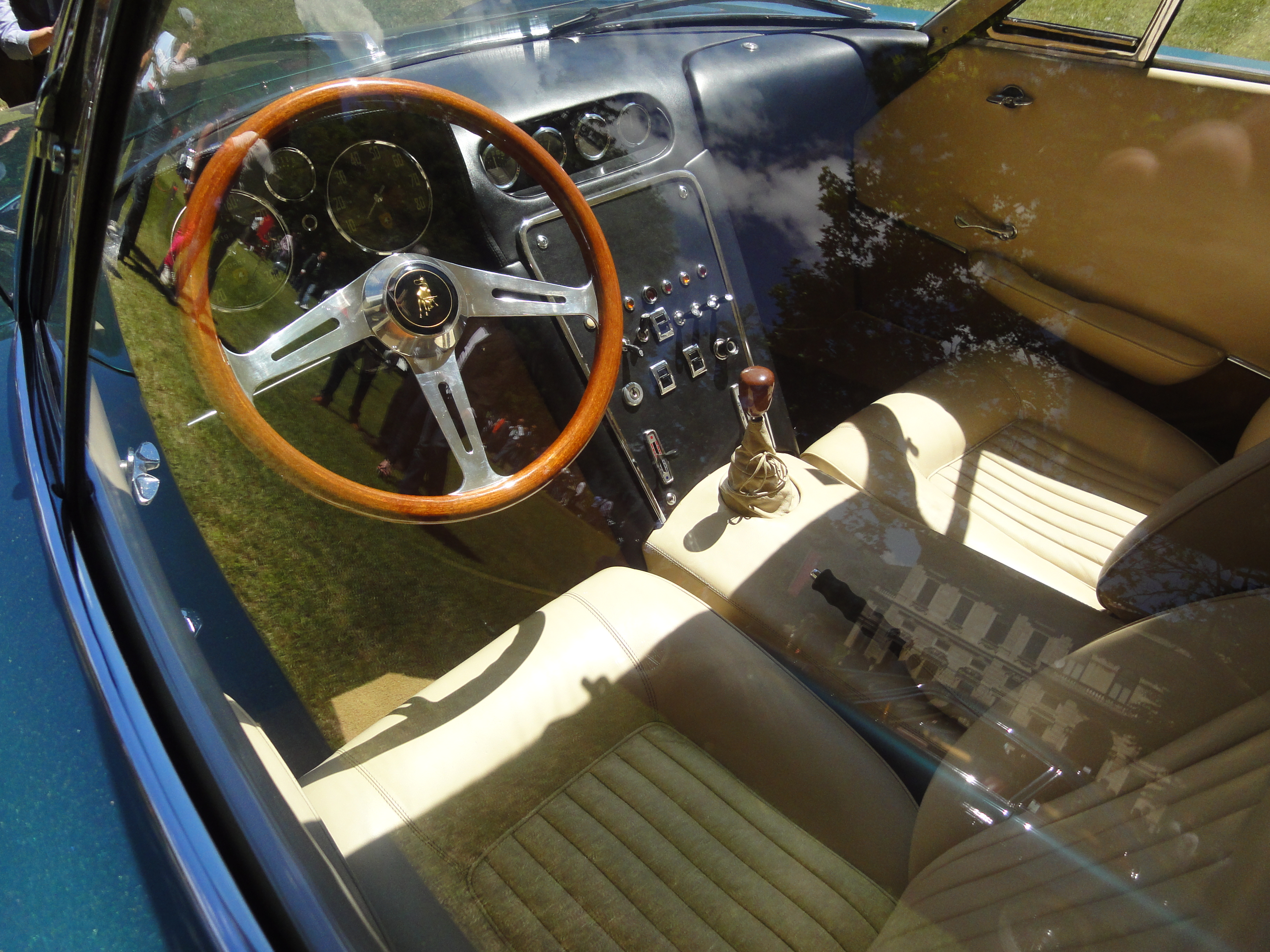
350 GTV Interior

The 350 GTV was never a complete, driveable car during its time as a Lamborghini prototype. During assembly, the workforce discovered that the body panels would not fit around the engine. Since he had no further plans for the 350 GTV beyond being a show car, Mr. Lamborghini had the engine bay ballasted with bricks and kept the bonnet shut throughout the Turin Auto Show. The incomplete show car also lacked brake calipers, foot pedals and windshield wipers.

== Introduction and influence ==
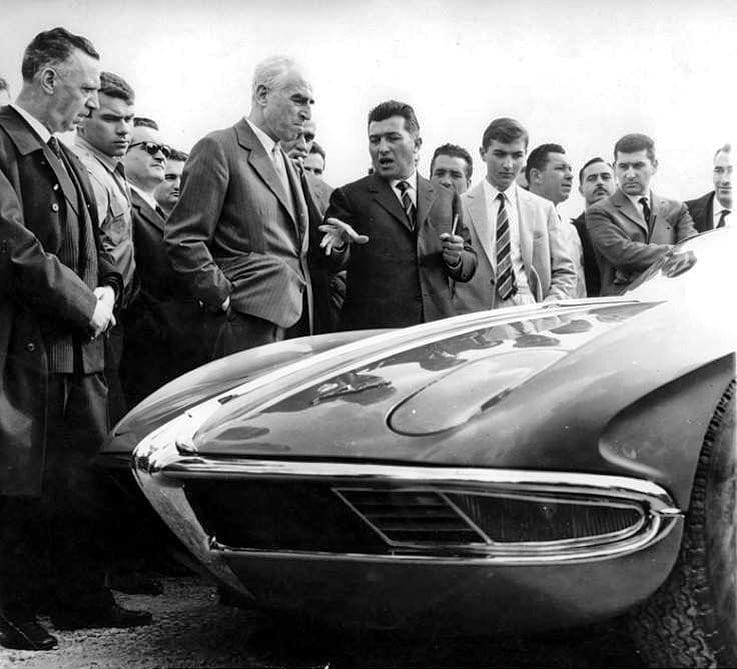
Ferruccio Lamborghini (center, with hand outstretched) discussing the newly introduced 350 GTV with journalist Giovanni Canestrini

The 350 GTV was introduced to the public at the 1963 Turin Auto Show. It was covered extensively by the press and received both positive and negative reactions. A sales brochure was produced and Ferruccio Lamborghini used the unveiling of this prototype to cultivate interest in a production version. At the time of the 350 GTV's introduction, Mr. Lamborghini told Road & Track magazine of his intention to make both touring and competition versions of the 350 GTV, although no competition version was ever realized. Lamborghini later garnered a reputation for being reluctant to build racing versions of his cars.

Ferruccio Lamborghini was dissatisfied with several design features of the 350 GTV, and with the state of tune of the engine. He commissioned Carrozzeria Touring to redesign the car to be more practical and had the engine detuned to 270 bhp (201 kW; 274 PS) at 6,500 rpm for use in the production car. The compression ratio and redline were lowered and the camshaft profiles altered to moderate the valve timing. The racing-derived dry sump lubrication and downdraft carburetors were also replaced with a simpler wet sump system and a more common model of Weber sidedraft carburetors. The new body and retuned engine resulted in the first production Lamborghini, the 350 GT.

== Later history ==
After the 1963 Turin Auto Show, the 350 GTV was placed into storage at the Lamborghini factory. The 350 GTV remained in storage until the mid-1980s, when car dealer Romano Bernardoni and his cousin, Lamborghini expert Stefano Pasini, convinced the management to sell the 350 GTV to them. Bernardoni and Pasini did not receive the gauges and steering wheel with the car. They did, however, receive several proposals to modify the car into running condition and accepted one. During the modification process, the car's colour was changed from its original pale blue to deep metallic green at the owner's request.

The 350 GTV was then sold to a Japanese collector, who placed the car in the Noritake Collection. Several years later, the 350 GTV was placed on display at the Lamborghini Museum in Sant'Agata Bolognese, Italy.
