= Lamborghini 350 GT =

Italian sports car

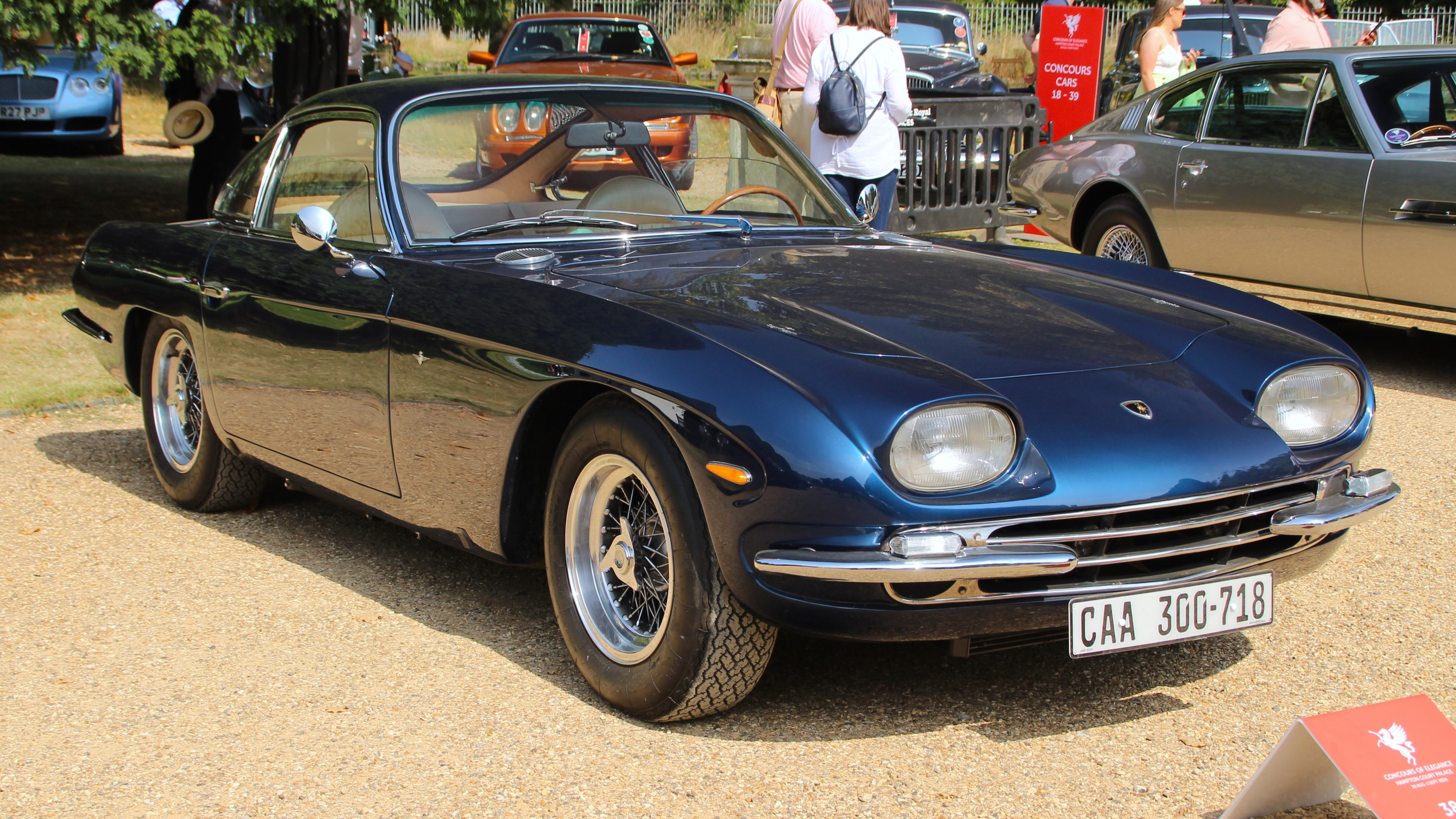

Overview
- Manufacturer: Carrozzeria Touring for Lamborghini
- Production: May 1964–1966; 120 built
- Assembly: Italy: Sant'Agata Bolognese
- Designer: Carrozzeria Touring

Body and chassis
- Class: Grand tourer
- Body style: 2-door coupé; 2-door roadster (350 GTS)
- Layout: FR layout

Powertrain
- Engine: 3.5 L (3,464 cc) Lamborghini V12
- Power output: 280 hp (206 kW) and 325 N⋅m (240 lb⋅ft) of torque
- Transmission: 5-speed ZF manual

Dimensions
- Wheelbase: 2,550 mm (100.4 in)
- Length: 4,640 mm (182.7 in)
- Width: 1,730 mm (68.1 in)
- Height: 1,220 mm (48.0 in)
- Kerb weight: 1,450 kg (3,197 lb)

Chronology
- Predecessor: Lamborghini 350 GTV
- Successor: Lamborghini 400 GT

The Lamborghini 350 GT is a grand tourer manufactured by Lamborghini between 1964 and 1966. It was the first production vehicle produced by Lamborghini. The 350 GT was based on the earlier Lamborghini 350 GTV and was equipped with a 3.5 litre V12 engine and a 2-door coupé body by Carrozzeria Touring. The 350 GT debuted at the March 1964 Geneva Motor Show and production began the following May. The success of this model ensured the company's survival, establishing it as a viable competitor with rival manufacturer Ferrari.

== History ==
=== Initial design team ===
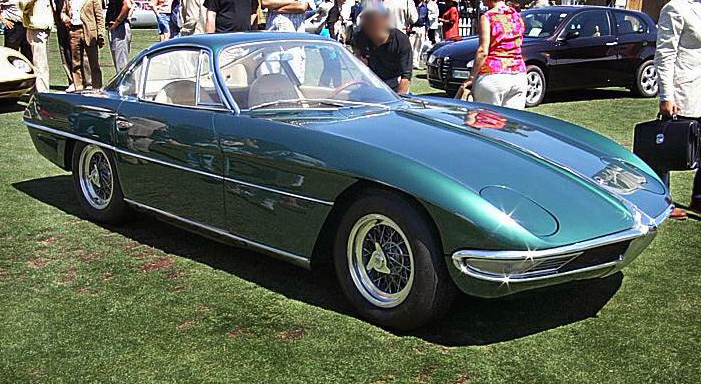
1963 Lamborghini 350 GTV Prototype

After the testing of his prototype Lamborghini engine in May 1963, then-lead engineer Giotto Bizzarrini left the company. The following month Ferruccio Lamborghini tasked engineer Giampaolo Dallara with developing a production version of Bizzarrini's 350 GTV grand tourer. Dallara was assisted in this project by engineer Paolo Stanzani and test driver Bob Wallace.

Dallara and Stanzani quickly realised that the 350 GTV was not properly designed for mass production. They began working in parallel on two projects that would result in the production 350 GT. First, they began de-tuning the original Bizzarrini engine and redesigning the original Bizzarrini chassis for street use. Second, they started readying the 350 GTV for its late-October 1963 Turin Auto Show debut, where Lamborghini hoped it would raise interest in the eventual production 350 GT.

=== Redesigning the GTV Prototype ===
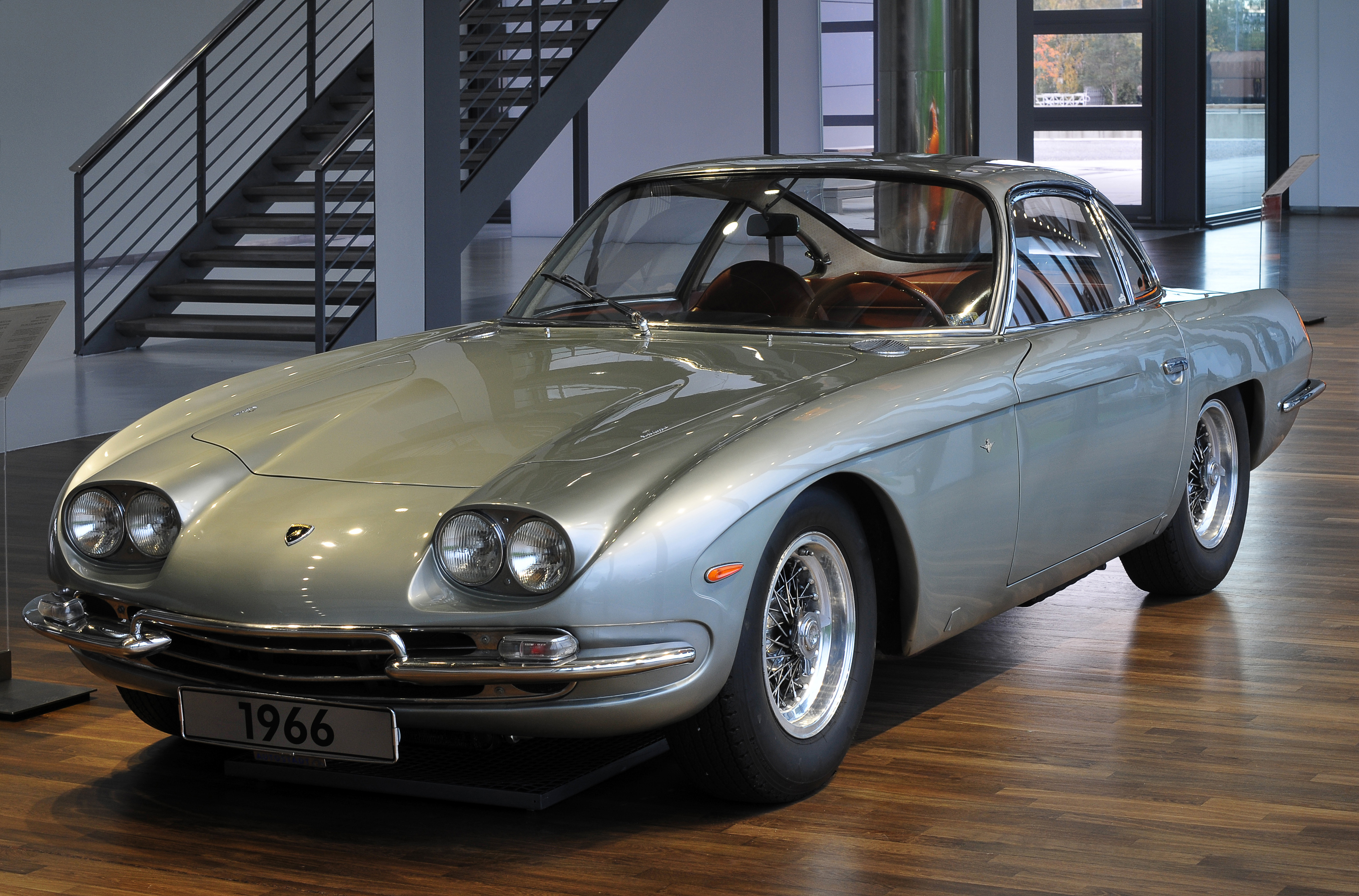
1966 Lamborghini 350 GT

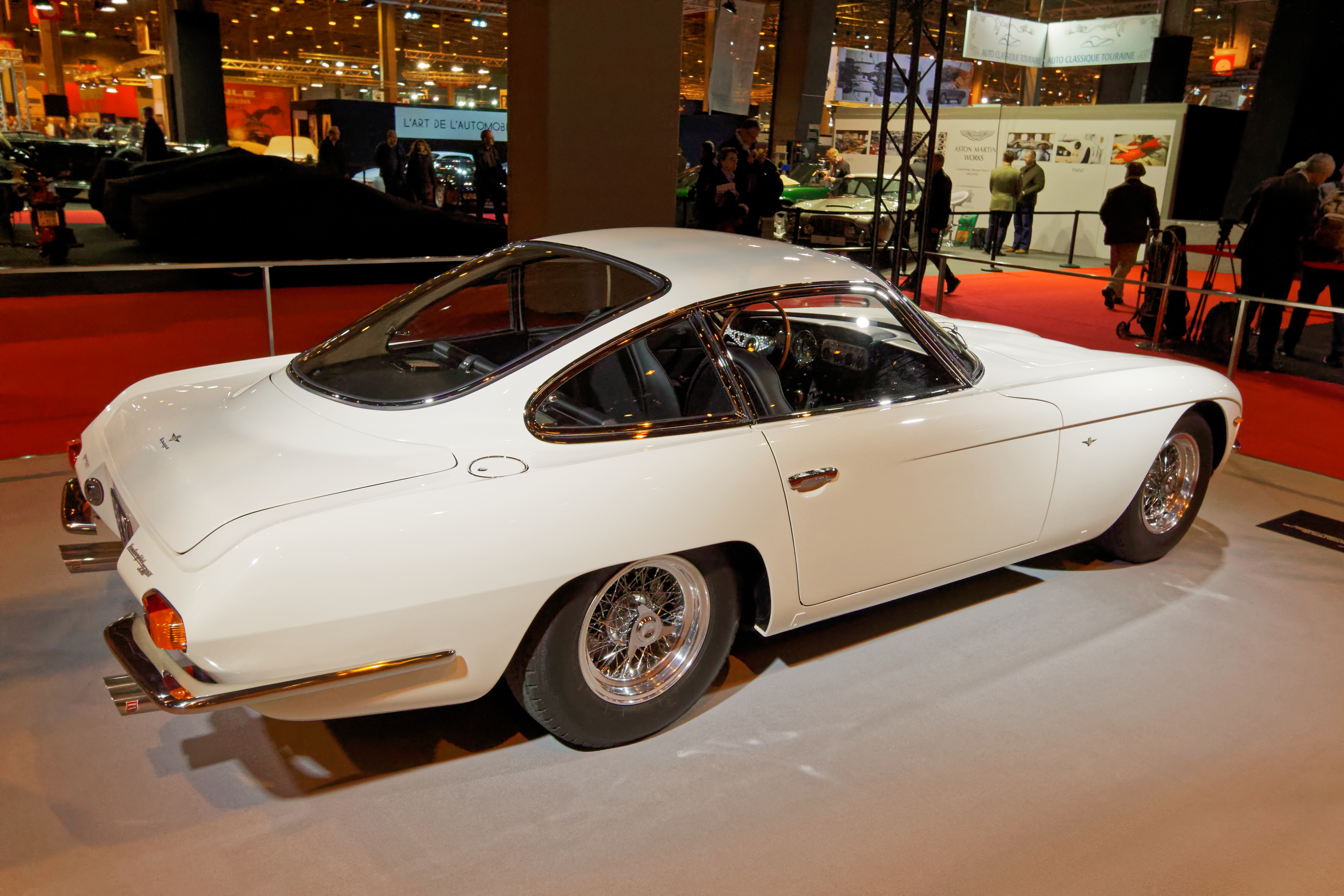
1964 Lamborghini 350 GT rear

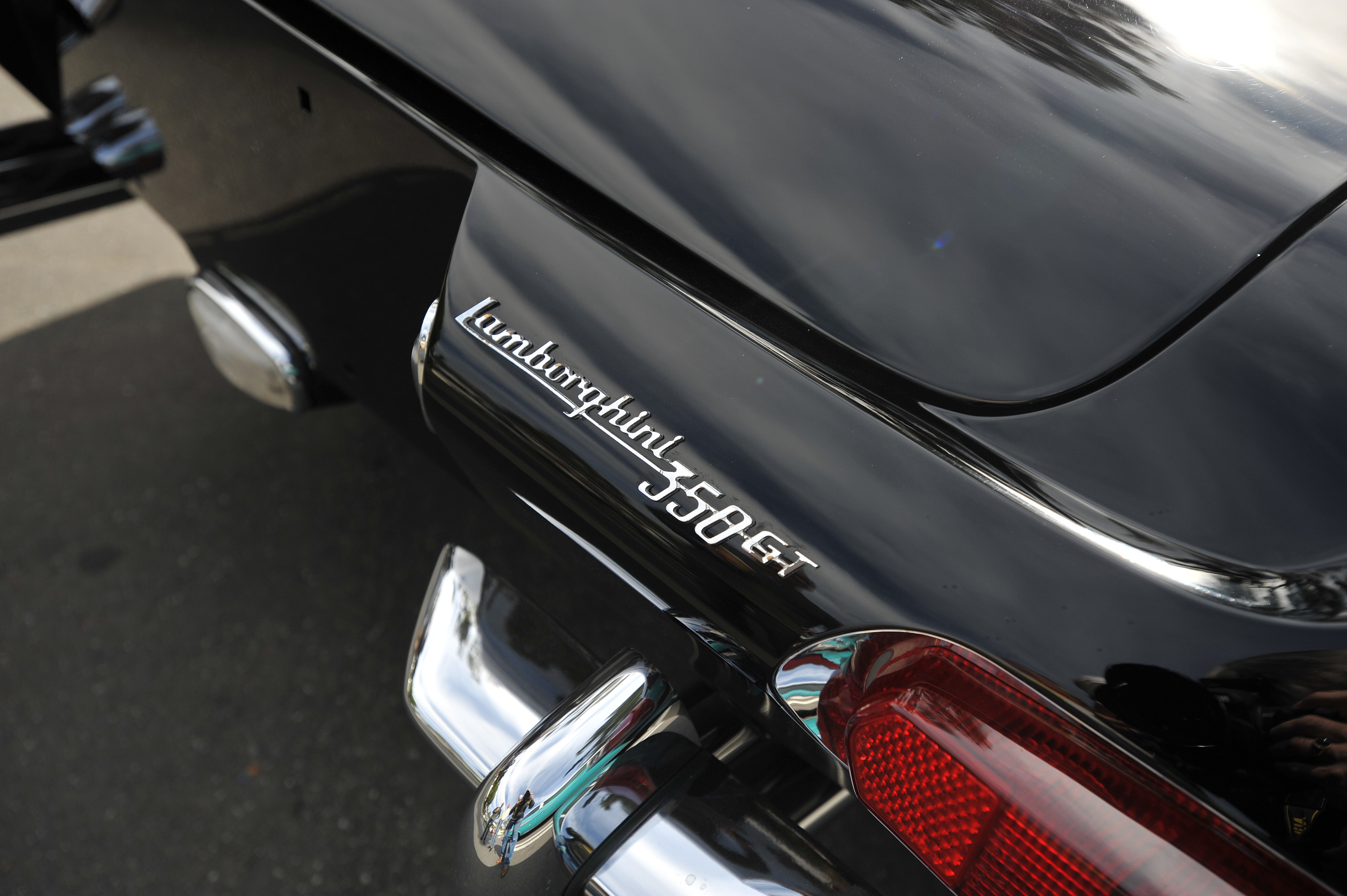
1965 Lamborghini 350 GT rear detail

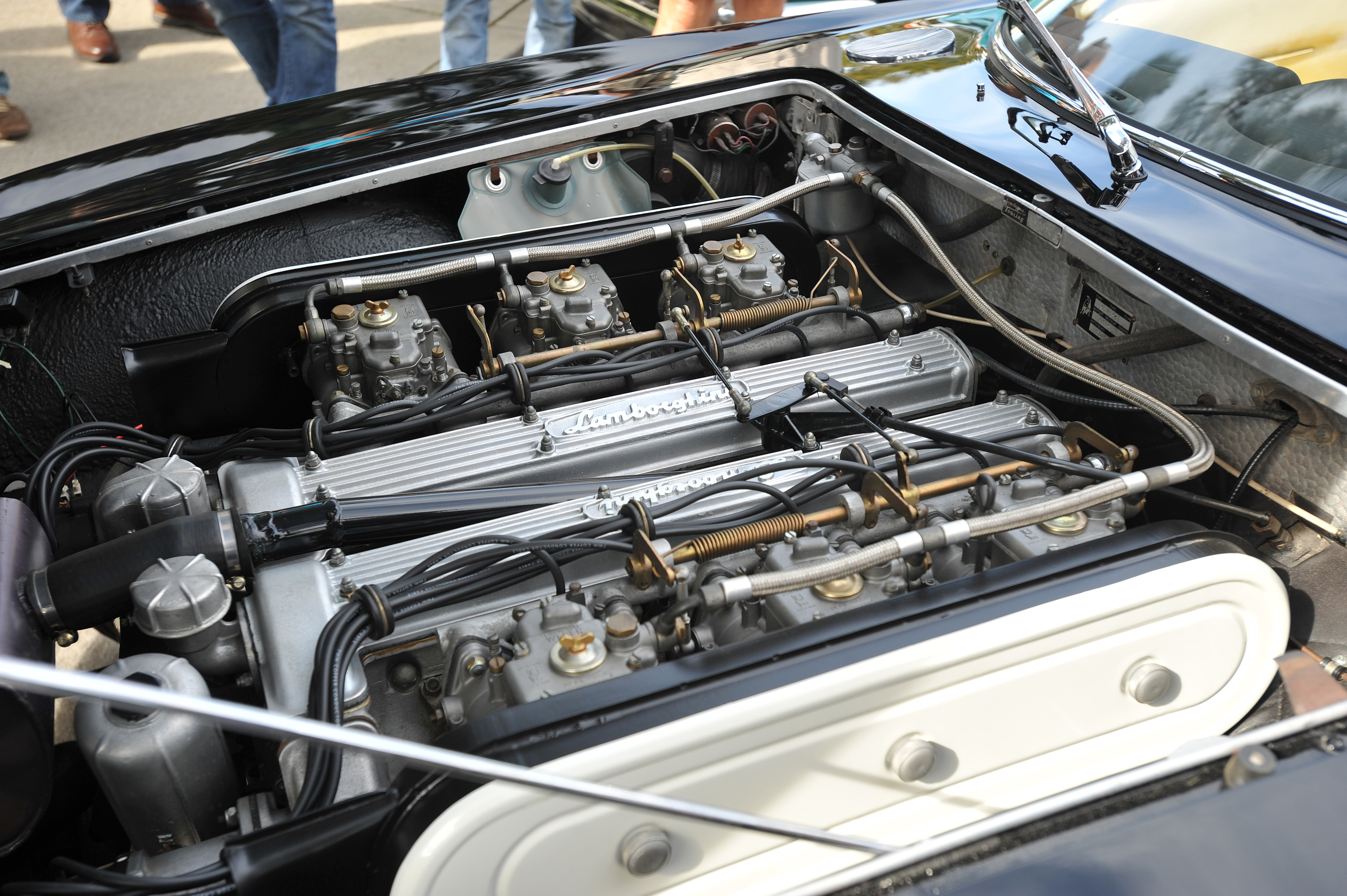
1965 Lamborghini 350 GT engine

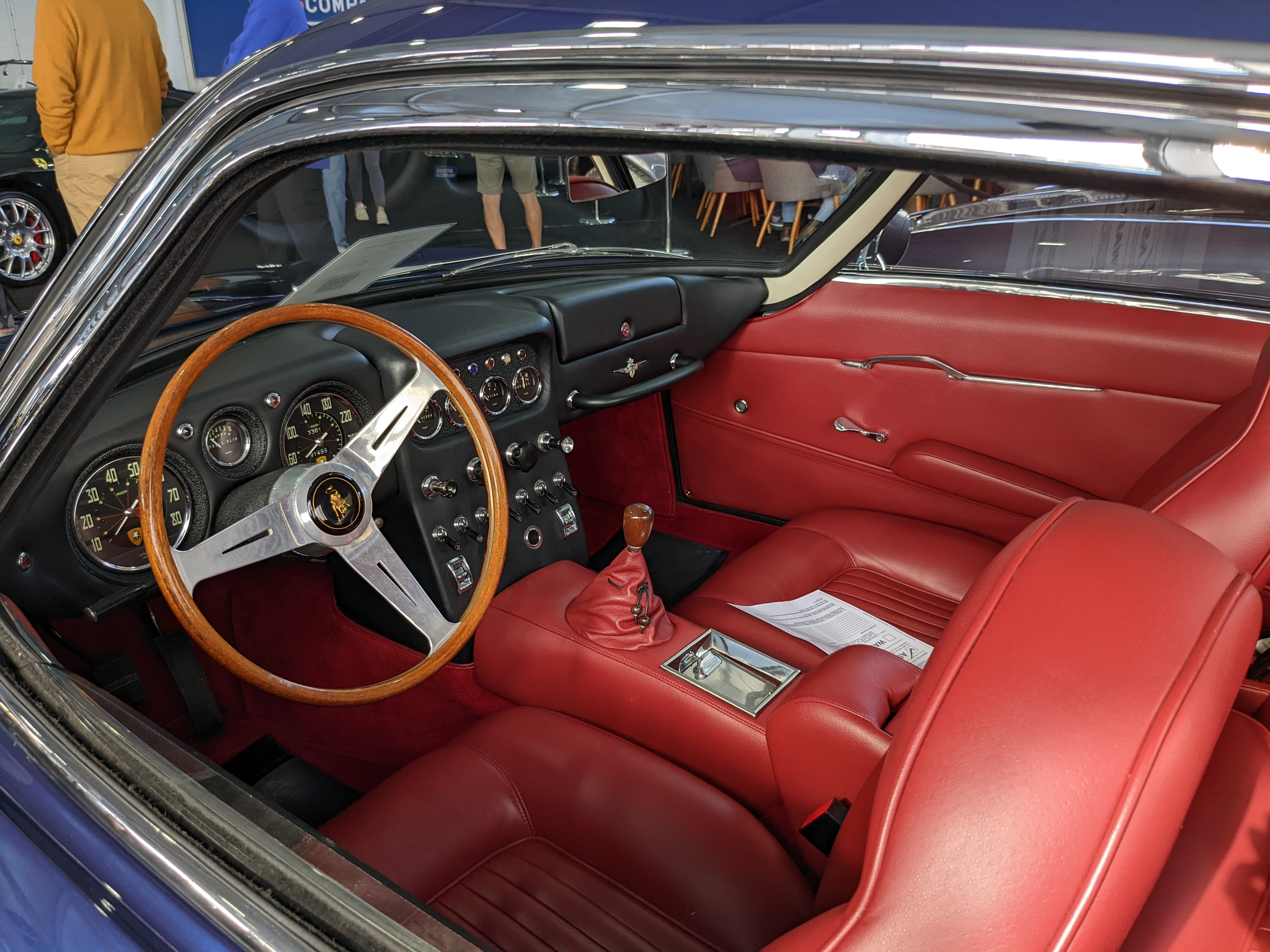
1965 Lamborghini 350 GT interior

The 350 GT shared a number of features with the 350 GTV prototype, including a four-wheel independent suspension, the quad-cam 3.5 litre Lamborghini V12, and an aluminium body. A number of mechanical revisions and refinements were made due to the suggestions of the Neri and Bonacini racing development shop and test driver Bob Wallace. The body was redesigned by Carrozzeria Touring, retaining the original profile while cleaning up details of the design to result in a more cohesive appearance. Most noticeable was the replacement of the prototype's rotating hidden headlights with fixed headlights.

As equipped to the 350 GTV, the Bizzarrini-designed 3.5 litre V12 was essentially a race motor, potentially developing 400 hp (294 kW) at 11,000 rpm. In order to fit his grand touring car with a smoother, more pleasant, longer-lasting engine that would be "good for 40,000 hard miles between services," Ferruccio had Dallara and Wallace de-tune a version of this prototype GTV motor for street use. This included:

- Replacing the elaborate and costly racing-style dry sump oiling system with a conventional wet sump system
- Reducing the compression ratio from 11.0:1 or above to 9.4:1
- Cutting back on the exotic materials specified for the crankshaft and other components to reduce cost
- Relocating the distributors to more accessible positions on the fronts of the exhaust camshafts
- Adoption of a single, very tall Lamborghini-made oil filter
- Replacing the expensive 36 mm down-draft racing Weber carburetors with conventional, less expensive side-draft 40 DCOE Webers. This resolved clearance problems seen in the GTV prototype and enabled the exceptionally low hood line Ferruccio desired.
- Softening the cam profiles for smoother running during street driving

This first "detuned" L350 engine was tested on October 3, 1963. The result—later fit in the 350 GT—was a 270 hp (199 kW) power plant that could reach 254 km/h (158 mph) in top.

While this 350 GT design work continued, the 350 GTV prototype was rushed to completion for the upcoming October 26 press meeting and the subsequent inauguration of the Turin Auto Show on the 30th. The 350 GTV was shown at the Turin Auto Show with the original Bizzarrini "racing" V-12 engine—with its downdraft Webers, rear distributors, etc.—displayed alongside as it was not "adapted to the chassis." The car was a static display with the suspension arms simply tack-welded in place and the engine not installed. Lukewarm reaction to the car caused Ferruccio Lamborghini to postpone plans for immediate production and move on to introducing Dallara's new 350 GT design.

In March 1964, only five months after the debut of the GTV in Turin, the "redesigned GTV"—now called the 350 GT—was debuted at the Geneva Auto Show. It was greeted with sufficient enthusiasm that Ferruccio decided to proceed with production in May 1964.

=== Manufacturing and assembly ===
The manufacture of the bodies was entrusted to Touring of Milan, who used their patented Superleggera method of construction to fix aluminium alloy panels directly to a tubular structure. The first 350 GT frame was fabricated by Neri and Bonacini, who continued to act as Lamborghini's chassis supplier until production of the 350 GT was underway, when the job was turned over to Marchesi. Chassis and bodies were mated at Touring, which then delivered the complete assemblies—with even the bumpers in place—to the Lamborghini factory. The cars could be ordered in several colours.

The first 350 GT chassis and body, delivered to the Lamborghini factory on March 9, 1964, was named No. 101 (Touring No. 17001). That same month No. 101 debuted at the Geneva show. The first customer delivery of a 350 GT was No. 104 (Touring No. 17004), delivered on July 31, 1964. No. 104 is displayed at the Sinsheim Technical Museum. Production increased slowly: despite the initial goal of building 10 cars a week, less than 25 cars were delivered to customers in 1964.

Lamborghini produced one hundred-twenty 350 GTs before replacing it with the Lamborghini 400 GT in 1966. Many 350 GTs were subsequently fitted with the larger 4.0 litre engine used in the 400 GT, in order to take advantage of the later engine's greater power and better replacement parts availability.

== Specifications ==
The 350 GT had an all-aluminium alloy V12 engine mated to a five-speed ZF manual transmission. It had an aluminium body, a Salisbury limited-slip differential, four-wheel independent suspension, and vacuum servo-assisted Girling disc brakes all round. The 350 GT was originally fitted with Pirelli Cinturato HS 205-section tyres.

It had a wheelbase of 2,550 millimetres (100.4 in), with a front and rear axle track of 1,380 millimetres (54.3 in). It measured 4,640 millimetres (182.7 in) long by 1,730 millimetres (68.1 in) wide and was 1,220 millimetres (48.0 in) high. With its kerb weight of 1,450 kilograms (3,197 lb), the 350 GT could accelerate from 0 to 100 km/h (0 to 62 mph) in 6.8 seconds, and from 0 to 100 mph (0 to 161 km/h) in 16.3 seconds, and go on to reach a top speed of 254 km/h (158 mph).

=== Chassis ===
As was the case with the motor, Bizzarrini's GTV "racing" chassis design was the basis of Dallara's 350 GT "street" chassis. The GTV chassis was unsuitable for a street car due to its lightweight construction and small door openings obstructed by tubing. Dallara's redesign for the production 350 GT used larger 60 mm (2.4 in) square-section steel tubing in a central "floor", with front and rear cradles made from 50 mm (2.0 in) and 25 mm (0.98 in) tubing to support the engine, rear differential and suspension mountings. This design provided easy entry and exit through the doors, aided in the quietness of the car, and provided a solid platform on which to mount the body.

=== Suspension ===
The suspension was fully independent, with unequal-length wishbones and coilover shock absorbers. In the rear, the coilover assembly was located to the rear of the suspension wishbone mountings. The rear suspension wishbones were asymmetrical front-to-back, with an offset that brought the rear wheel hubs towards the spring mountings. This arrangement provided increased resistance to torsion and improved stability during acceleration and braking. Anti-roll bars were equipped on front and rear.

=== Engine ===
Quality control of the early 3.5 L (3,464 cc) engines was very high. Each one underwent tests for 24 hours on a Schenk Walge dynamometer, being run for the first 12 hours under electric power, and then with gasoline at increasing speeds, producing 280 hp (206 kW) at 6500 rpm and 325 N⋅m (240 lbf⋅ft) of torque at 4500 rpm. A detailed analysis was made of its behaviour before installation in the car for at least 500 kilometres of mixed-test running by Wallace.

== 350 GTS ==
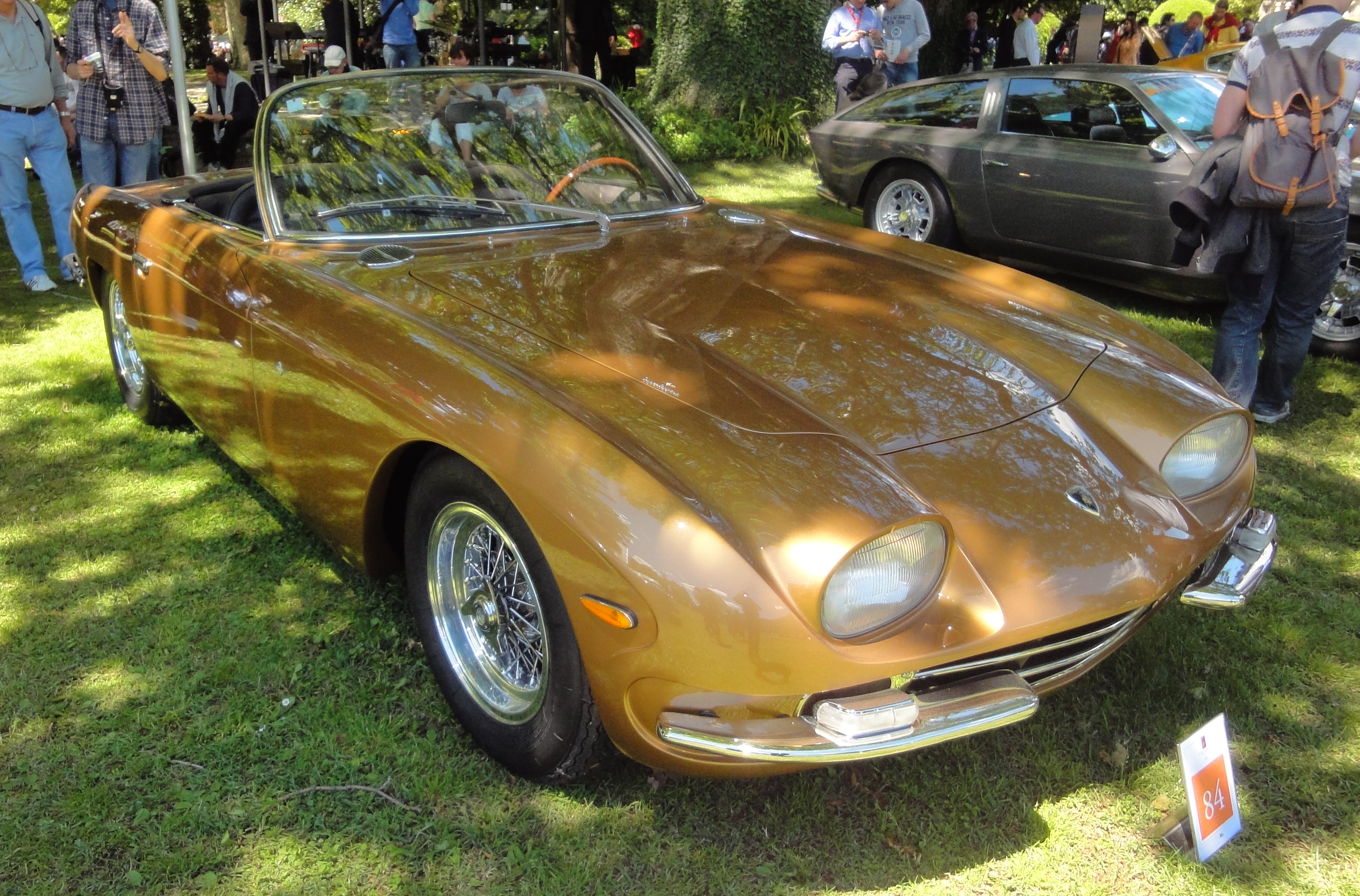
350 GTS chassis no. 0325 shown at the 2013 Concorso d'Eleganza Villa d'Este

The Lamborghini 350 GTS was a convertible-roof spider version of the 350 GT, first shown at the November 1965 Turin Auto Show. Two were constructed by Carrozzeria Touring in 1965. When folded down, the convertible top was designed to be concealed in the storage area behind the two seats. Of the two originally built, chassis 0328 was finished in black with an emerald green interior, while chassis 0325 was painted gold with a brown interior.

== 3500 GTZ ==
The Lamborghini 3500 GTZ was designed by Ercole Spada and built by Zagato. It used a shortened Lamborghini 350 GT chassis. Two cars were built in total: chassis number 0310 and 0320. Chassis number 0310 was shown at the 1965 London Motor Show and was sold to Lamborghini’s official agent in Milan. This car was then sent to Australia where it was converted to a RHD configuration. In 2006 this car was purchased by a European collector who converted the car back to a LHD configuration. The visual design of the GTZ was similar to Zagato’s Alfa Romeo TZ2.

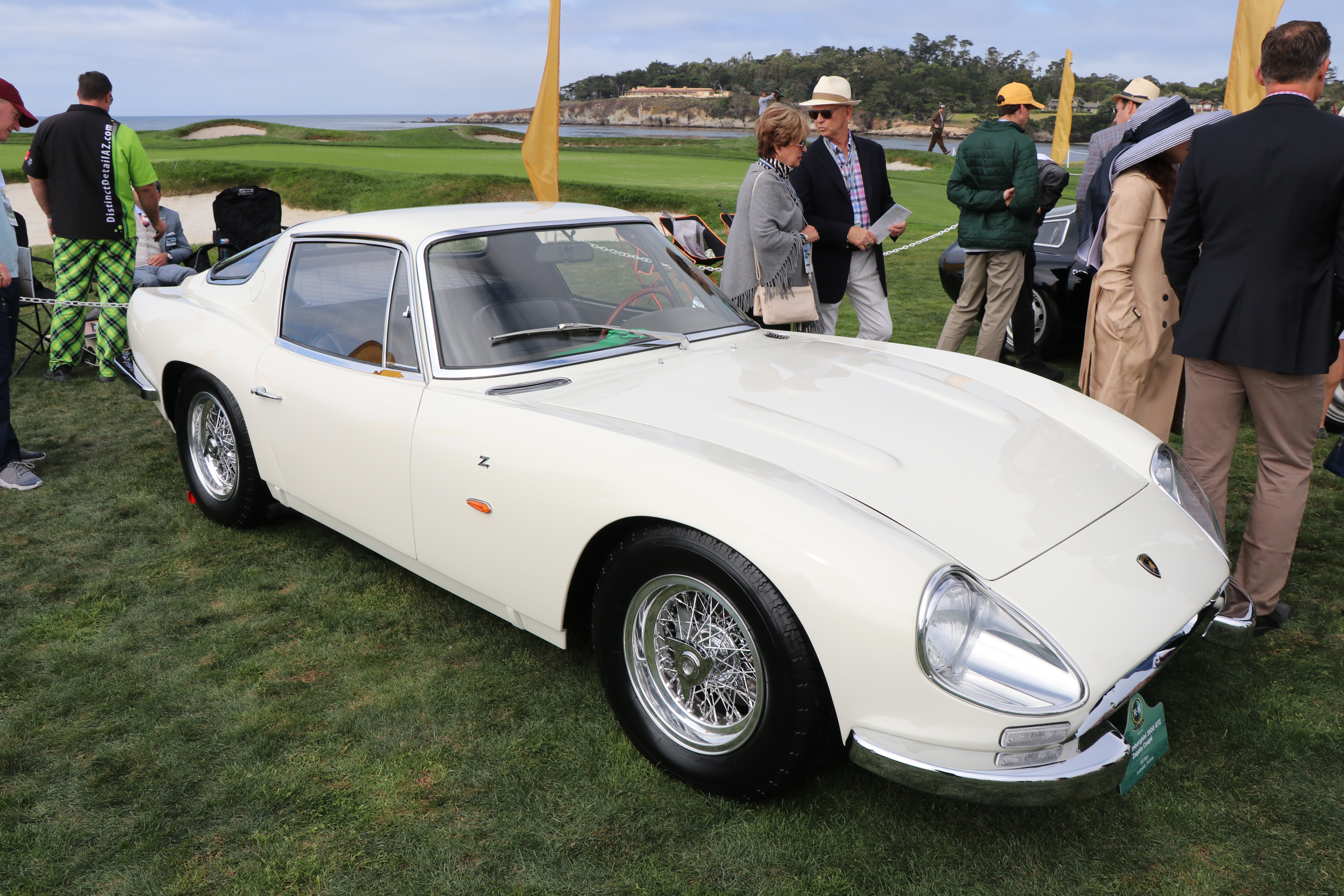
Lamborghini 3500 GTZ chassis number 0310

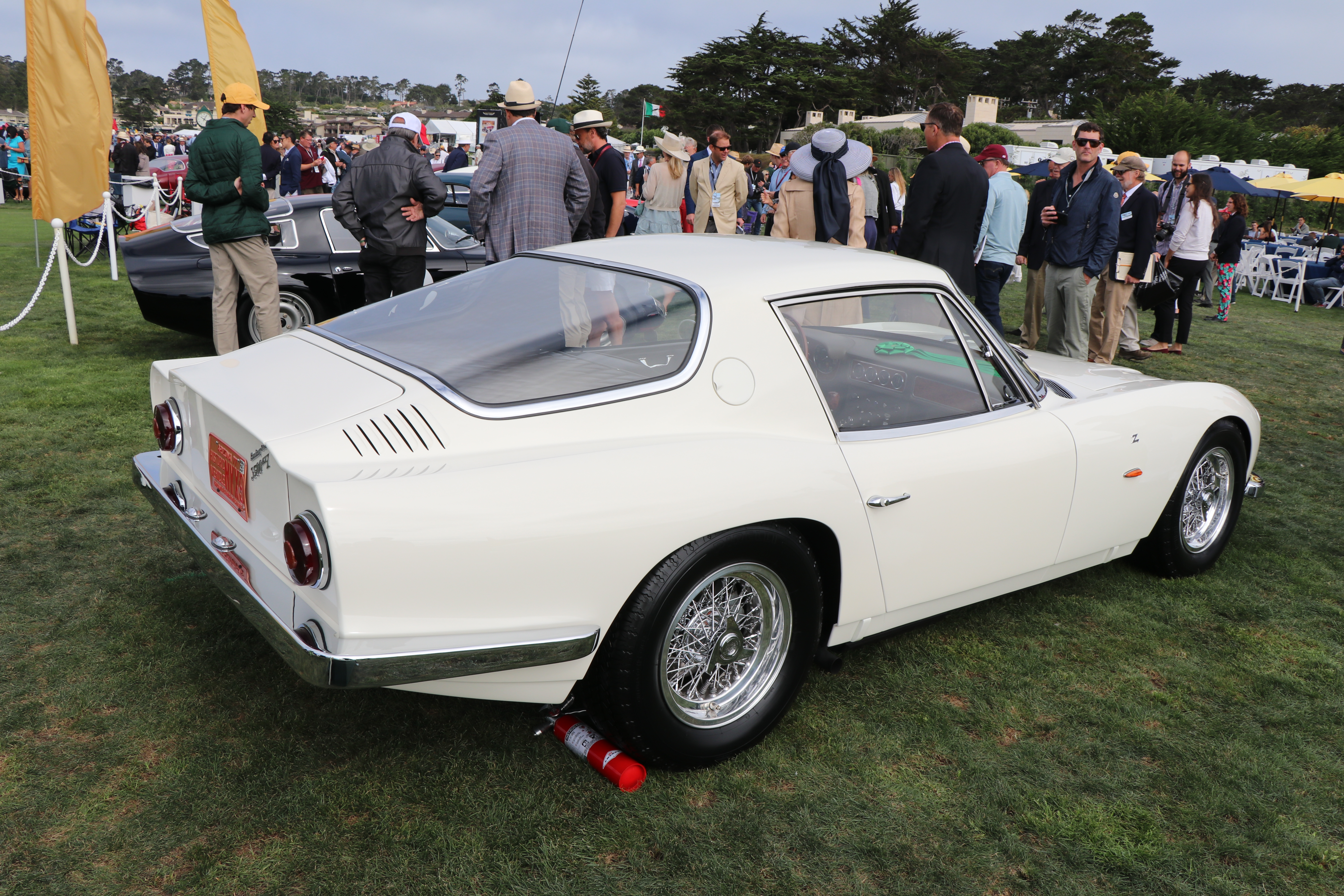
