= Neri and Bonacini =

- Type: Private
- Industry: Automotive
- Founded: 1959; 67 years ago (approximate) in Modena, Italy
- Founder: Giorgio Neri; Luciano Bonacini
- Defunct: 1967 (approximate)
- Fate: Dissolved
- Headquarters: Modena, Italy
- Services: Coachbuilder; Auto Mechanics

Neri and Bonacini, also known as Nembo, was a small carrozzeria and mechanic shop based in Modena, Italy, active from the late 1950s to around 1967. Founded and run by Giorgio Neri and Luciano Bonacini, the shop worked on and produced bodies for Ferrari, Lamborghini and Maserati road and race cars, both in an official capacity for those manufacturers and for private owners. Their best known projects are the Ferrari 250 GT-based Nembo spiders (built in collaboration with Tom Meade) and the Lamborghini 400GT Monza. Neri and Bonacini also designed a car under their own name, the Neri and Bonacini Studio GT Due Litri. Two prototypes of this car were made between 1966 and 1968 but it never entered series production. The shop closed around 1967 when Bonacini went to work for De Tomaso and Neri started his own shop, Motors-World-Machines (MWM).

The nickname of the firm, "Nembo," was invented by Tom Meade because it was a convenient contraction of the proprietors' names and because it evoked the Nembo Kid, an Italian comic book version of Superman.

== Racing cars ==
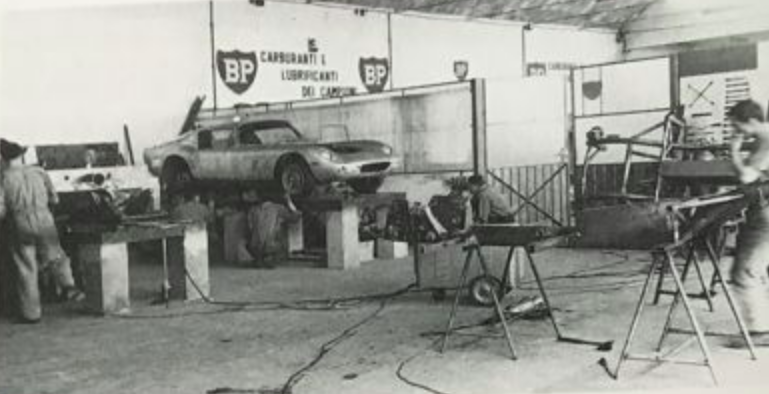
Neri and Bonacini workshop in September 1963. An ASA 1000 GTC is visible on the lift at center of image.

Neri and Bonacini were employed by the Maserati factory racing program as mechanics and body fabricators. Following the closure of Maserati's racing program in the late 1950s, they began maintaining customer-owned Maserati racing cars through their own independent firm. They also took commissions for modifying racing and road cars from other manufacturers such as Ferrari, Iso and ASA, only some of which are well documented. Neri and Bonacini were involved in the construction of at least one Bizzarrini P538.

=== Ferrari 250 GT SWB Breadvan ===
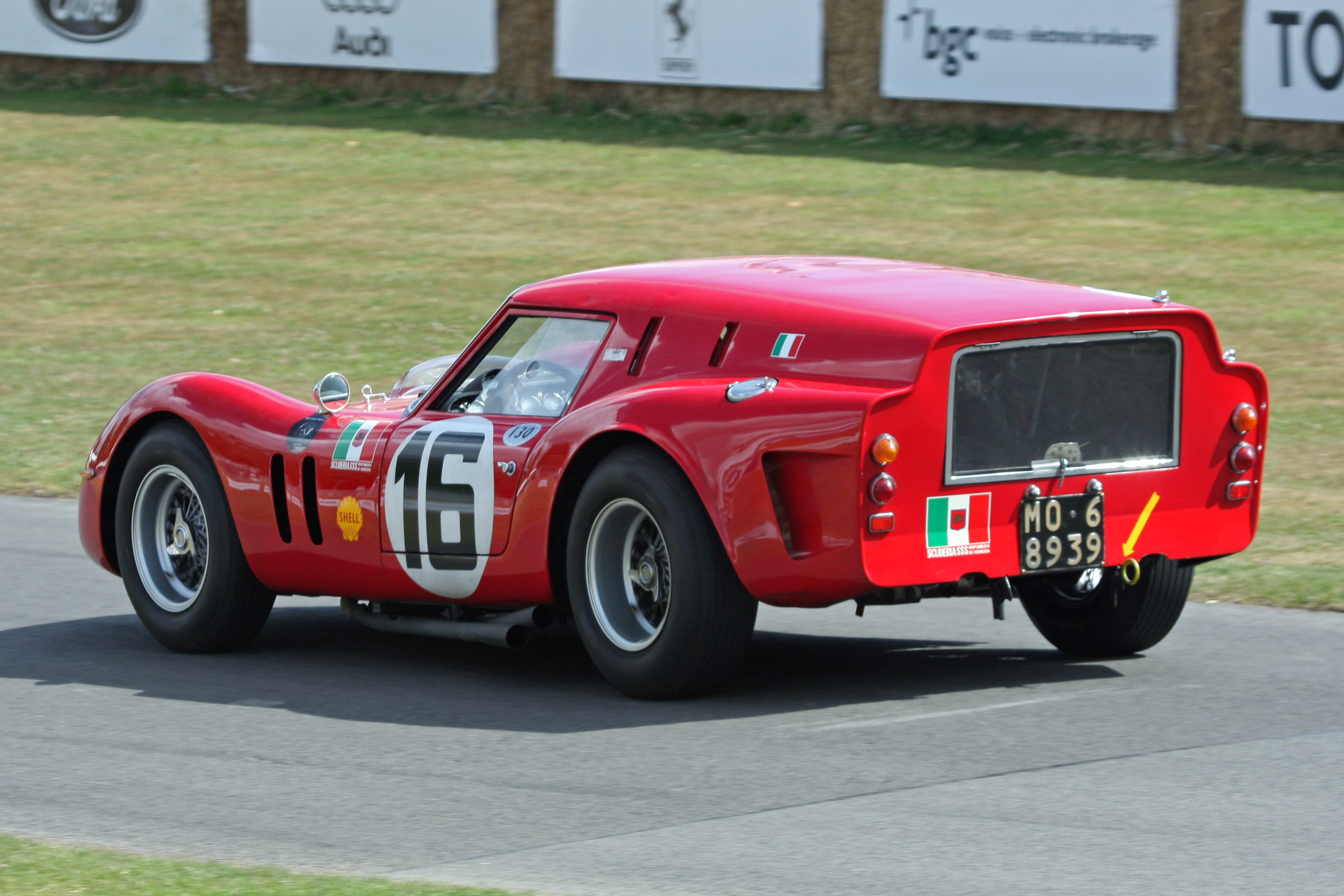
1961 Ferrari 250 GT SWB Breadvan

Neri and Bonacini assisted in the production of the 1962 Ferrari 250 GT SWB Breadvan, designed by Giotto Bizzarrini for Count Giovanni Volpi's Scuderia Serenissima. Neri and Bonacini performed the mechanical modifications of the donor 250 GT, while the new body was created by Piero Drogo's Carrozzeria Sports Cars. They also mechanically modified two additional competition Ferrari 250 SWBs (S/N 2053 GT and 2735 GT) rebodied for privateer racing drivers by Bizzarrini and Drogo, with designs inspired by the Breadvan.

=== Iso Daytona ===
The Iso Daytona or Iso Nembo was designed by Giotto Bizzarrini and Renzo Rivolta as a racing car that could also be adapted for street use. It used an American V8 engine in a front-engine, rear-wheel-drive layout, a lightweight aluminum body, independent front suspension and rear de Dion axle. After Bizzarrini left Iso in 1965, Neri and Bonacini were contracted to complete the unfinished design and build prototype bodies. The prototype was displayed to the public at the 1966 Italian Grand Prix at Monza. As many as 5 Iso Daytonas were built and details around their production history and specifications are unclear. One car of this type was showcased in the August 1966 issue of Road and Track, under the name "Nembo II." The magazine represented this car as derived from Bizzarrini's Iso Grifo and 5300 GT designs but does not mention any official connection with Iso.

An Iso Strale Daytona 6000GT prototype sold at RM Sotheby's 2010 Monterey auction for $522,500, including buyer's fee. According to the RM Catalogue, this car was based on a crashed Iso Rivolta and was commissioned by Carlo Bernasconi of Milan, who directed Neri and Bonacini to rebody the car with his own design. The relationship between this car and the Bizzarrini/Rivolta Daytona design is unclear.

A possible precursor to the Iso Daytona was the 1965 Bizzarrini "Nembo," featured in the May 1966 Road & Track issue. Designed by Bizzarrini and finished by Neri and Bonacini, it was nearly identical to an Iso Grifo but used a 7-liter Holman Moody-prepared Ford V8 engine. The subsequent history of this car is unknown.

== Road cars ==
=== Ferrari Nembo ===
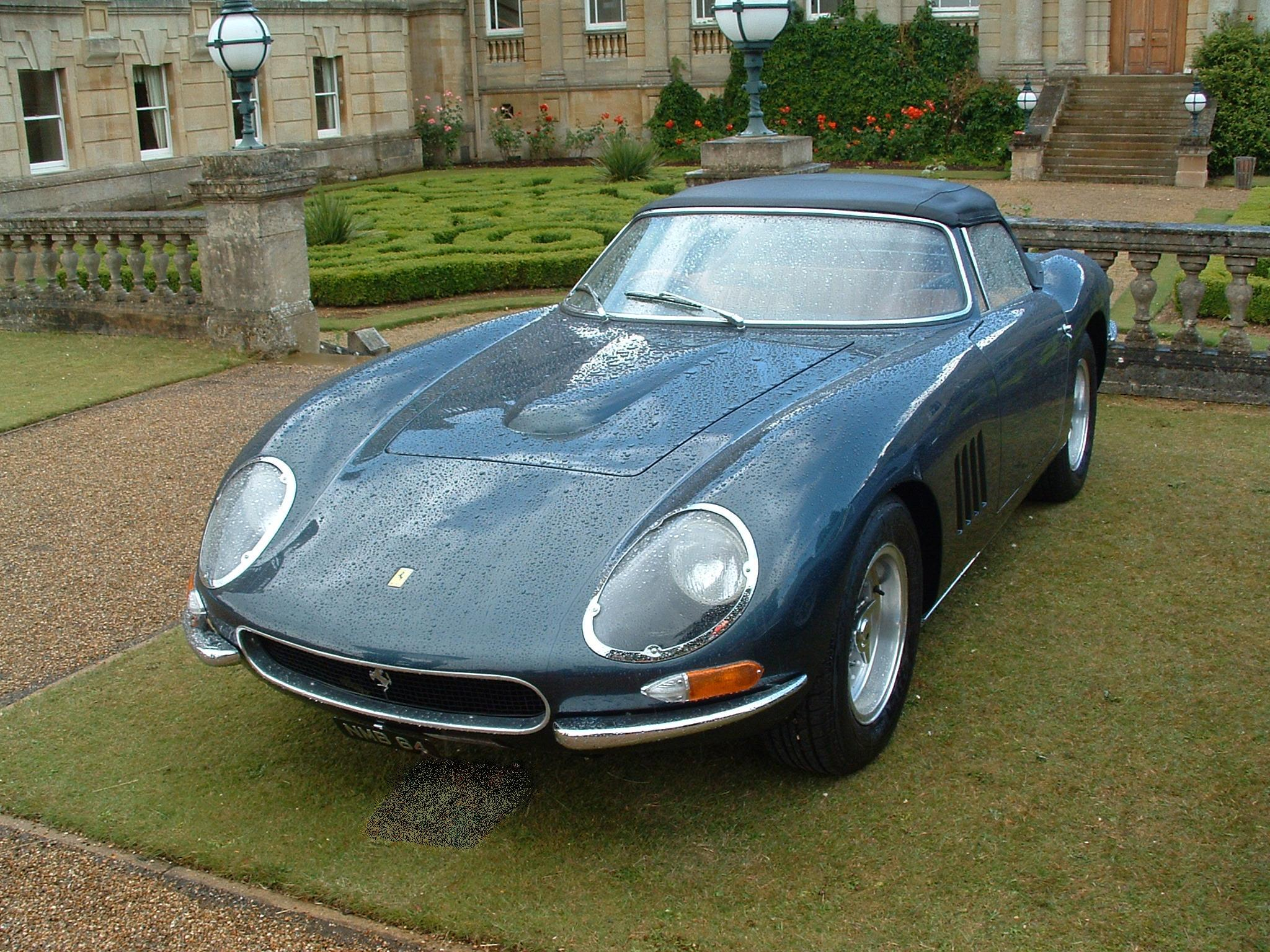
Ferrari 330GT Nembo, rebodied by Giorgio Neri in a style similar to the early 250 Nembo spyders

The Ferrari Nembo cars were a series of rebodied Ferrari sports cars built by Neri and Bonacini in collaboration with American designer Tom Meade. Three Nembo spyders and one Nembo coupe were built, all based on 250 GT chassis and engines. Like all Neri and Bonacini-bodied cars, they were individually hand-built and differed in many details.

The first Nembo spyder used a 1960 250 GT Coupé donor car (chassis 1777GT) and was built in 1965 for Meade's customer Sergio Braidi. Bradi wanted an open spyder-bodied car inspired by the 1964 series II 250 GTO, and initially proposed using a GTO chassis. Meade convinced Bradi to use the longer 250 GT chassis as he believed the extra length would result in a more harmonious design. The final steel bodywork was reminiscent of both the Series II 250 GTO and the 275 GTB/4 NART Spyder. The car was originally painted a very dark blue, almost black.

Immediately following completion of the first Nembo spyder, a Nembo coupe was constructed using a 1959 250 GT PF Coupe donor (chassis 1623GT). The aluminum notchback body somewhat resembled a 1964 250 GTO, due in part to using a windshield from this model. The body was primarily designed by Neri and Bonacini, rather than Meade, as Meade disagreed with the shop over their preference for a notchback body instead of his design for a fastback. The completed car was originally painted red, very close to the standard Ferrari color "Rosso Chiaro."

The second Nembo spyder was built during 1967–68, based on a wrecked 250 GT SWB (chassis 3771GT). This car was commissioned by Bill Dixon, who asked Tom Meade to replicate the appearance of the first Nembo spyder. The body was again built by Neri and Bonacini, although the two ended their business partnership while the car was in progress. Although designed similarly to the first Nembo spyder, there were differences in body work mandated by the shorter wheelbase of the donor chassis. A removable hardtop was also provided. Meade equipped the car with then-new Weber 40 DCN carburetors, which required significant tweaking to run well for street use. This car was originally painted in a dark burgundy color.

Fabrication of a third Nembo spyder was begun concurrently with the second one. It was based on a 250 GTE 2+2 chassis (number 2707GT). The body of this car differed from previous Nembo spyders, with a "sharknose" like the 156 F1 and a rounded tail like the 250 GT SWB. This car was ordered by a customer in Lebanon through a dealer in Paris. The car was never completed but was shipped to Lebanon as an unfinished body and chassis at the request of the dealer. Ferrari Classiche has confirmed the authenticity of the 2707GT in 2019 and had added a "Classiche" stamp to the chassis, to clearly differentiate it from other replicas (one of such replicas is supposedly a Drogo). The car is still in Tom Meade's estate and is currently undergoing restoration.

In the early 1990s, a customer commissioned Giorgio Neri to rebody a 330 GT 2+2 (chassis number 5805GT) in the style of the earlier 250 Nembo spyders. The project was finally completed in 1998 and is sometimes considered another Nembo spyder.

=== Lamborghini and the 400GT Monza ===
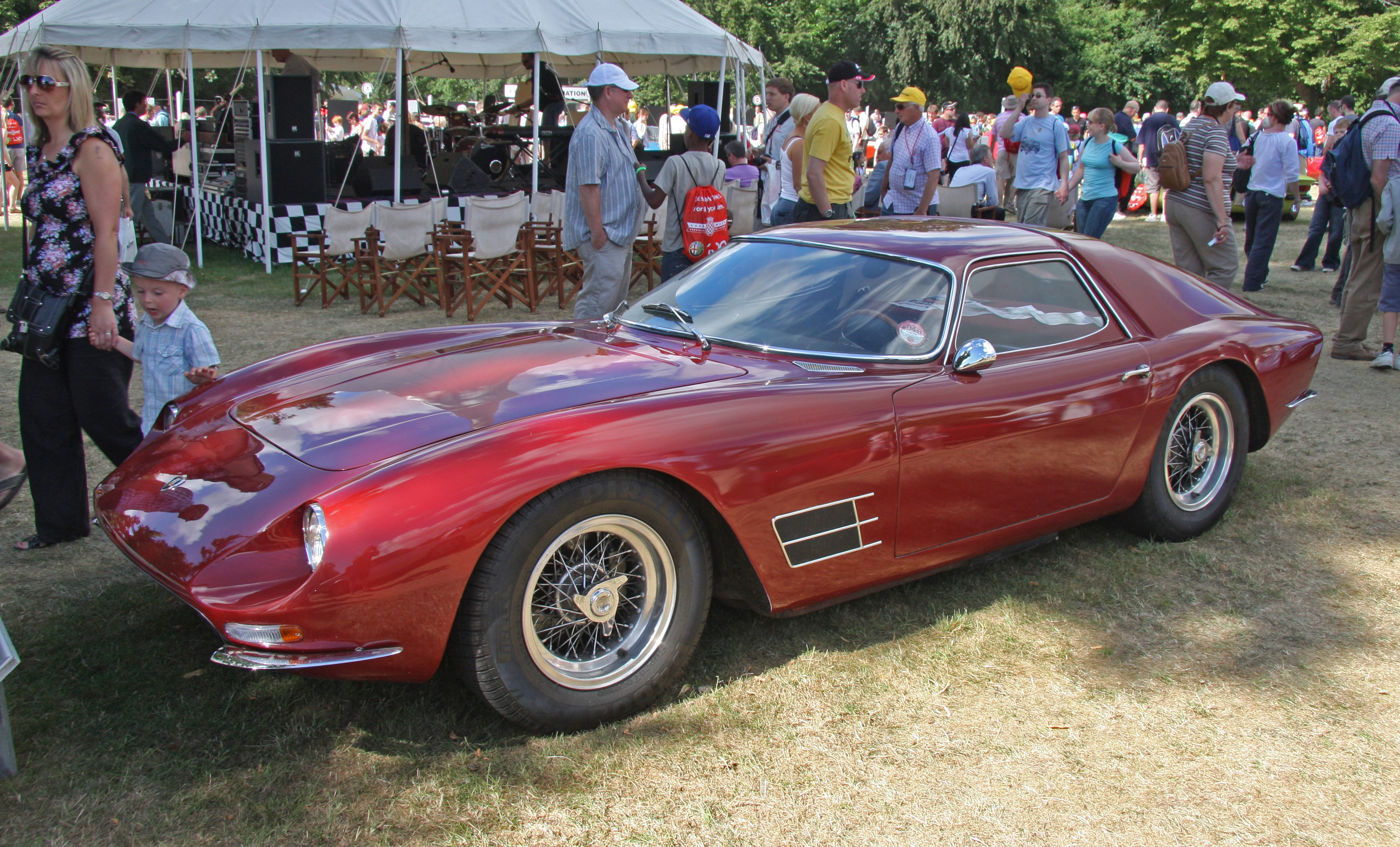
1966 Lamborghini 400 GT Monza

Neri and Bonacini were contracted by Lamborghini in 1963 to build the chassis for the first Lamborghini prototype, the 350 GTV. This chassis was constructed from square and round section steel tubing and was relatively light and rigid by contemporary standards. Once Lamborghini began series production of the 350 GT, Neri and Bonacini continued to supply chassis, which were then bodied by Carrozzeria Touring. As production increased, this task was contracted instead to the firm of Marchesi.

Through this pre-existing relationship with Lamborghini, Neri and Bonacini were commissioned to create a one-off two-seater sports car based on a 350 GT chassis (number 01030) and a 400 GT V-12 engine. Possibly built for an unknown American client to race at the 24 Hours of Le Mans, the car was completed in August 1966 and named the 400 GT Monza. The aluminum body was hand built in the Neri and Bonacini shop and went through many revisions during the fabrication process. The final result shows visual similarities to other Italian sports cars such as the Bizzarrini 5300 GT and the Lamborghini Miura, with a long hood and Kamm tail.

The 400 GT Monza never raced at Le Mans, possibly due to homologation problems. It was displayed at the 1967 Barcelona Motor Show on the Lamborghini importer Amato's stand. A wealthy Spaniard purchased it at the show and the 400GT Monza remained in his family until 2005, when it was sold at Bonhams' December 2005 auction in London for £177,500 GBP.

=== Studio GT Due Litri ===
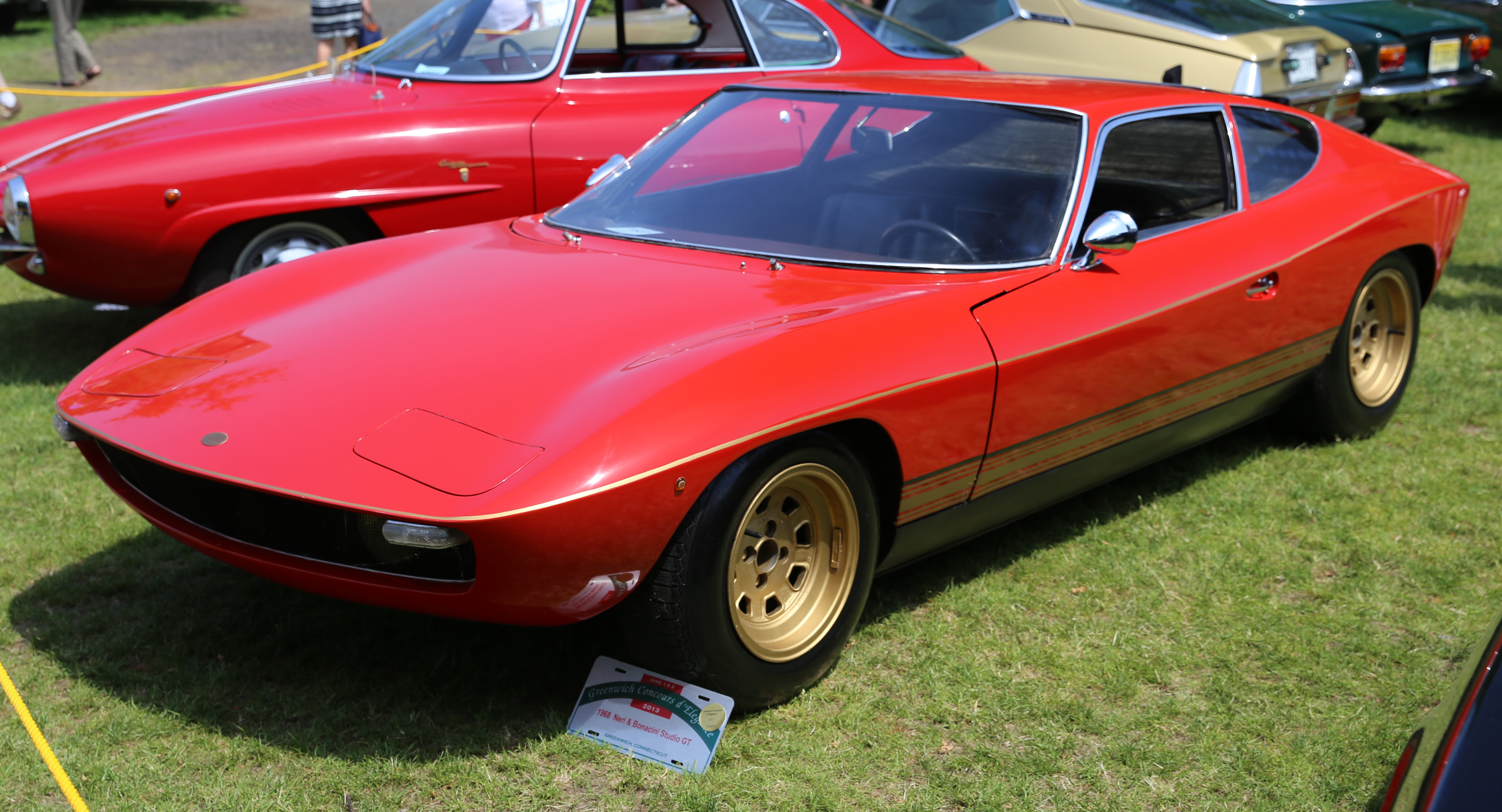
1968 Studio GT Due Litre front view

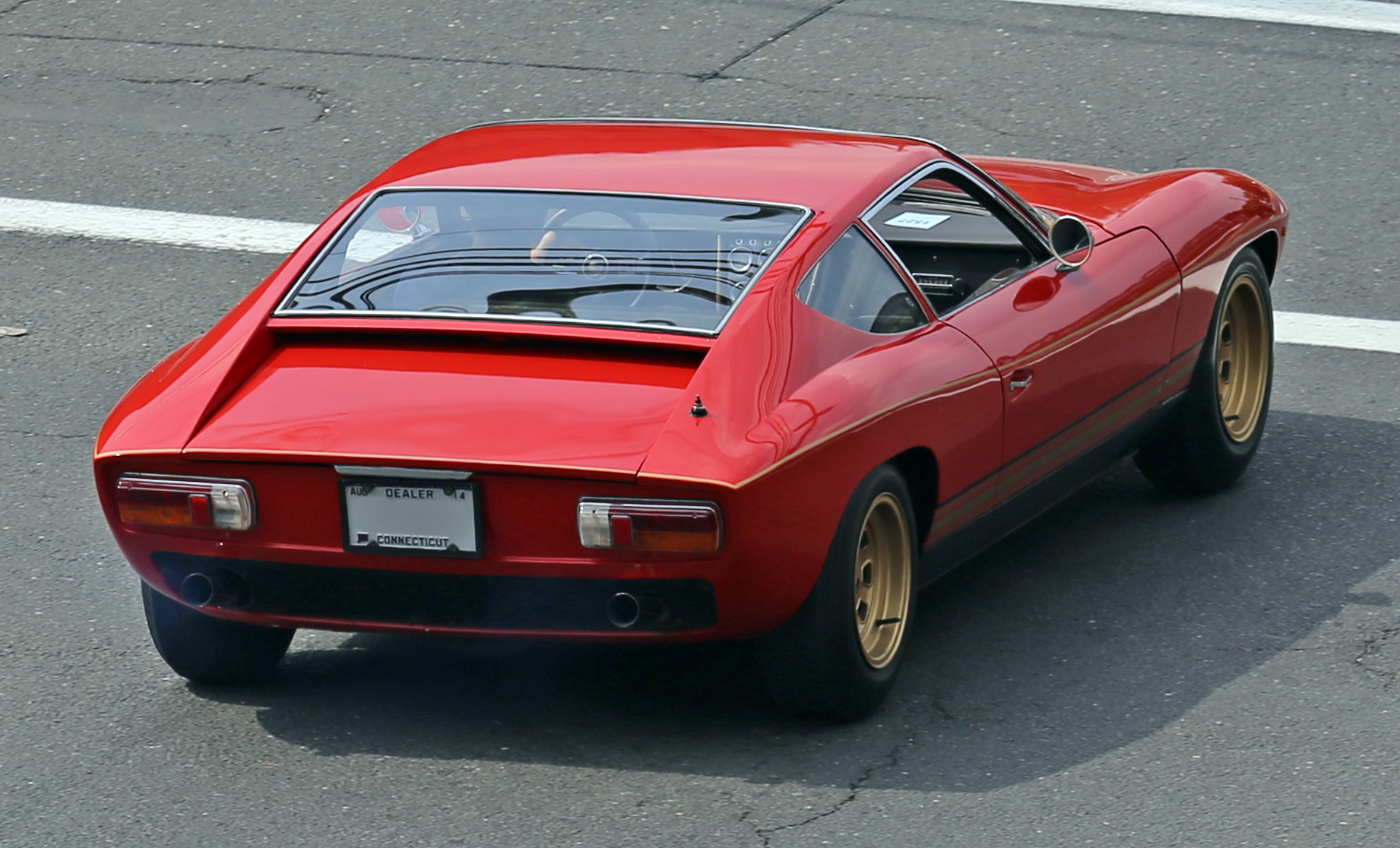
1968 Studio GT Due Litre rear view

In 1966, Neri and Bonacini decided to produce a road car under their own name. The result was the Studio GT Due Litre, a rear mid-engine rear-wheel-drive two-seater coupe sports car with an aluminum body of their own design.

The Studio GT chassis was produced in-house and incorporated a central sheet metal tub, steel tube subframes at the front and rear and an original suspension design. Wheelbase measured 92 inches, overall height was 42 inches, and track was 53 inches at the front and 52.5 at the rear. As the Studio GT was intended to be a grand tourer, it had a fully trimmed and soundproofed interior. The body was a compact and sleek fastback, with pop-up headlights on the final version and rear bodywork visually similar to that of the Lamborghini Miura. The car was designed around a 1.8 litre Lancia Flavia flat-4 engine, but a Ford Taunus V4 and an ATS V8 engine were also installed in prototypes for testing purposes as availability of the Lancia engine for series production was uncertain.

Neri and Bonacini produced two prototypes between 1966 and 1968. During this period their partnership ended and Giorgio Neri independently searched for an investor interested in purchasing the second prototype and all tooling and designs for production purposes. Neri was unsuccessful and the car never entered mass production.
