= Tom Meade =

American automotive designer and dealer

- Born: Thomas Gabriel Meade; 19 January 1939; Hollywood, California, US
- Died: 1 August 2013 (aged 74); Los Angeles, California, US
- Occupation: Automobile designer
- Years active: 1961–early 1970s
- Notable work: Thomassima Ferraris
- Children: 1

Thomas Gabriel Meade (19 January 1939 – 1 August 2013) was an American automobile designer and dealer best known for his Thomassima series of custom cars based on Ferrari engines and chassis. He was based in Modena, Italy from the early 1960s through the early 1970s, where he met and collaborated with many Modenese carrozzerie, manufacturers and mechanics.

== Biography ==
=== Early life ===
Thomas Gabriel Meade was born in Hollywood on 19 January 1939, to a single mother. He spent his youth with her in Australia and Honolulu, Hawaii. When he reached the high school age, they moved in Newport Beach, California. He graduated at 17 and enrolled in the U.S. Navy where he was trained as an avionic engineer, until his leave in 1960.

One day, during his walk home from work in Costa Mesa, he spotted through the open door of a garage the back of a 1957 Ferrari 500 TRC, calling it the most beautiful car he had ever seen. The owner initially tried to sell the car to Meade for a disproportionate amount with no avail; then he revealed to have bought the car in Rome, Italy, where there was a warehouse full of old racecars for sale at a low price.
Fascinated, Meade decided on impulse that he would put his hands on one of those cars at any cost. In the autumn of 1960, he left home with only $50 and hitchhiked to New Orleans where he signed on to a freighter heading for Stavanger, Norway, as steward's assistant. Once he arrived, he crossed Europe and made his way to Italy.

=== Life in Italy ===
Once in Rome, Meade found a job as an extra in Dino De Laurentiis’ 1961 film The Best of Enemies: he played a background English officer at night, and fruitlessly searched for the fabled warehouse during the day. In the end, he realized that the warehouse was only a myth and thus left Rome for Modena, where the headquarters of Ferrari and Maserati were located.

Meade had no contacts in Modena and no money for lodging, sleeping outdoors when he first arrived. Shortly after his arrival, he visited the Maserati factory during the evening, after operations closed for the day. By chance, engineer Aurelio Bertocchi, the son of Maserati race director Guerino Bertocchi, was working late and gave Meade a factory tour, thinking Meade was a potential customer for a new Maserati 3500 GT. During the tour, Meade spotted a retired racing car in storage at the factory, a Maserati 350S, chassis 3503. Meade made a deal with Bertocchi to purchase the car for $420. It was missing an engine and needed body repairs. Through Bertocchi, Meade made contact with the shops of Neri and Bonacini and Medardo Fantuzzi, in order to find repair facilities. Meade met Lloyd "Lucky" Casner of the Camoradi racing team while visiting the Maserati factory, and was subsequently able to purchase a Chevy V8 engine from him. This engine originated from an Arkus-Duntov engineered racing Corvette that was wrecked by Camoradi team mechanic Bob Wallace. Meade and his collaborators rebuilt the 350S with the Chevy engine and customized the body with a removable hard top. Meade shipped the car to San Francisco in 1962, where it was subsequently crashed by an associate and sold for $2700.

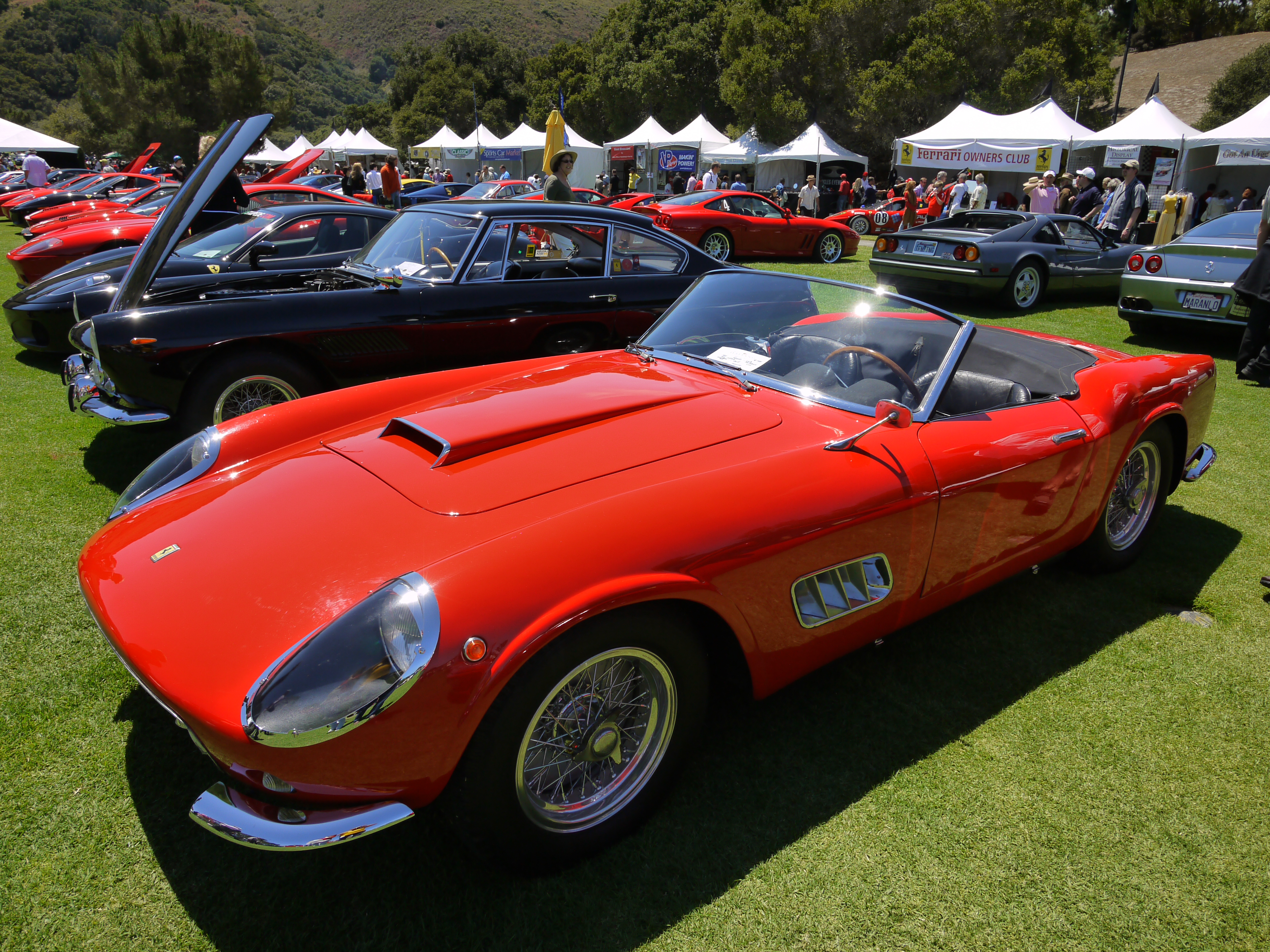
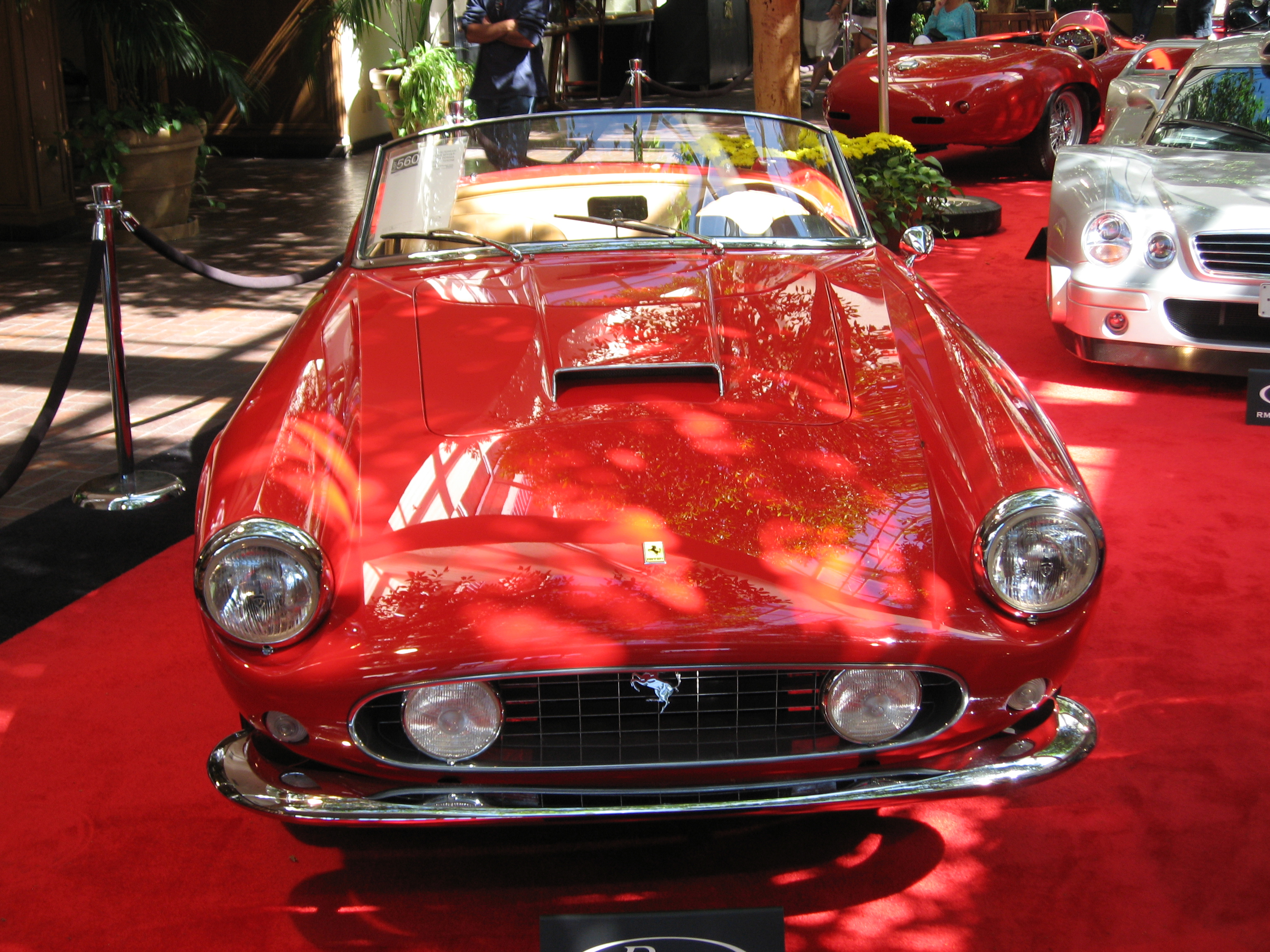
A 1959 Ferrari 250 GT California Spyder (chassis #1425GT) whose nose had been modified by Meade (above). The original car was not dissimilar to the one below (chassis #1451GT)

This first project allowed Meade to establish a network of contacts in Modena that would allow his future projects of rebuilding, customizing and dealing cars. In addition to Bertocchi, Neri, Bonacini and Fantuzzi, Meade's contacts included Piero Drogo, David Piper, Alejandro de Tomaso, Count Giovanni Volpi, Road & Track journalist Peter Coltrin and Carroll Shelby. Meade took up residence in the Carrozzeria Fantuzzi workshop and took instruction in hand-forming and repairing bodywork from Medardo Fantuzzi. He briefly left Italy in 1962, returning in 1963 whereupon he began renting an apartment and garage adjacent to the Aerautodromo di Modena. Soon after, Meade began buying and selling a higher volume of cars, including many which were exported to the United States. These included another Maserati 350S, a Maserati Tipo 63, Ferrari 250 GTOs, a 330 P3, a 250 LM, a 250 GT SWB, 250 GT Lussos and others. Meade's customers included Richard Merritt (founder of the Ferrari Club of America) and Los Angeles–based Ferrari importer Edwin K. Niles. During this period from 1963 to approximately 1970, Meade constructed his Thomassima series and several other projects based on various chassis and engines. At one point during this time, Meade shared a storage space with David Piper's racing team. By 1970, Meade established a business in Modena under the name "Tom Meade's Used Sports Car Center of Italy," where in addition to buying, selling, rebuilding and customizing used cars, he sold and manufactured spare parts and accessories with an emphasis on selling to overseas customers.

During the early 1970s, multiple circumstances coincided to end Meade's business in Modena. Due to the 1973 oil crisis demand for sports cars was lower, while increasing safety regulations, speed limits and changing public opinion further limited the market for Meade's cars. Meade also claimed that his Modenese collaborators were discouraged from working with him, as established interests in the region believed he was getting too much publicity. Meade left Modena and briefly opened a restoration shop in Milan, where he became friends with former Ferrari engineer Carlo Chiti.

Meade left Italy at some point during the 1970s, storing the cars and parts he had accumulated for his business in a warehouse near Lake Como.

=== Later life ===
After leaving Italy, Meade spent approximately two decades traveling in Asia. In 1993, Meade returned to Los Angeles in order to take care of his mother. He began planning the construction of a Thomassima IV (sometimes styled Thomassima IIII), which was to have a carbon fiber body and a Ferrari 333 SP engine.

Meade died on 1 August 2013. His estate is maintained by his adopted son, who works in the luxury goods industry.

== Works ==
=== Thomassima series ===
Once he gathered enough parts and experience, Meade began to conceive cars based entirely on his own design. He christened this car series "Thomassima", a contraction of his first name and massima, the Italian feminine form of the English "maximum", meaning that these were his ultimate works.

The first full-body, Meade-made car was based on a Ferrari 250 GT and finished in 1964. Meade made the car more aggressive with a longer and lower snout, gill-like vents behind all wheels, and a roof consisting in a straight line sloping from the windshield to the car tail. This car was destroyed in the 1966 flood of the Arno in Florence where it was being exhibited. Nevertheless, it was influential on later Meade cars, with a source retroactively – and unofficially – calling it the Thomassima Zero. (Note: Some sources incorrectly calls this car the actual Thomassima I, making it the car which was lost in Florence)

The Thomassima I was made under the request of an unknown Swiss baron who sought a replacement for his Corvette in order to remain competitive against the Shelby Cobras. Meade based this "anti-Cobra" on a Ferrari 250 GT chassis fitted with a powerful Chevrolet V8 engine in its front, and covered with a heavily altered bodywork which included gullwings that could have been removed and put into the car trunk, an idea which Meade considered unprecedented at the time.

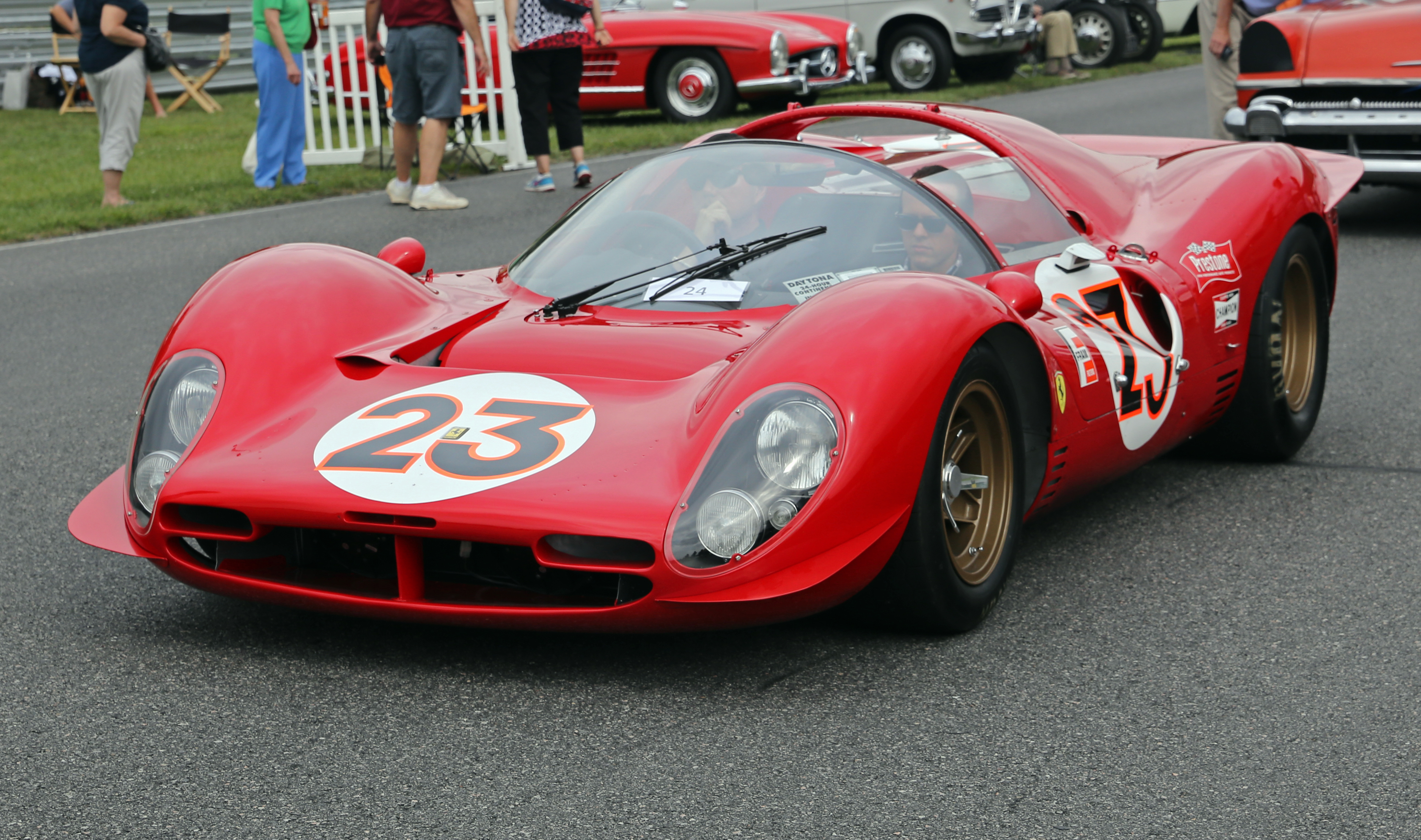
The Ferrari 330 P3/P4. Meade's Thomassima II was his idea of how this Ferrari should have looked like

The Thomassima II (Note: Some older sources incorrectly calls this car the first Thomassima built.) was requested in late 1966 by Harry Windsor from Los Gatos, California. Windsor wanted a mid-engine car resembling the Ferrari 330 P3 or P4. Meade then proceeded to create his idea of how the P3/P4 should have looked like, but it proved very challenging.
He had to radically modify the frame of a Cooper T43 Formula One car, and fitting it with a Ferrari 250 GT Colombo V12 engine coupled to a 4-speed ZF gearbox. For the bodywork, Meade was greatly helped by Piero Drogo of Carrozzeria Sports Cars. The final result was ready in the 1967, and was a little longer and more muscular car than a P4, weighing less than 2,000 pounds (910 kg) and sporting 240 horsepower (180 kW), with a detachable hardtop.
The Thomassima II was shipped to California, where Windsor rebranded it as a "Ferrari 250 P/4 Roadster" and exhibited it at the 1968 Pebble Beach Concours d'Elegance where it won a class award. Despite the fact that it was improperly called a Ferrari, the Thomassima II made Meade a well known figure in his field. In 1971 the car made a cameo appearance in George Lucas’ directorial debut film THX 1138. In later times the car was crashed, then purchased in the early 1980s by Larry Hatfield and later restored. It starred at the 2015 Concorso Italiano at Monterey. As of December 2016, the car is still in Hatfield's possession.

The Thomassima III was not built before 1968, and its completion required over a year of work. The donor car was a 1958 Ferrari 250 GT Pininfarina Coupé (chassis number 1065GT) powered by a 3L V12 engine. The gearbox was replaced with a 5-speed ZF and the brakes were upgraded. The bodywork was altered dramatically, even further than the earlier "Thomassima Zero", resulting in an extremely low, muscular, front-engined coupe featuring gullwings, twisted exhausts on both sides and centerlock wheels. Interiors were lavish, with a cast-steel steering wheel. Meade claimed to have put a particular emphasis into the finish. The car was branded Tom Meade Modena Italy with a standing goat as its logo.
The Thomassima III was the car that brought Meade the most fame, and he often used it for promoting himself. He considered it his masterpiece and decided not to sell it to anyone. In December 1970 it was featured on Road & Track, appeared on Italian TV, 60 Minutes and on Walter Cronkite's talk show, won awards in car shows in Italy and the U.S., and became a Hot Wheels scale model. Prior to Meade's departure from Italy, the Thomassima III was placed in long-term storage in a facility near Lake Como, Italy. It was exhibited at the Museo Ferrari in Maranello during 2014, as part of the "California Dreaming" exhibition. As of March 2020, the Thomassima III is owned by Meade's son and still kept in Italy.

=== Other projects ===
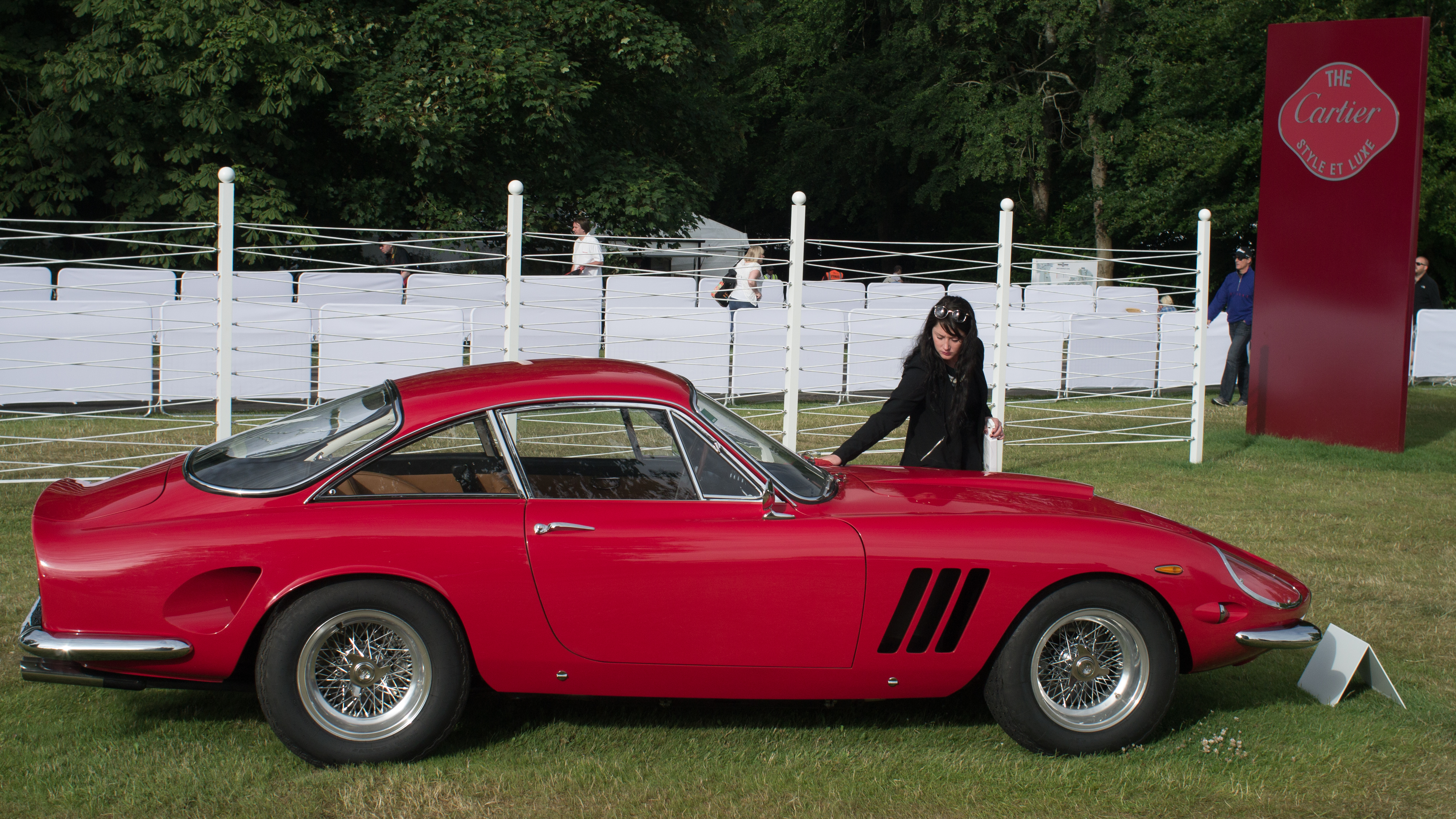
Ferrari 250 GT Lusso (chassis 4383GT) with modified bodywork by Fantuzzi and Meade

In addition to the Thomassima cars, Meade constructed multiple other custom cars with the help of his Italian collaborators. These included the Nembo series of Ferrari 250 GT–based road cars, built in collaboration with Neri and Bonacini. Three Nembo spiders and one Nembo coupé were built.

Meade modified seven or eight Ferrari 250 GT Lussos with 330 LMB-style front bodywork, including triple "nostril"-style air intakes and/or aerodynamic covered headlights. These cars were mostly purchased in wrecked or non-working condition from the Emilia-Romagna region near Modena, rebuilt and modified, and then resold.
