= Paolo Stanzani =

Italian mechanical engineer and automotive designer (1936-2017)

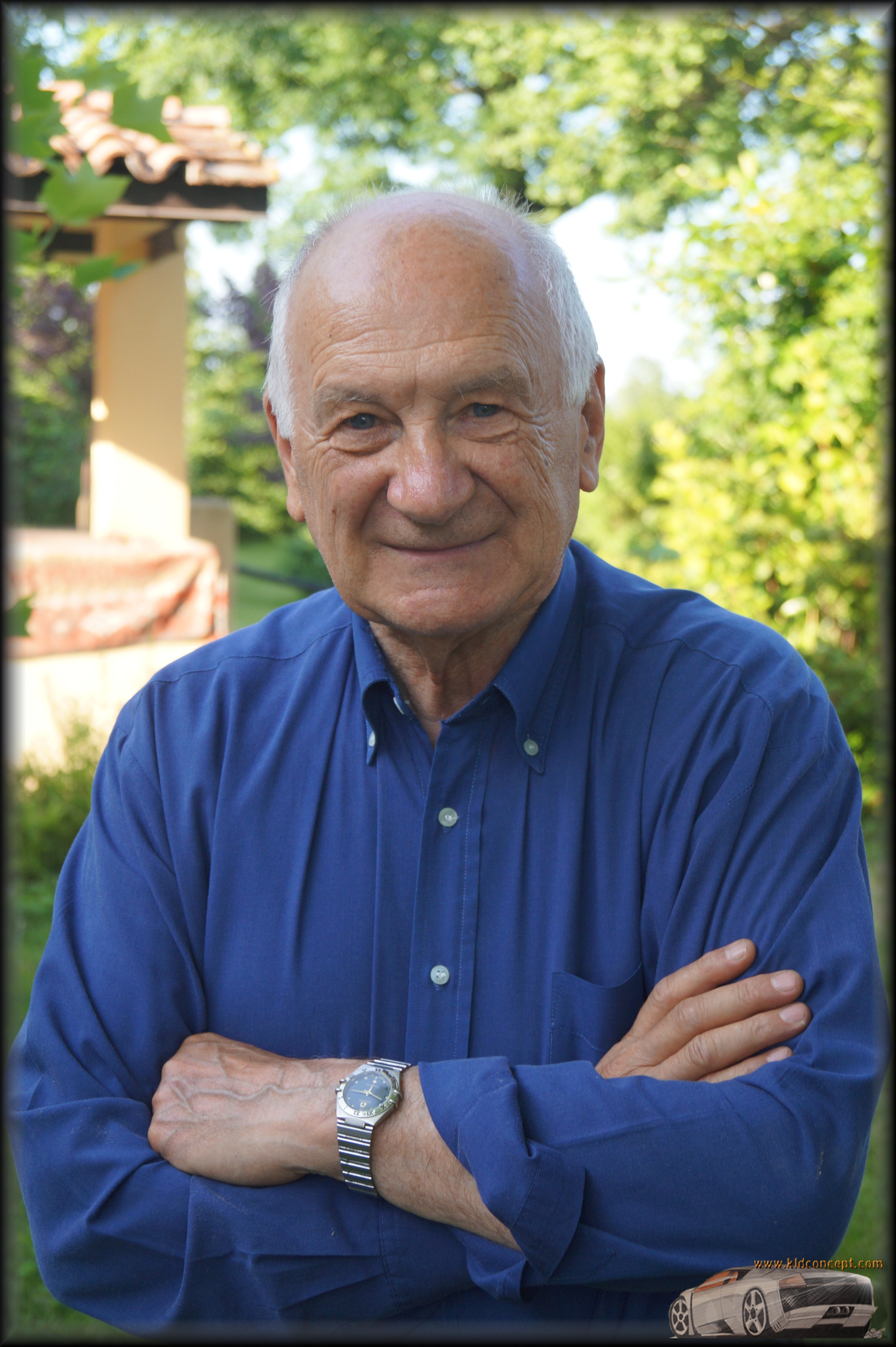
- Born: 20 July 1936; Bologna, Italy
- Died: January 18, 2017 (aged 80); Bologna, Italy
- Education: University of Bologna
- Occupation: Mechanical engineer

Paolo Stanzani (20 July 1936 – 18 January 2017) was an Italian mechanical engineer and automotive designer.

== Biography Introduction ==
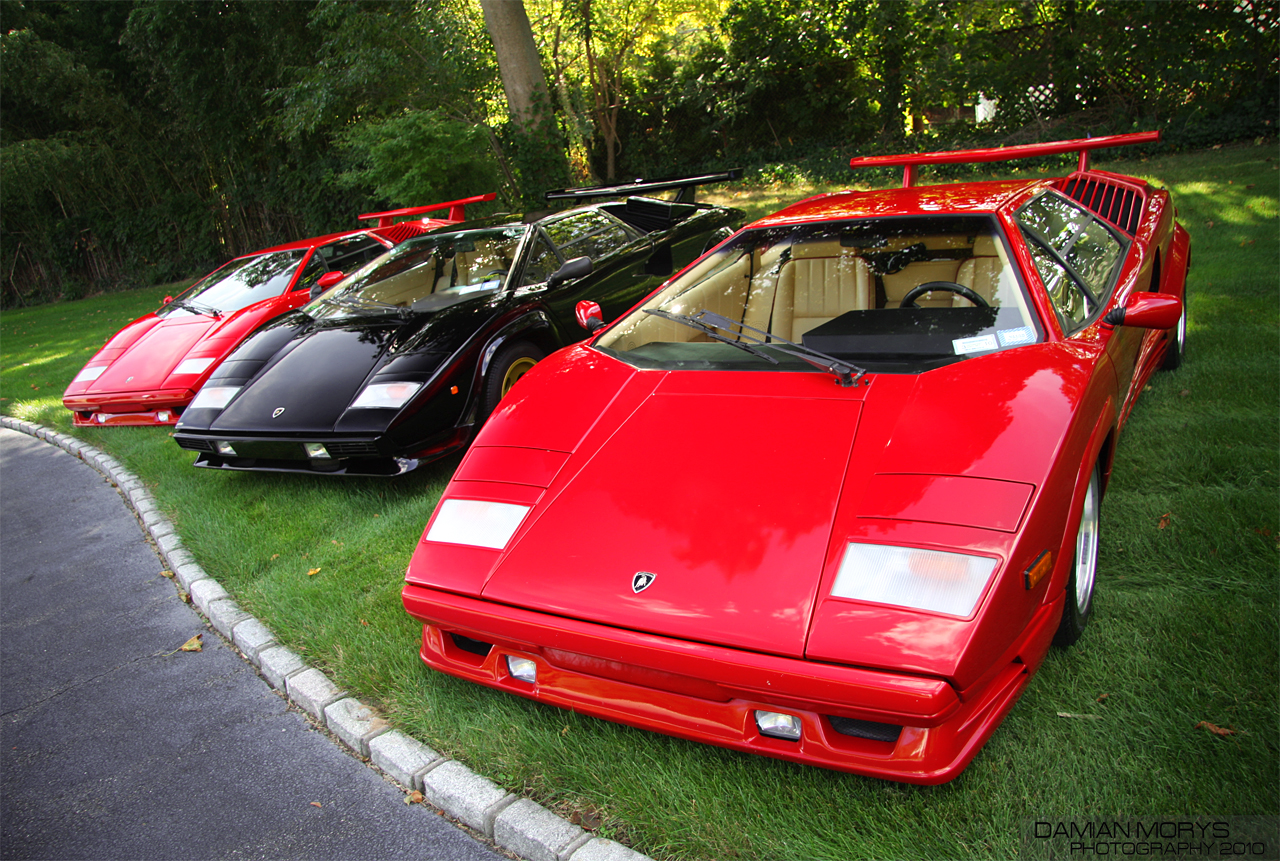
Lamborghini Countach

Paolo Stanzani was born in Bologna on 20th July 1936. His father worked for the Renzi Transportation company, and as a young boy, Paolo often accompanied his father when possible, thus developing a familiarity with trucks and internal combustion engines. His strong interest and aptitude for machinery led him to study Mechanical Engineering at the University of Bologna, writing his thesis on the 'Study of Hydraulic preamplifiers' which granted him his degree in the summer of 1962.

After graduation, Stanzani was immediately hired by Automobili Ferruccio Lamborghini S.p.A. on September 30, 1963 as assistant to Engineer Gianpaolo Dallara, then the Company's Technical Director who had started approximately one month before him. Stanzani worked for Lamborghini until 1975 and then established his own consultancy company and worked for several manufacturers including the reborn Bugatti Automobili in Campogalliano.

He is considered one of the "noble fathers" of the first Lamborghini production, in particular he had an important technical role in the creation of famous models, such as the Miura, and was the father of the Espada, the Urraco, the Countach, the Bugatti EB110.

== Early life and designs ==
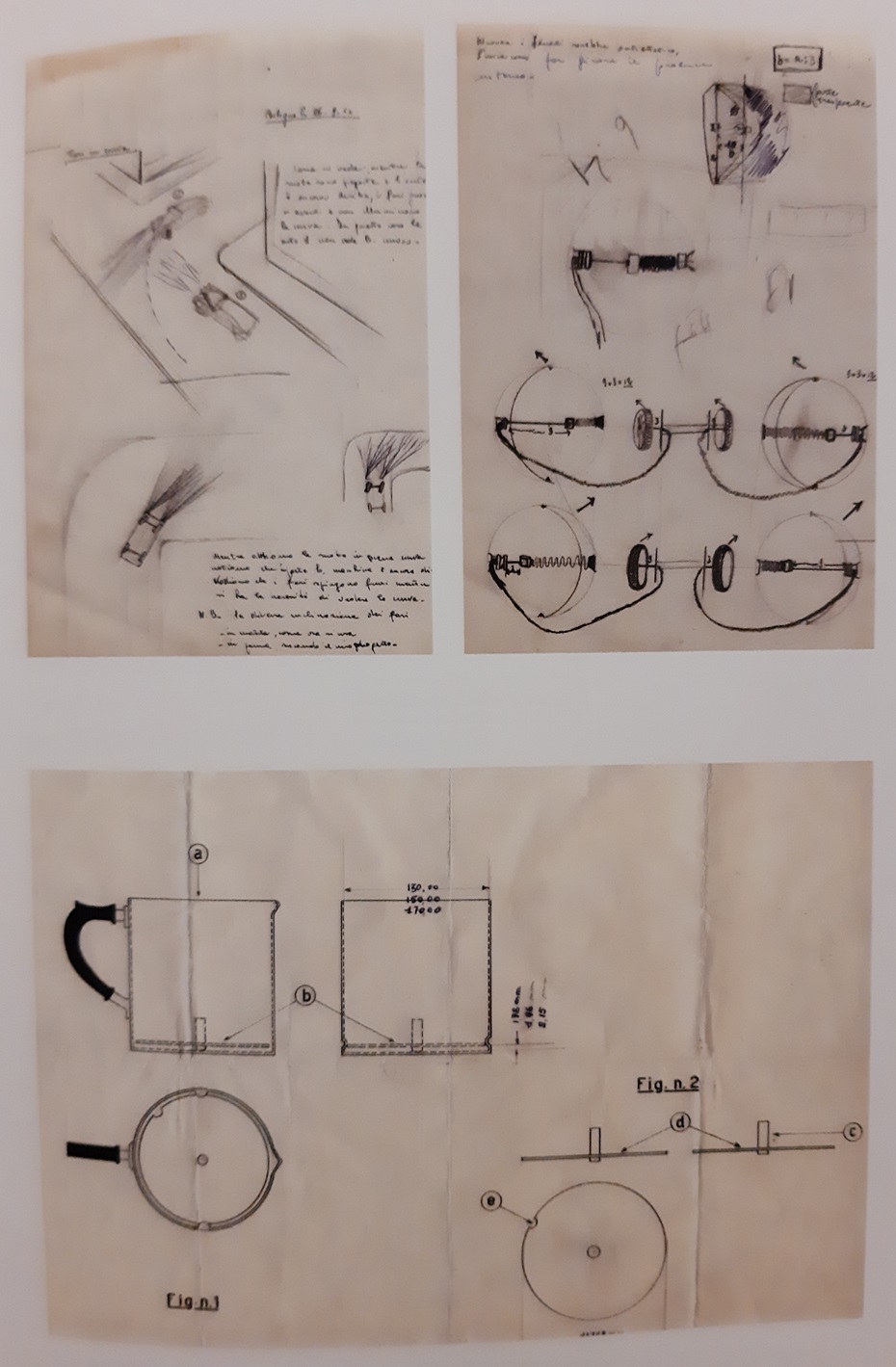
Patent drawings made by Paolo Stanzani as a teenager

His first idea and invention at the age of 16 was a patent for a milk heating device that prevented the milk from boiling over. He sold the patent and used the proceeds to buy a Laverda 75 small motorcycle which was registered by his mother since Stanzani was not yet at an age where he could legally obtain a driving licence.

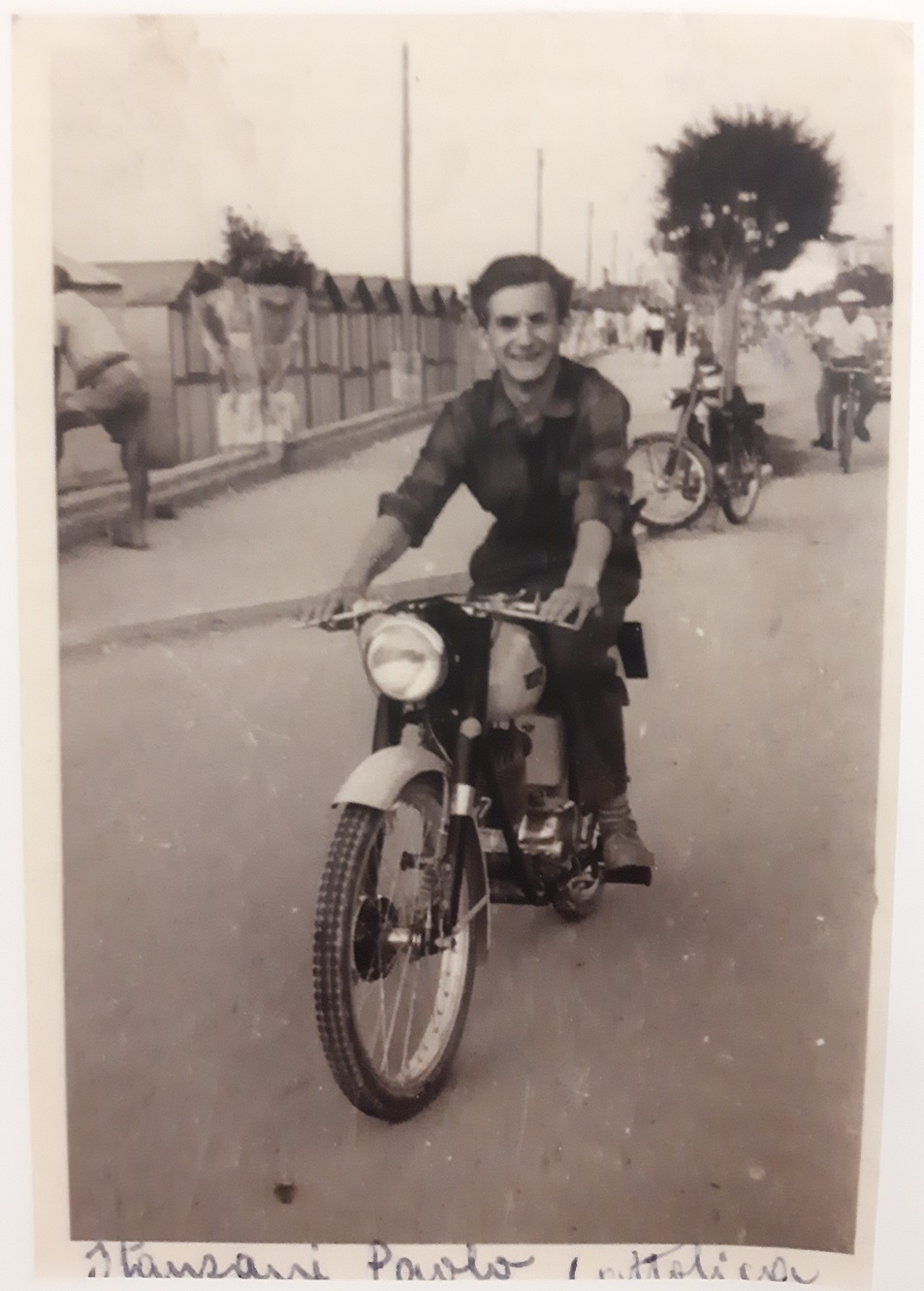
Paolo Stanzani onboard a Laverda 75 at the coastal town of Cattolica (Rimini)

He also conceived a system to make headlights swivel with the direction of the driver steering input, an idea presented to FIAT staff who however showed no interest. The same idea was later implemented by Citroen.

== Career at Lamborghini ==
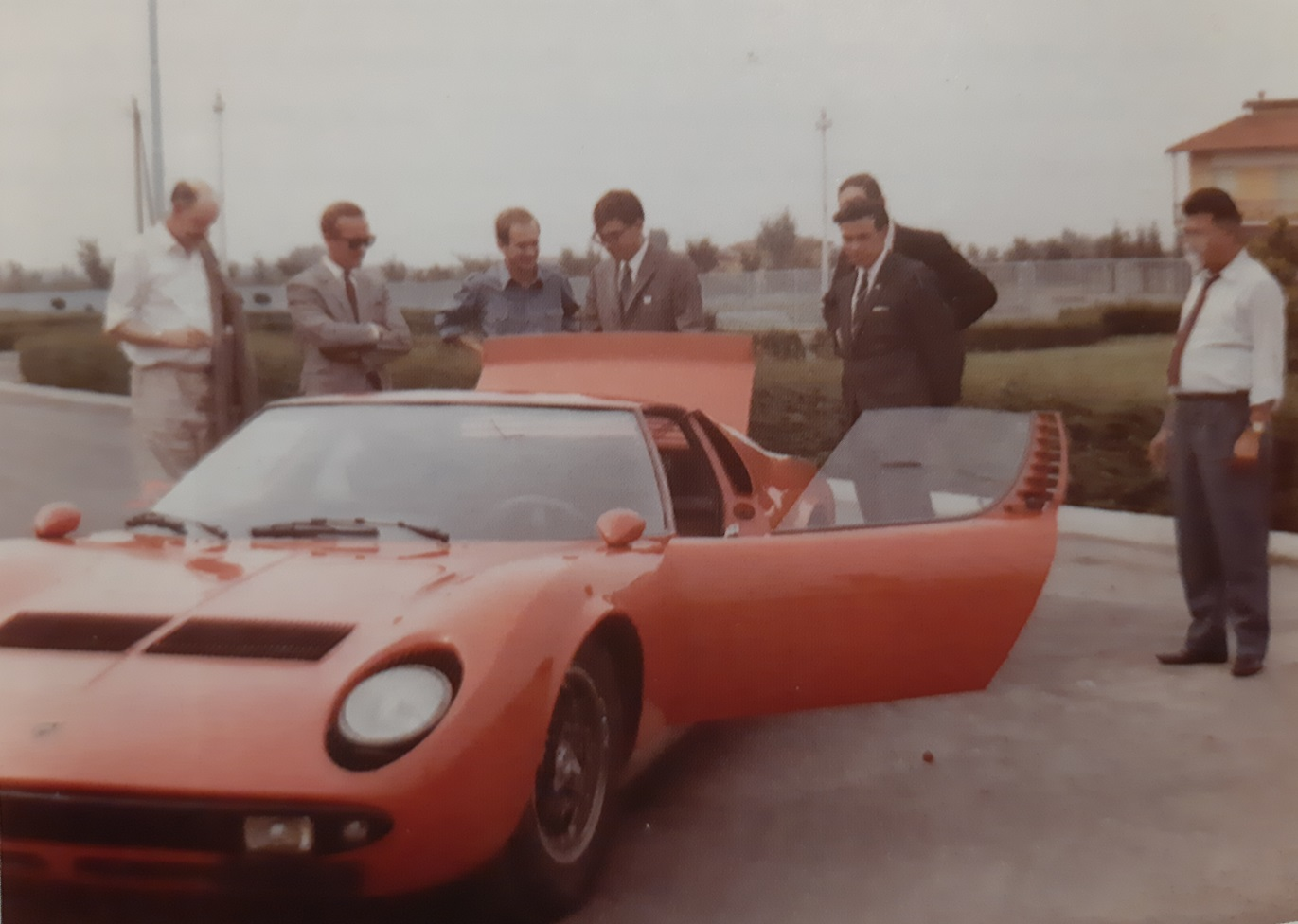
Lotus founder Colin Chapman and F1/F2 driver Jim Clark visit the Lamborghini factory

Stanzani worked at Lamborghini from 1963 until 1975 during a productive and successful period for the company when several models were launched and sold, before the 1973 oil crisis had a major effect on vehicles with relatively large engines and high performance (high fuel consumption). The first large task for Stanzani was to modify (rework) the engine of the first Lamborghini road car, the 350 GT to make it more cost-effective and tractable for everyday 'road car' usage. In order to be paid in full, ex-Ferrari engine designer Giotto Bizzarrini had reached the goals set by Ferruccio Lamborghini by designing an engine with racing parts: cam-shafts with high lift, connecting rods machined from billet forgings etc. Stanzani's task was to reduce the cost of parts: for example reverting from machined connecting rods to cast con-rods, altering cam-shaft profiles to produce torque at lower engine speeds, procuring carburettors which would meet cost and drivability criteria for a road car.

Until 1967 Paolo Stanzani dealt in particular with dimensional-structural calculations, with the 'Reparto Esperienze' Testing Department (Engine test rooms, Road tests, Homologation) and relations with the body shops (Touring, Bertone, Marazzi, Zagato, Silat). It is the era of the 350 GT, 400 GT, Islero and above all the Miura. Stanzani is one of the fathers of the Miura. At the time of its development the Miura contained numerous innovative features for a road car, such as a transversely mounted V12 engine with integral transmission, a fruit of the talents and successful collaboration between Dallara, Stanzani and Bizzarrini (for the engine). The open mind to try new things in Lamborghini led Stanzani to make it his goal to "Do today what others will do tomorrow" (“Fare oggi quello che altri faranno domani”).

From 1967 Stanzani took on the position of General Manager and from 1968 he became also Technical Director. By way of seniority the role should have been given by Ferruccio Lamborghini to Dallara but the owner either preferred the dedication of Stanzani or believed Dallara was always more keen towards racing. Dallara left shortly thereafter but nevertheless remained on good terms with Stanzani for the rest of their careers.

These are the years in which legendary models such as the Espada, the Jarama, the Miura S, the Miura SV, the Urraco and the Countach enter production. While still in Lamborghini, Paolo Stanzani heads the development of the BMW Turbo concept, with styling designed by Paul Bracq (the shape will be evolved six years later for the BMW M1 supercar), a car created to celebrate the 1972 Munich Olympics. The chassis is borrowed from the Lamborghini Urraco, while the engine is a 2.0 four-cylinder derived from that of the 2002tii.

After the sale of 51% of the company shares by Ferruccio Lamborghini to swiss Georges-Henri Rossetti and the remaining 49% to his colleague René Leimer, Stanzani found it difficult to obtain decisions and financial support from the new owners and therefore left Lamborghini Automobili in February 1975. The company would go bankrupt in 1978.

== Work beyond supercars ==
Stanzani made some personal considerations on the social benefit of designing and selling high performance vehicles to wealthy individuals, which he started to view as not so beneficial to society. Therefore he chose to work for a company under the ENI Group (Ente Nazionale Idrocarburi) that built water dams (for example on the Ridracoli water dam, situated between Forli' and Florence). Between 1979 and 1986 he worked on contract design for some car manufacturers (Renault, Alfa Romeo, Suzuki) and founded an engineering and business administration studio in Bologna. This studio grew over time, becoming the PRO Group, operating in Information Technology as a global partner of companies offering software for business management and technical project management.

== The rebirth of Bugatti ==
Stanzani had always kept a friendly relationship with Ferruccio Lamborghini after 1975 and visited his former employer at the estate of 'La Fiorita', in Umbria. Ferruccio had started to voice his dream of building another sports car but his ideas were usually met with practical counter-arguments by Stanzani in relation to the higher costs for bodywork and engine development. The participation of Nuccio Bertone in early discussion brought more concrete possibilities of a project because Lamborghini and Bertone had a strong level of mutual trust. There was still a need to find an investor to bring financial backing to the idea.

Ex-Lamborghini Technical Director Franco Baraldini (whose family runs the INECO dealership since 1989), introduced Ferruccio Lamborghini and Romano Artioli. Romano Artioli was the brother of Giancarlo Artioli who in 1978 had established the Autoexpo company which imported and registered vehicles in Italy and Europe. Buoyed by the successful sales of Ferrari, Suzuki and other cars by Autoexpo, Romano Artioli had the required financial means to pursue the idea of a supercar but wanted to fulfil the childhood dream of bringing back the Bugatti brand. Ferruccio Lamborghini soon lost interest and backed out of the project, suggesting nonetheless that Stanzani continue.

Stanzani maintained the early project moniker of FL12 (an acronym for 'Ferruccio Lamborghini 12 Cylinders') while the concepts for the mechanical layout of the vehicle were being worked on at Tecnostile, the same company that had developed the engine and several designs for the Cizeta-Moroder V16T. Tecnostile founders Achille Bevini and Oliviero Pedrazzi were well known to Stanzani as they had worked in Lamborghini as draughtsmen on the Bizzarrini engine for the first road car. Tecnostile's team of approximately 15 people worked on the designs of the V12 engine, aluminium honeycomb chassis, suspension and most of the parts required for the car that would become the EB110.

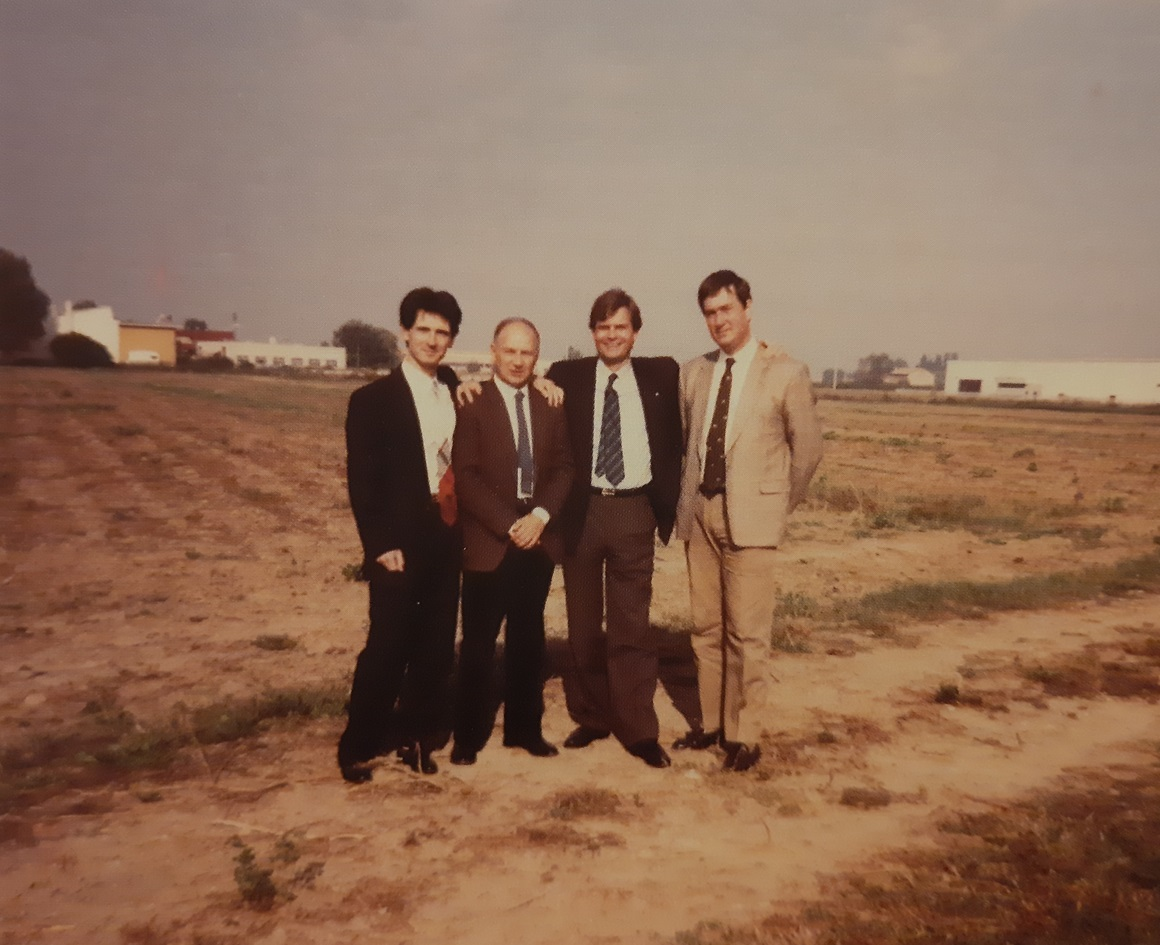
Standing at the site of the land in Capogalliano. From the left Jean Marc Borel, Paolo Stanzani, Jan Krister Breitfeld, Michel Bugatti.

In 1987 Stanzani identified a trapezium shaped lot of land lying adjacent (on the west side) to the A22 motorway and ~2.5 km north of the A1 motorway, in the district of Campogalliano, 10 km north-west of Modena. This would allow space for the gradual construction of a production plant for the new vehicle.

In the initial agreements for the Bugatti company and the vehicle development in Campogalliano (Modena), Stanzani was appointed Sole Director (Amministratore Unico) of Bugatti Automobili S.p.A. and given a 35% share of the company. Stanzani was Managing and Technical Director of Bugatti Automobili until July 1990 and left after Romano Artioli increased the capital in the company, thus diluting the share of Stanzani. After his departure, Stanzani was never mentioned in any press or media materials, until much later when web articles of the 2000s retraced the genesis of the project.

Bugatti Automobili would go bankrupt in 1995.

== After Bugatti: Formula 1 ==
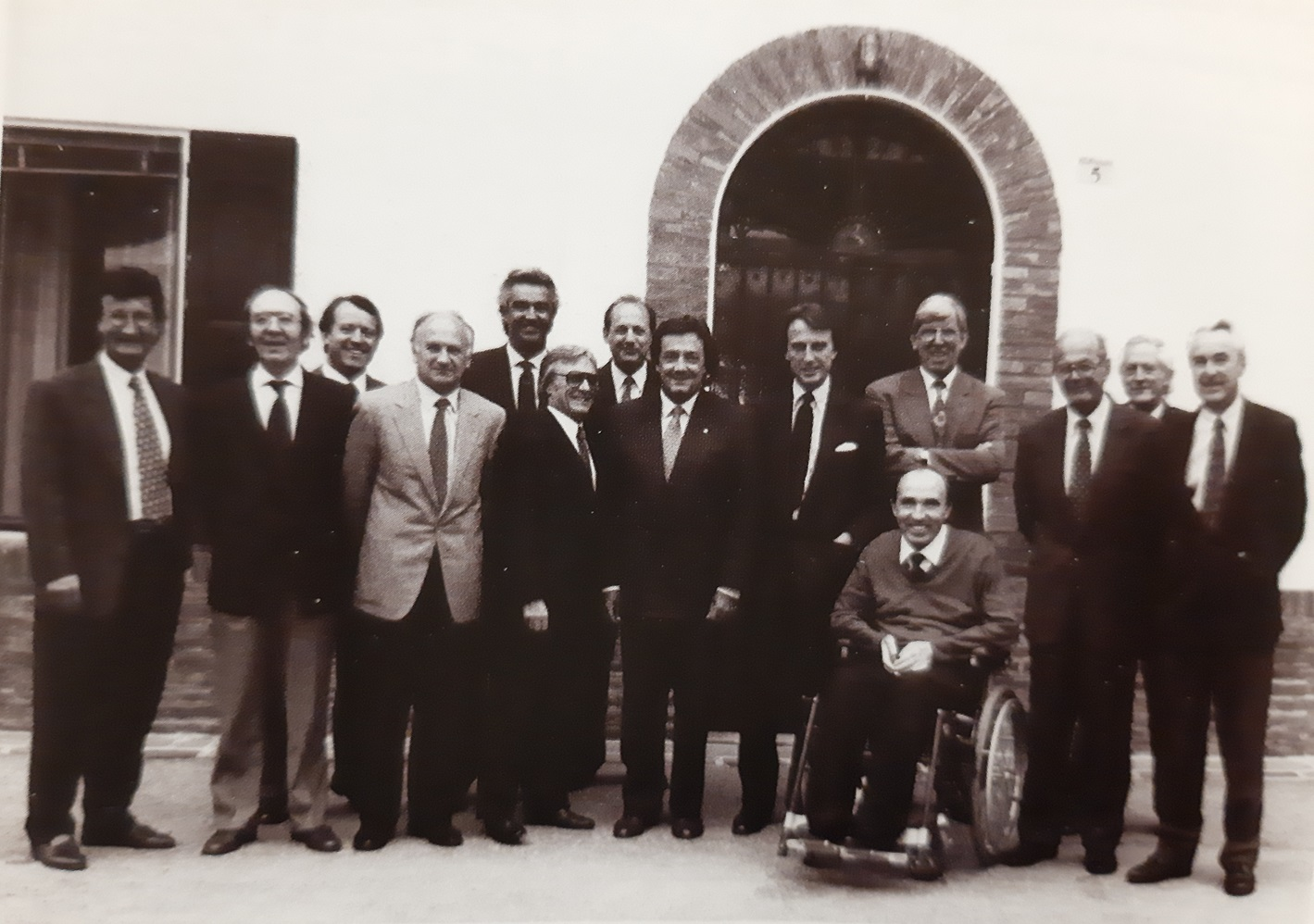
Team Managers at Maranello: Jordan, Lombardi, Oliver, Stanzani, Briatore, Ecclestone, Dennis, Minardi, Montezemolo, Tyrrell, Williams, Rumi, Palazzoli, Larousse.

In 1991 Stanzani was called into F1 by Giuseppe Lucchini to lead the BMS Scuderia Italia. Lucchini belonged to a family active in Italian steel making and had driven Osella racing cars in the 1970s. The Brixia Motor Sport outfit had been involved in Touring Cars prior to entering Formula 1 in 1988. Here Stanzani was reunited with Engineer Giampaolo Dallara, whose company supplied of the composite chassis for the team based in Brescia.

During this time he found it challenging to bring certain know-how in-house because the engine supplier (first Judd, then Ferrari) was mostly leasing or selling the engines with no internal access and very little published data on the performance. This was in stark contrast with Stanzani's full view of the powertrain at Lamborghini. Good relationships with Dallara meant a better grasp of the chassis and suspension dynamics but a switch to Lola chassis for 1993 - due to the benefit of the chassis being provided free of charge - caused a reduction in aerodynamic downforce and frustration for the drivers, Stanzani and Lucchini.

Having considered that the Ferrari engine was probably supplied in relatively conservative state of tune, Stanzani started negotiations with Honda for usage of their engines. Negotiations were underway but Honda decided instead to supply Team Lotus for their Lotus 107. Seeing clear indications that the BMS racing team would receive reduced sponsorship, Stanzani encouraged Lucchini and Giancarlo Minardi to speak together so that the two could broker a deal to merge Scuderia Italia and Minardi. Giancarlo Minardi became the President and Paolo Stanzani the Vicepresident of the new organisation fielding the F194 with chassis from ATR Group (composites manufacturer) and engine from Ford Cosworth (HB). Technical Director of the time was Aldo Costa.

Immediately after the accident of Ayrton Senna at the 1994 San Marino Grand Prix Stanzani called for the race to be stopped but the FIA and FOTA continued with the race. With his daughter he visited the Ospedale Maggiore hospital, where driver Pedro Lamy had also gone to check the condition of the Brazilian driver.

== After Formula 1 ==
After the merger between BMS Scuderia Italia and Minardi, Stanzani still very much admired the human and technical qualities of Giancarlo Minardi, but was falling out of love with the very large amounts of money required to stay on the grid, making life for smaller teams very difficult. He therefore left the team in 1995 and with some partners founded a company dedicated to renewable energy power generation. The company operates to this day https://www.energyintelligence.it/.
