= FNM =

FNM may refer to:

== Companies ==
- Fannie Mae, an American mortgage guarantor
- Fábrica Nacional de Motores, a defunct Brazilian automobile manufacturer
- Fábrica Nacional de Mobilidades, a Brazilian automotive manufacturer
- Fábrica Nacional de Munições de Armas Ligeiras, a defunct Portuguese munitions manufacturer
- Ferrocarriles Nacionales de México, Mexico's national railway company
- Ferrovie Nord Milano, an Italian transport company

== Football ==
- F.C. Nassaji Mazandaran, an Iranian football club in Qa'em Shahr, Mazandaran, Iran
- FC Nika Moscow, a Russian association football club
- FC Nyva Myronivka, a Ukrainian football club from Myronivka, Kyiv Oblast
- FK Nov Milenium, a football club in Sušica near Strumica, Macedonia

== Music ==
- Faith No More, an American alternative metal band
- "Free Nelson Mandela", a 1984 song by The Special A.K.A.

== Other ==
- Fake News Media
- Florence Nightingale Medal, created by the Red Cross
- Florida Naval Militia, a defunct military reserve of the United States Navy
- Free National Movement, a Bahamian political party
- Friday Night Magic, a Magic: The Gathering tournament
- Filem Negara Malaysia, a defunct agency of the government of Malaysia
