= Alfa Romeo 2600 =

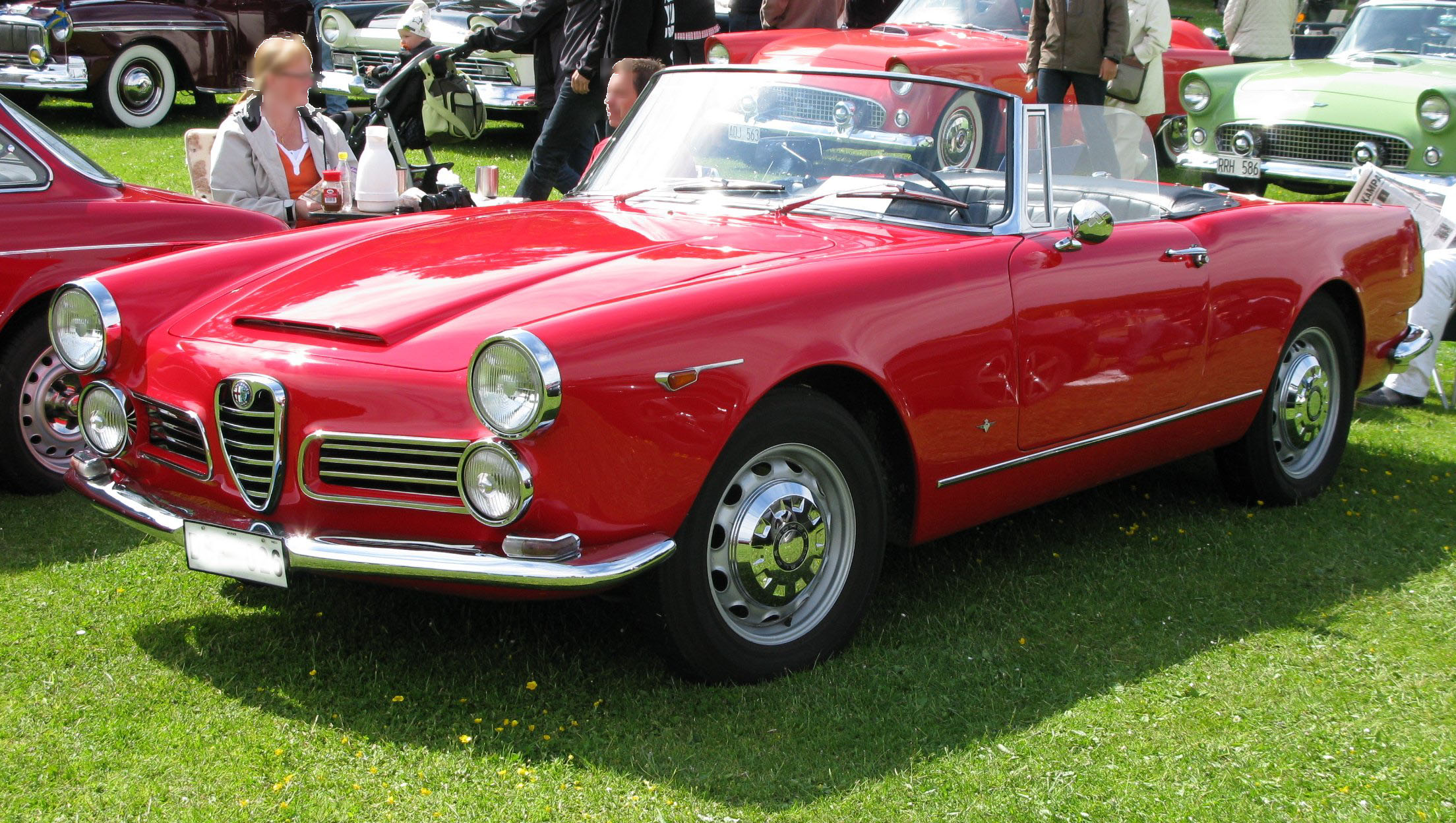
- Alfa Romeo 2600 Spider

Overview
- Manufacturer: Alfa Romeo
- Production: 1962–1968; 11,346 produced: 2,092 Berlina; 6,999 Sprint; 105 Sprint Zagato; 2,255 Spider; 54 OSI De Luxe
- Assembly: Italy: Portello Plant, Milan; South Africa: East London (Car Distributors Assembly: 1963–1968 – 2600 Berlina)
- Designer: Giorgetto Giugiaro at Bertone (Sprint); Ercole Spada at Zagato (SZ); Rodolfo Bonetto at Touring (Spider); Giovanni Michelotti for OSI (Berlina De Luxe)

Body and chassis
- Class: Executive car
- Body style: 4-door Berlina (sedan); 2-door Spider (convertible); 2-door Sprint (coupe)
- Layout: FR layout
- Related: Alfa Romeo 2000

Powertrain
- Engine: 2.6 L DOHC straight-6
- Transmission: 5-speed manual

Dimensions
- Wheelbase: Berlina/Sprint/Spider; 2,720 mm (107.1 in)/2,580 mm (101.6 in)/2,500 mm (98.4 in)
- Length: 4,700 mm (185.0 in)/4,580 mm (180.3 in)/4,500 mm (177.2 in)
- Width: 1,700 mm (66.9 in)/1,706 mm (67.2 in)/1,690 mm (66.5 in)
- Curb weight: 1,220–1,380 kg (2,690–3,042 lb)

Chronology
- Predecessor: Alfa Romeo 2000
- Successor: Alfa Romeo Alfa 6

The Alfa Romeo 2600 (Tipo 106) was Alfa Romeo´s six-cylinder flagship produced from 1962 to 1968. It was the successor to the Alfa Romeo 2000. It has become historically significant as the last Alfa Romeo to have been fitted with a straight-six engine with twin overhead camshafts. That had been the traditional Alfa Romeo engine configuration since the 1920s, but gave way to four-cylinder engines as the factory oriented its production towards more economical mass-produced car models starting in 1950.

The 2600 was introduced at the 1962 Geneva Motor Show, as a sedan with a factory-built body (2600 Berlina), a two-plus-two seater convertible with body by Carrozzeria Touring (2600 Spider), and a coupe with a body by Bertone (2600 Sprint). A convertible based on the Sprint coupe was shown by Bertone in 1963. It was also named 2600 Sprint, but did not enter production. The limited edition 2600 SZ (Sprint Zagato) with fastback coupe bodywork by Zagato, and the very limited-edition 2600 De Luxe with five-window sedan bodywork by OSI (Officine Stampaggi Industriali) were introduced three years later in 1965 at the Frankfurt Motor Show.

== Overview ==
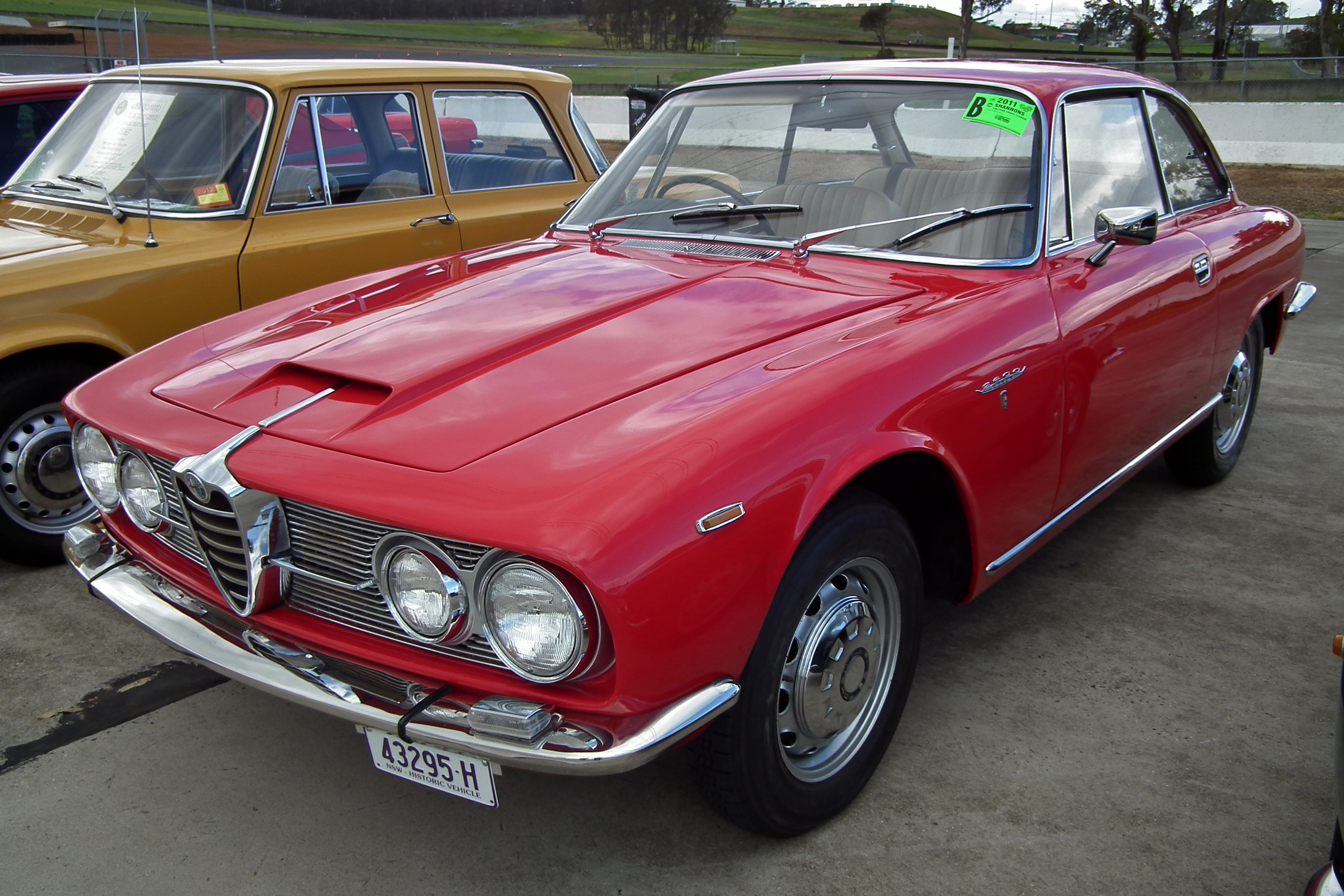
2600 Sprint

The Berlina, Spider and Sprint were based on the corresponding models in the 2000 range, and all three inherited the body styling of their predecessors with minor facelifts. The biggest change was the engine. A brand new all-alloy 2.6-litre engine with six cylinders in line and twin overhead camshafts replaced the earlier four-cylinder engine with its cast-iron block and alloy head which dated back to the 1900 range of 1950. Two carburettors were fitted to the Berlina engines, giving 130 bhp (97 kW). The Sprint and Spider engines had three twin-choke horizontal carburettors and developed 145 bhp (108 kW). The OSI De Luxe was available with either the two-carb or the three-carb setup. The Sprint Zagato had 165 bhp (123 kW) with the three-carb setup.

Total production for the Berlina was 2038 cars, the Sprint was 6999 cars, the Spider was 2255 cars, the 2600 De Luxe was 54 cars and the Sprint Zagato was 105 cars.

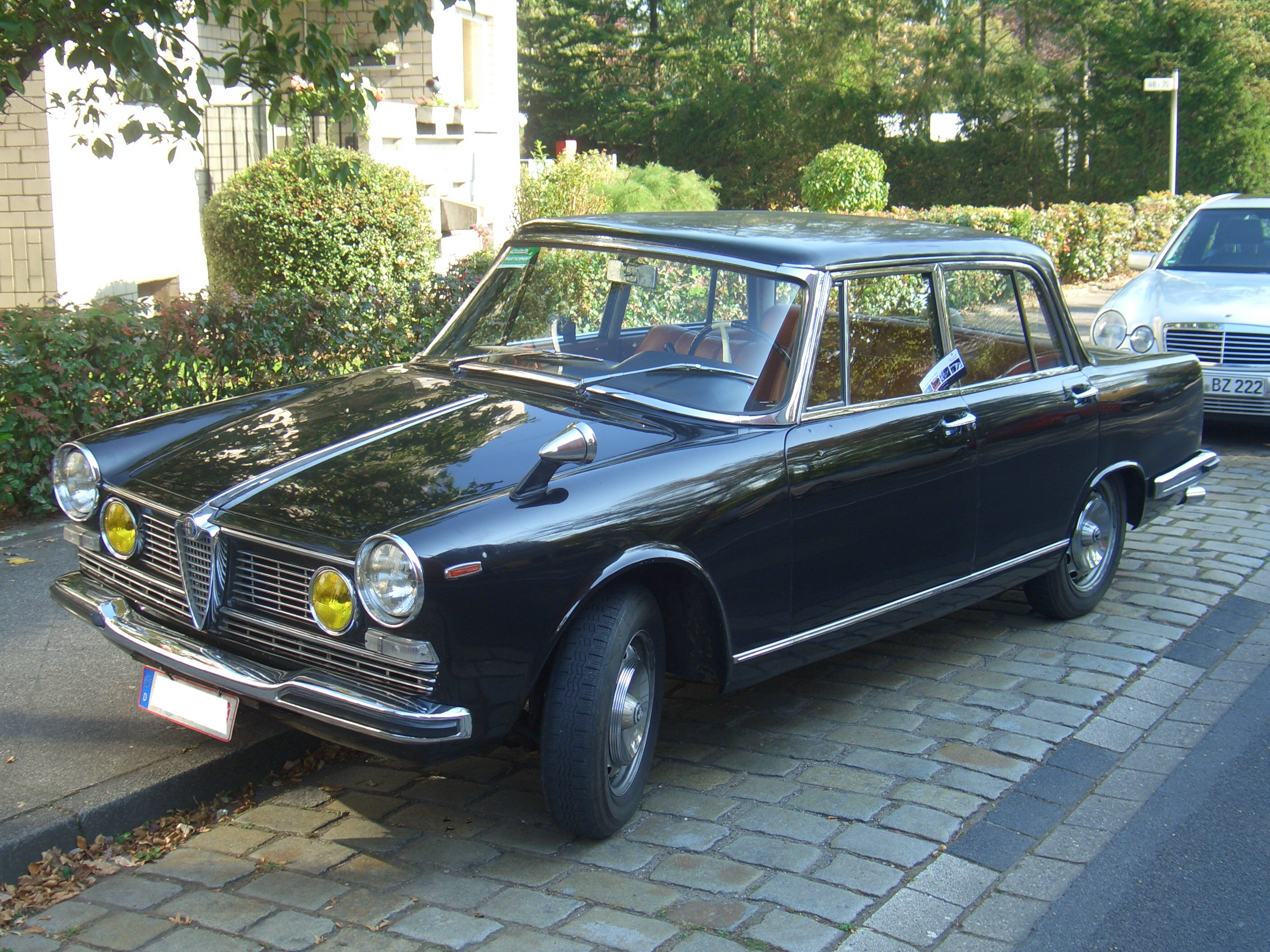
2600 Berlina

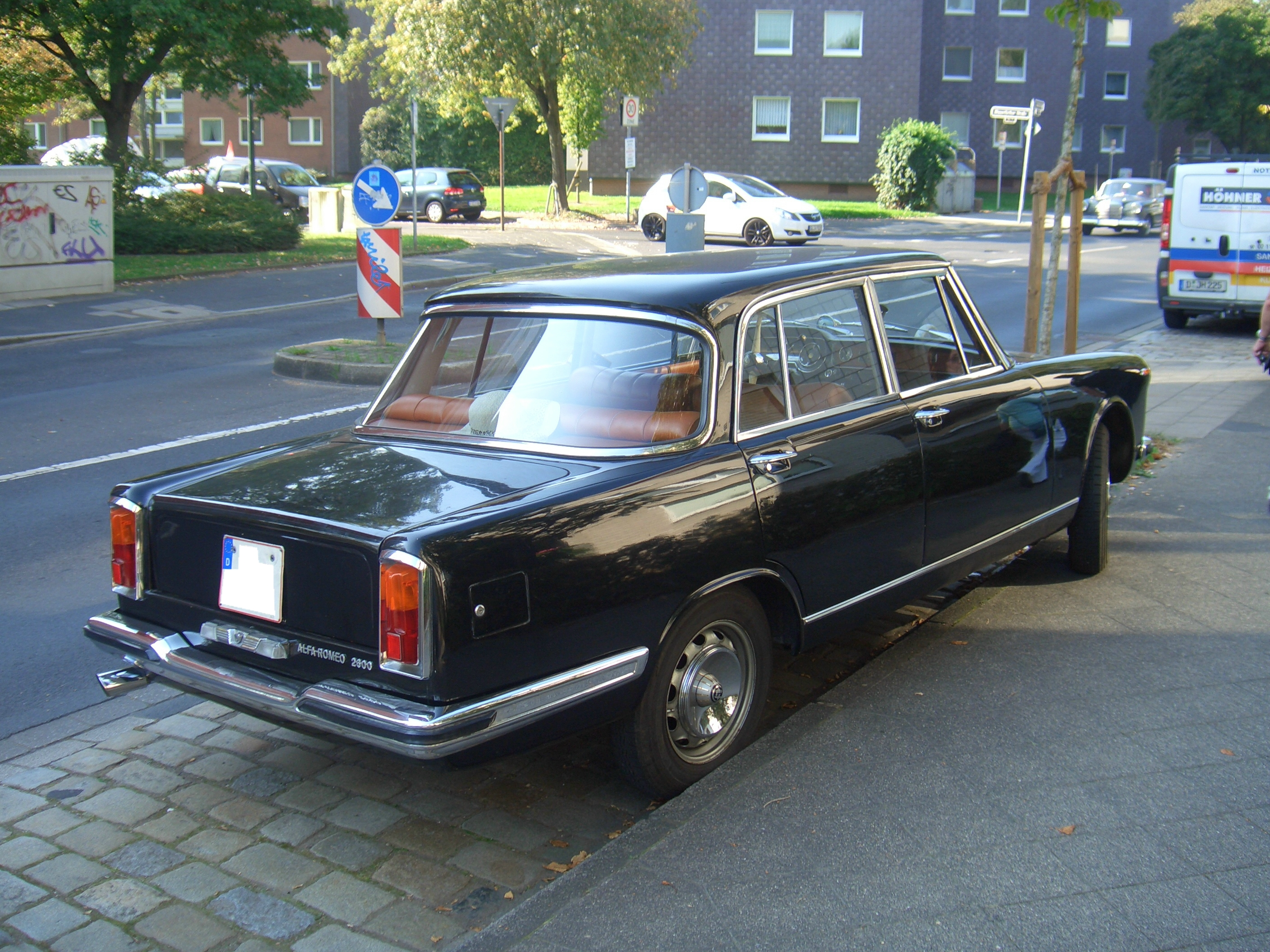
2600 Berlina

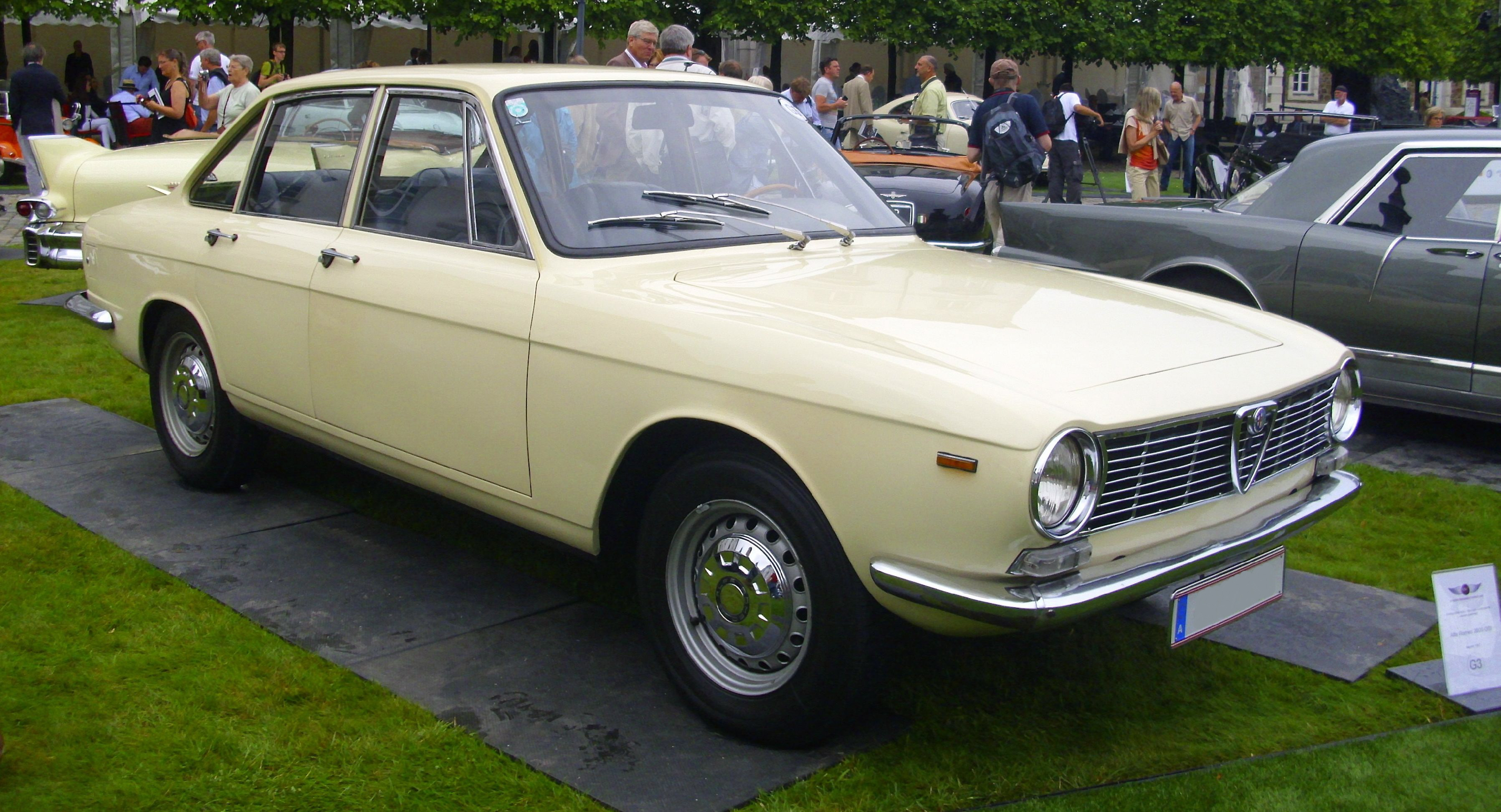
2600 Berlina de Luxe

From a sales point of view, the 2600 models were not a success, despite deserved acclaim for their excellent engine. The poor sales were not only due to the elevated prices of the 2600 models. The cars did not compare well with contemporary products, including those of Alfa Romeo itself. The factory had decided - correctly, as it turned out - to concentrate their limited development resources on the mid-sized Giulia which was introduced at about the same time. The flagship 2600 range was only a minor facelift of the 2000 range with a new engine, as this was all that the factory could do with the resources available. Since the 2000 itself had basically been a 1958 restyling of the 1950 1900, this left the 2600 with running gear a dozen years old at introduction.

The new engine also added weight and length at the front; though this did much for stability, it did not help the handling. Because the 2600 was a flagship Alfa Romeo model, expectations were high, and both critics and customers quickly spotted the deficiencies, both on paper and on the road. When the new Giulia appeared with completely new running gear, the 2600 was shown up even more.

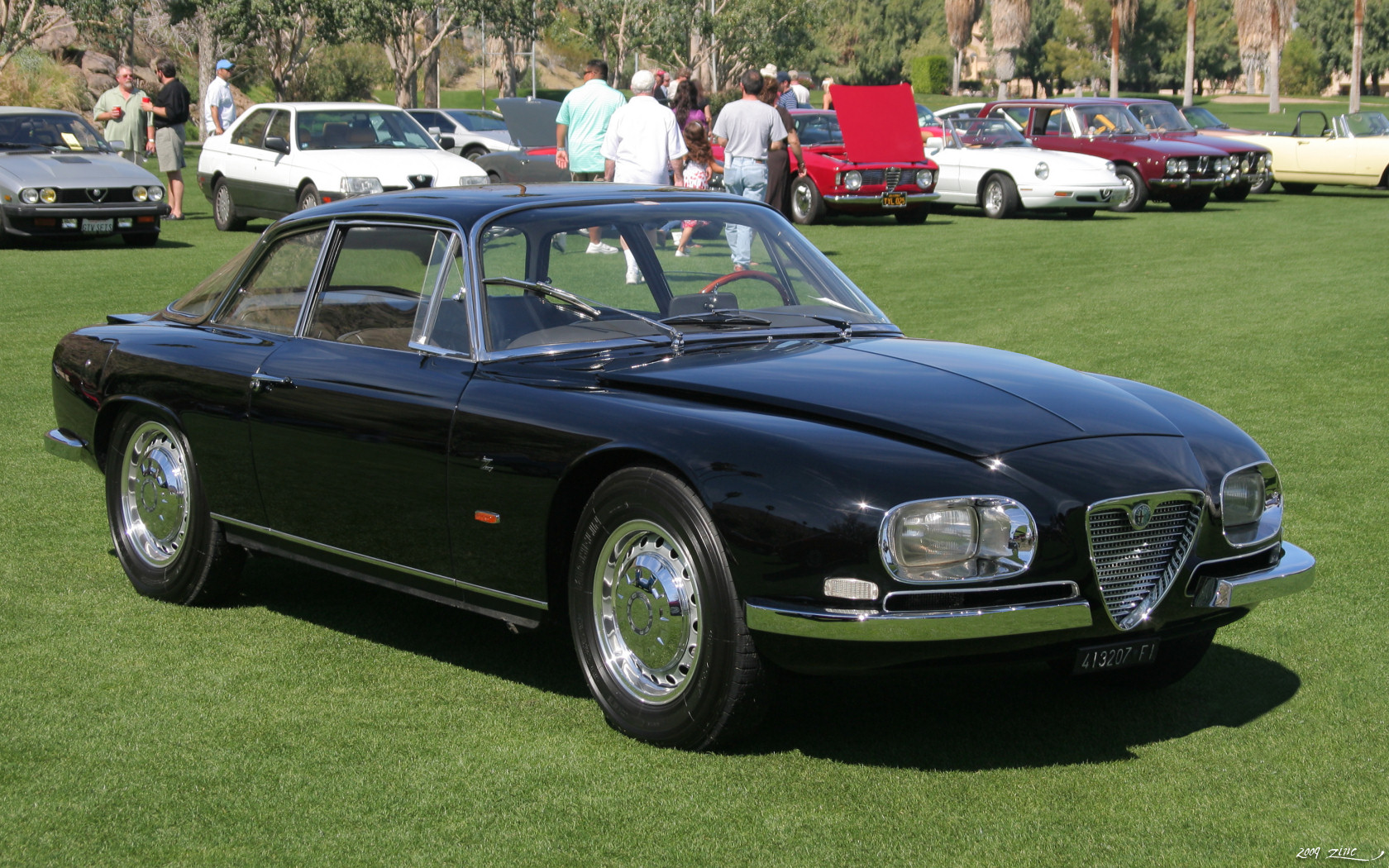
2600 Sprint Zagato

Another reason for slow sales was styling and concept. The Berlina's styling wasn't viewed positively and that reflected in the especially poor sales for this model. While most Alfa Romeo sedans in the marque's history outsold the more specialised sporting models in the same range, the 2600 Berlina did not outsell the 2600 Sprint or Spider. The 2600 Spider had styling which was seen to be derivative of that of its smaller stablemate, the Giulietta Spider: certainly handsome, but lacking the smaller car's grace and balance. The larger car's handling also suffered perhaps unfair comparison with that of the Giulietta Spider, and this is an important factor in a car with sporting pretensions. One sales point in its favor was that it was a four-seater convertible, though the two rear seats were fairly cramped.

The 2600 Sprint made more of an impression. It was a large grand touring coupé which could seat four adults in comfort over long journeys at high speeds. As such, it did not suffer unfair comparisons with other models in the Alfa Romeo range as none of them could be directly compared with it. In that mode of operation, oriented more towards fast touring than sporting driving, the agility and handling balance of the smaller Alfas mattered less, while the stability and smoother ride of the larger car, and the wide power and torque band of the six-cylinder engine, came onto its own. Added to the greater space and comfort, those virtues made a convincing case for the 2600 Sprint. The car also inherited the sharp, modern styling of its predecessor, the 2000 Sprint, and that certainly contributed to its being the top seller in the 2600 range. That shape had been the result of Giorgetto Giugiaro's first major project as head designer for Carrozzeria Bertone.

A certain number of 2600 Sprints were purchased by the Italian government and specially equipped and modified to be used as police patrol cars, nicknamed Pantera (panther) from the emblem of its rapid intervention team. The cars were very suitable for high-speed pursuits to counter the increase in armed robberies by motorized gangs in 1960s Italy, and appeared in quite a few genre movies of the time.

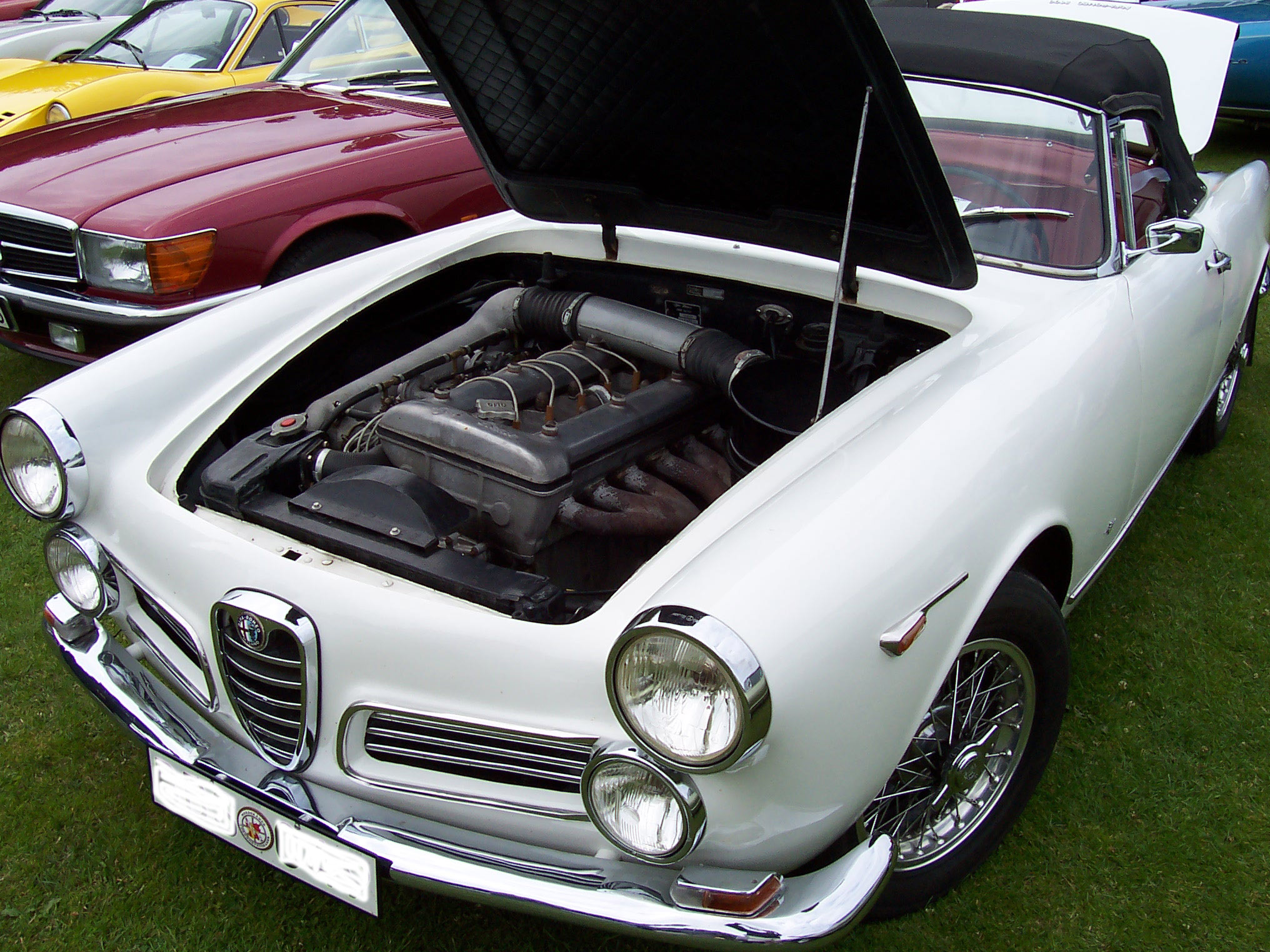
Alfa Romeo 2600 engine

The 2600 range was replaced at the top of the Alfa range by the 1750 models in 1968. The 1750s were refined versions of the 1600 cc Giulia range which continued in production, so once more the Alfa Romeo flagship was a derivative product created by upgrading the motor of an existing range and carrying out a minor restyling. All similarity with the 2600 ends there though; the 1750s, and the 2000s which evolved from them, were a great success for Alfa Romeo from every point of view, especially sales.

Today, the 2600 Sprint and Spider classics are known primarily for the styling of both the bodywork and the interior of the cars. They are also known for the performance, technology and sound of the six-cylinder twin-cam engine, and for their rarity compared to the more successful Alfa Romeo models of the same era. The limited production of these cars, and the fact their parts are unique to the 2600 range or derived from even earlier Alfas, means that owners are required to dedicate a lot of effort and resources to restoration and maintenance. Relatively few 2600 Berlinas have had long-term owners since the model was discontinued, and as a result, few examples remain. Only 105 2600 SZ's were produced and today they are considered among the most valuable models in the range. The 2600 OSI De Luxe was also produced in very small numbers.

=== Pininfarina Speciale ===
Pininfarina created two concept cars based on the 2600: the 2600 Cabriolet Speciale, a two-seat spider presented at the Turin Motor Show in 1962, and the 2600 Coupé Speciale, a two-seat coupé presented at the Brussels Motor Show in 1963. They were initially planned as mass market models, but neither reached production.

=== Engines ===
Model	Displacement	Fuel system	Compression ratio	Power	Top speed
Berlina, Berlina de Luxe	2,584 cc	Double Solex	8.5:1	130 PS (96 kW)	175 km/h (109 mph)
Sprint, Spider, Berlina de Luxe	2,584 cc	Triple Solex	9.0:1	145 PS (107 kW)	200 km/h (124 mph)
Sprint Zagato	2,584 cc	Triple Solex	9.0:1	165 PS (121 kW)	215 km/h (134 mph)

== Production ==
Year	1962	1963	1964	1965	1966	1967	1968	1969	Sum
Berlina	670	382	102	226	73	30	26	4	1,513
Berlina guida destra	0	0	35	65	0	0	0	0	100
Berlina CKD	52	373	0	0	0	0	0	0	425
Spider	515	984	589	64	0	0	0	0	2,152
Spider guida destra	0	1	102	0	0	0	0	0	103
Sprint	1,277	2,855	1,521	640	109	0	0	0	6,402
Sprint guida destra	1	0	219	362	15	0	0	0	597
Sprint Zagato	0	0	0	32	59	14	0	0	105
De Luxe (OSI)	0	0	0	16	26	12	0	0	54
Sum	2,515	4,595	2,568	1,405	282	56	26	4	11,451
Guida destra = right-hand drive; CKD = complete knock-down;
