= Alfa Romeo 2300 =

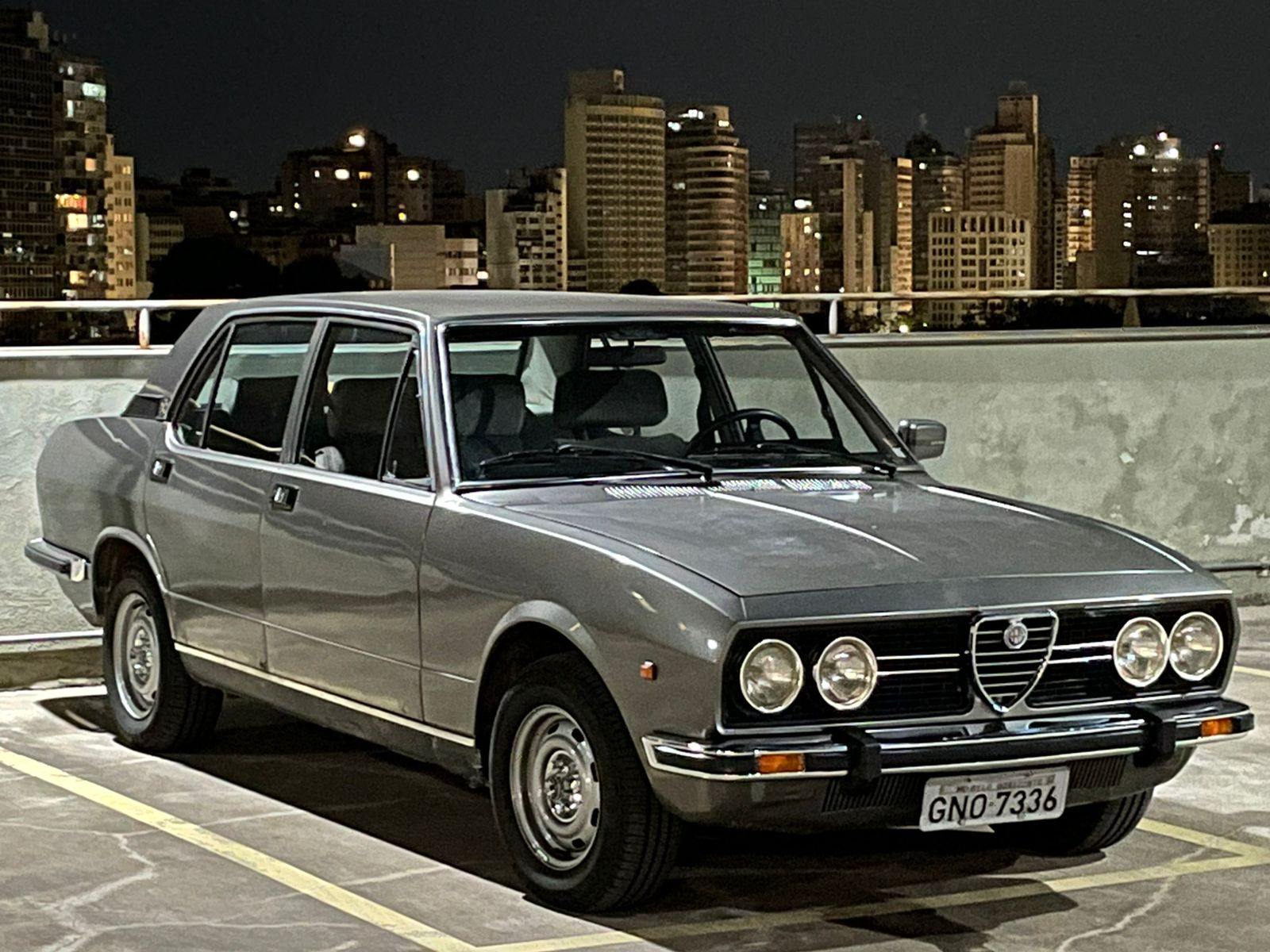

Overview
- Manufacturer: FNM (1974–1978); Fiat (1978–1986)
- Also called: Alfa Romeo 2300 Rio (European import markets)
- Production: March 1974 – November 1986
- Assembly: Brazil: Xerém, Rio de Janeiro (FNM); Betim, Minas Gerais (Fiat)

Body and chassis
- Class: Executive car (E)
- Body style: 4-door saloon
- Layout: Front-engine, rear-wheel-drive
- Related: Alfa Romeo 1900

Powertrain
- Engine: 2,310 cc (2.3 L) I4
- Transmission: 5-speed manual

Dimensions
- Wheelbase: 2,730 mm (107 in)
- Length: 4,690–4,719 mm (184.6–185.8 in)
- Width: 1,692 mm (66.6 in)
- Height: 1,362 mm (53.6 in)
- Curb weight: 1,360–1,412 kg (2,998–3,113 lb)

Chronology
- Predecessor: FNM 2150
- Successor: Alfa Romeo 164

The Alfa Romeo 2300 is an executive car that was produced by Brazilian automobile manufacturer Fábrica Nacional de Motores (FNM) from 1974 to 1978, and under Fiat from 1978 to 1986.

== Origin ==
The 2300 project traces its roots back to Italy as project 102/12. A prototype was assembled in 1971 and was sent to Brazil for tests in 1972. It was engineered entirely in Italy, specifically for the Brazilian market, and launched in March 1974 under the slogan "O importado fabricado no Brasil" ("The imported manufactured in Brazil", in Portuguese). At the time the adoption of 4 and 6-cylinder inline and V6 engines were studied, with some test mules tested with those engines, but due to the oil crisis in the 1970s and the arrival of a military government, import difficulties forced the factory to adopt the 4-cylinder engine from the Alfa Romeo 1900 with an increased displacement of 2,310 cc and coupled to a five-speed manual transmission.

== Overview ==
The general exterior design of the new car was very similar to that of the Italian built Alfetta saloon, designed by Giuseppe Scarnati and first offered in Europe in 1972, although the Brazilian car was actually 41 centimetres (16 in) longer and 7 centimetres (2.8 in) wider than the Alfetta. Under the skin, the 2300 was based technically on the older 1900. The gear box of the 2300 was conventionally located adjacent to the engine and not (as with the Alfetta) across the rear axle. Like its Brazilian predecessor, the FNM 2000, the 2300 featured a four-cylinder twin camshaft engine, displacing 2,310 cc with a claimed output of 140 hp (104 kW). A maximum speed of 170 km/h (106 mph) was claimed. In the 1985 model year leaflet, the 2300 was called as "Alfa Romeo 85". This model was supposedly manufactured until November 1986, although a final 243 Alfa Romeos were built in Brazil in 1987.

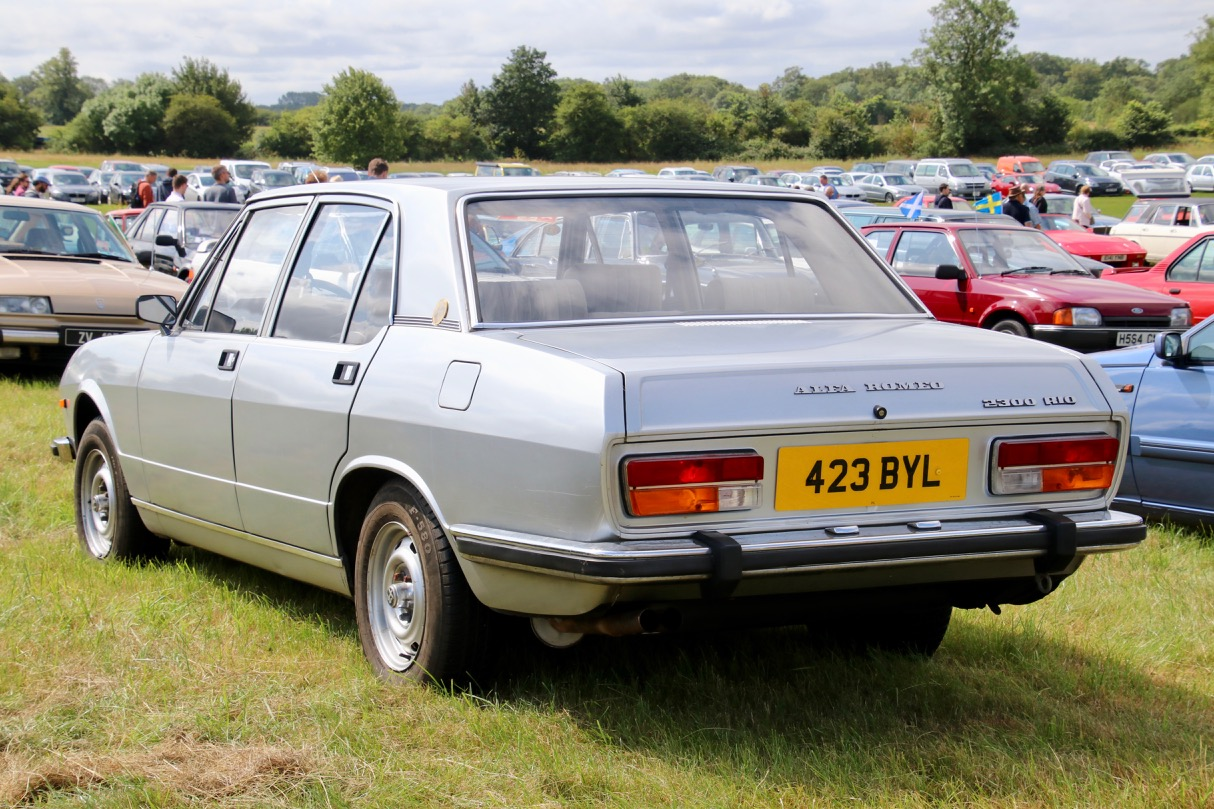
Alfa Romeo 2300 Rio (Europe)

As demand for ethanol-powered cars rose, a stockpile of petrol-powered 2300s built up: as a result, Alfa Romeo foisted the Brazilian Alfa Romeo onto European (Dutch, Swiss, and German) importers in 1981 under the designation Alfa Romeo 2300 Rio. Around 600 of the cars were shipped to The Netherlands. The cars generally failed to sell and severe quality issues further deteriorated Alfa Romeo's image in Central and Northern Europe, with the importers eventually being forced to buy back the majority of the cars brought over. In the Netherlands, the bought back cars were sold on to used car dealers after three years in outdoors storage; without warranties the already decaying cars caused severe damage to Alfa Romeo's already crumbling reputation. The only real value of the Rio seems to have been to provide parts for restorers of the vintage 1900.

== Technical data ==
Model	Engine	Max. Power	Max. Torque	Fuel system	Acceleration 0–100 km/h (0–62 mph) (seconds)	Top speed
2300 (1975)	2,310 cc I4	103 kW (140 PS) at 5,700 rpm	214 N⋅m (158 lb⋅ft) at 3,500 rpm	1 double barrel carburetor	11.7	170 km/h (106 mph)
2300 ti (1978)	2,310 cc I4	110 kW (150 PS) at 5,700 rpm	235 N⋅m (173 lb⋅ft) at 3,500 rpm	2 double barrel carburetors	10.8	195 km/h (121 mph)
2300 ti4 (1985)	2,310 cc I4	120 kW (163 PS) at 5,700 rpm	235 N⋅m (173 lb⋅ft) at 3,500 rpm	2 double barrel carburetors	12.0	195 km/h (121 mph)
