= Alfa Romeo 2000 =

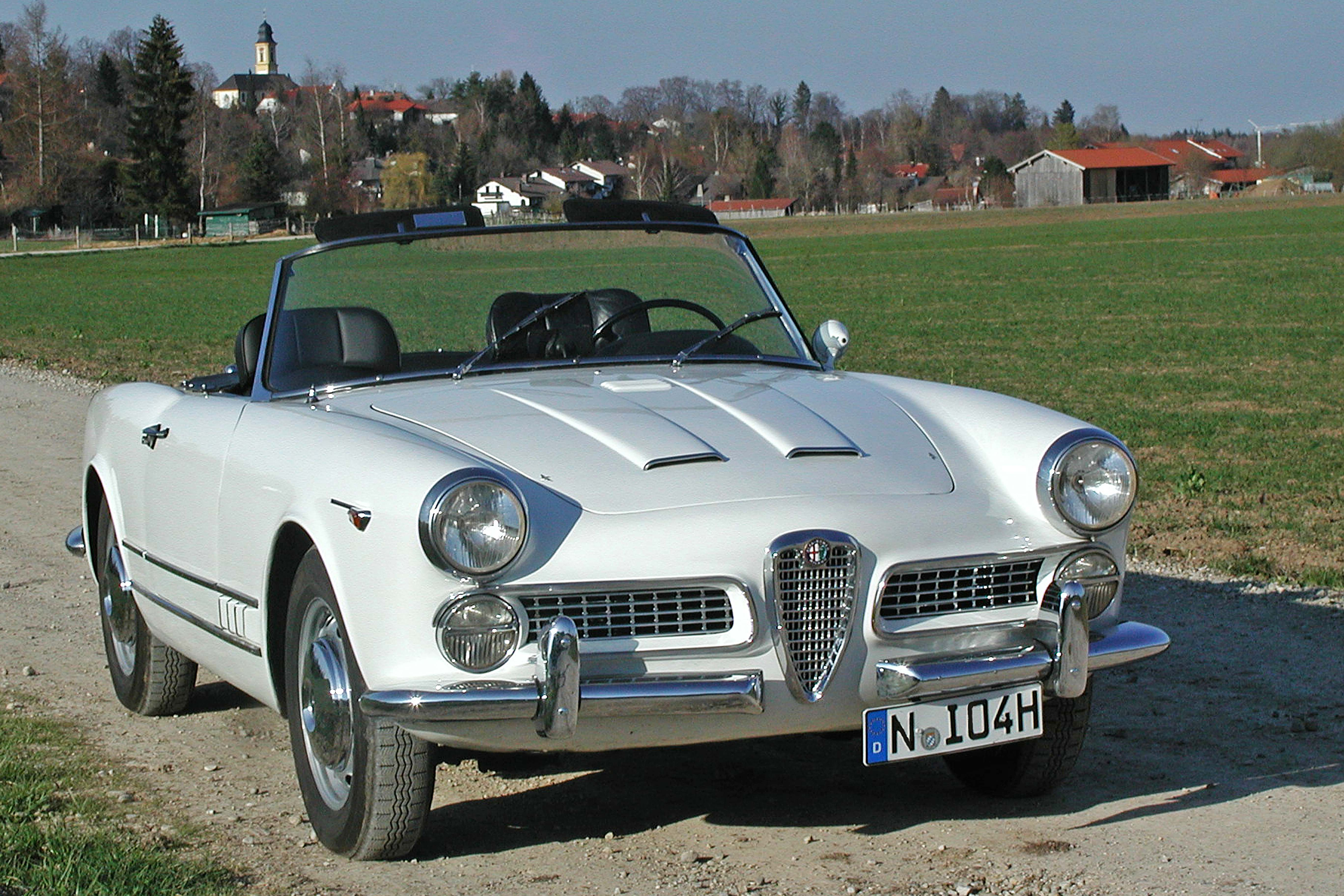
- Alfa Romeo 2000 Spider Touring

Overview
- Manufacturer: Alfa Romeo
- Production: 1958–1962
- Assembly: Italy: Portello Plant, Milan (Berlina)
- Designer: Giorgetto Giugiaro at Bertone (Sprint); Rodolfo Bonetto at Touring (Spider)

Body and chassis
- Body style: 4-door saloon (Berlina); 2-door convertible (Spider); 2-door coupé (Sprint)
- Layout: Front-engine, rear-wheel-drive
- Related: Alfa Romeo 2600

Powertrain
- Engine: 2.0 L I4
- Transmission: 5-speed manual

Dimensions
- Wheelbase: 2,720 mm (107.1 in) (Berlina); 2,500 mm (98.4 in) (Spider); 2,580 mm (101.6 in) (Sprint)
- Length: 4,710 mm (185.4 in); 4,496 mm (177.0 in)
- Width: 1,700 mm (66.9 in); 1,650 mm (65.0 in)
- Height: 1,430 mm (56.3 in); 1,320 mm (52.0 in)
- Kerb weight: 1,178–1,337 kg (2,597–2,948 lb)

Chronology
- Predecessor: Alfa Romeo 1900
- Successor: Alfa Romeo 2600

The Alfa Romeo 2000 (officially known as Tipo 102, Italian for Type 102) is a luxury car produced by Italian car manufacturer Alfa Romeo between 1958 and 1962, as a successor to the 1900 Super. It was replaced in 1962 by the Alfa Romeo 2600.

== History ==
The 2000 was presented in 1957 at the Turin Motor Show, with 4-door, 6-seater saloon Berlina body. Production started in 1958, and the car was available as Berlina or Spider convertible. In 1960, the Sprint coupé was added. The 2000 Berlina had gearbox operated via column-mounted shifter making space for three people in front. The two grand touring versions had the gear lever located in floor, and a higher output engine. Until 1961, when 2+2-seater became available, the Spider was a pure two-seater.

The 2000 Spider looked somewhat different in the United States from other markets: on European cars, the bonnet scoops were mounted apart from each other, rather than together and separated by a chrome piece as on American-market cars. European cars also received twin chrome strips along the lower flanks, whereas US cars only have a single strip.

The 2000 Sprint was one of the first designs by Giorgetto Giugiaro.

The last 2000s were built in 1962, when the more powerful six-cylinder Alfa Romeo 2600 was phased in.

=== 2000 Sprint Praho ===
For the 1960 Turin Motor Show, Touring presented a one-off coupé variant of the 2000. Carlo Felice Bianchi Anderloni of Carrozzeria Touring was asked by Alfa Romeo to create this showcar on the first chassis type 102.05, s/n 001. That same type would later underpin the production coupé version styled by Giugiaro. The car had Superleggera aluminium bodywork, four seats and sported quad headlamps. Interior featured all the instruments grouped together in the centre console, inspired by aviation. The "Praho" name was derived from the name of the fishing boats popular in Thailand and affiliated with the cars concave rear window. The car remained the only example made and the Sprint production went to Bertone instead.

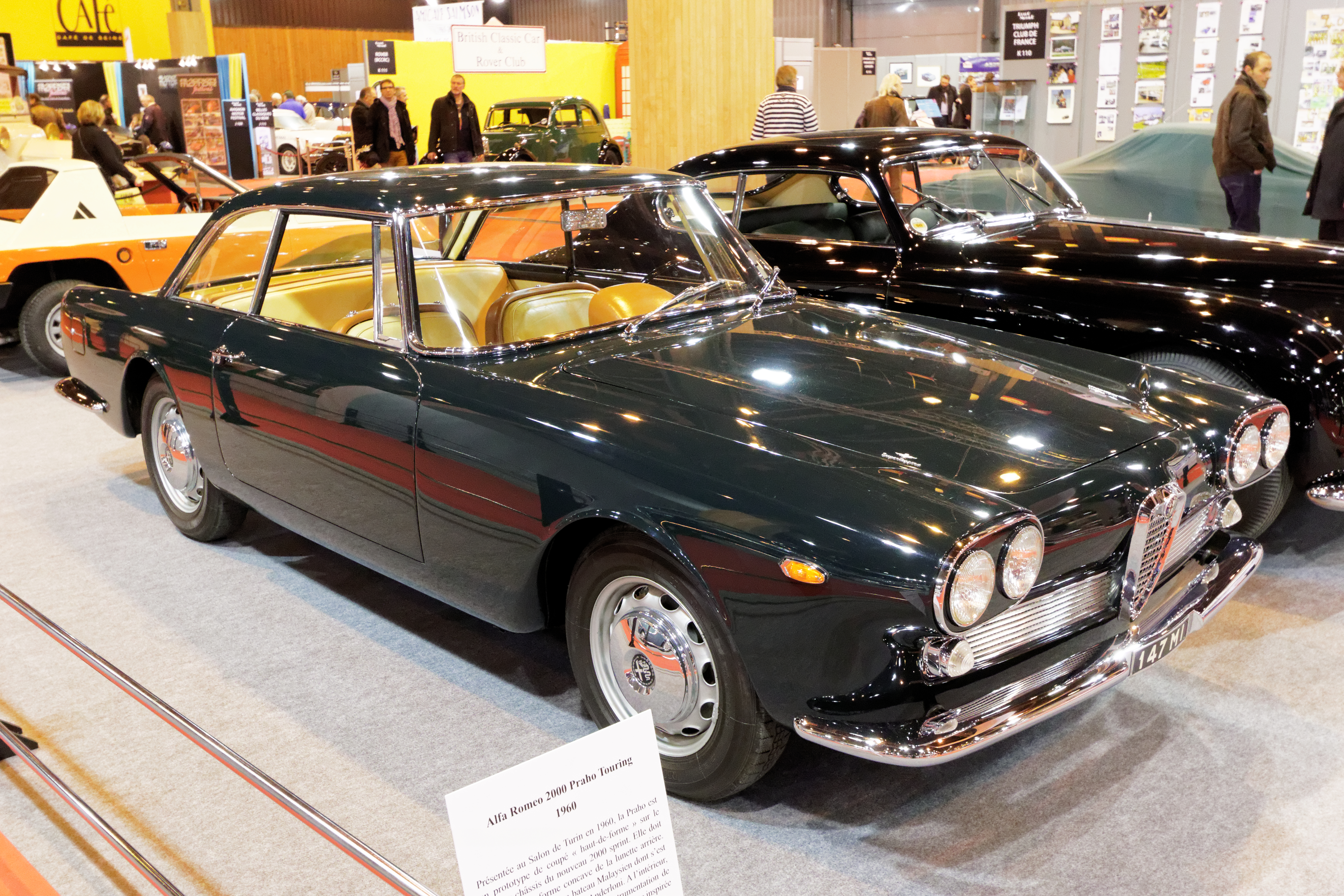
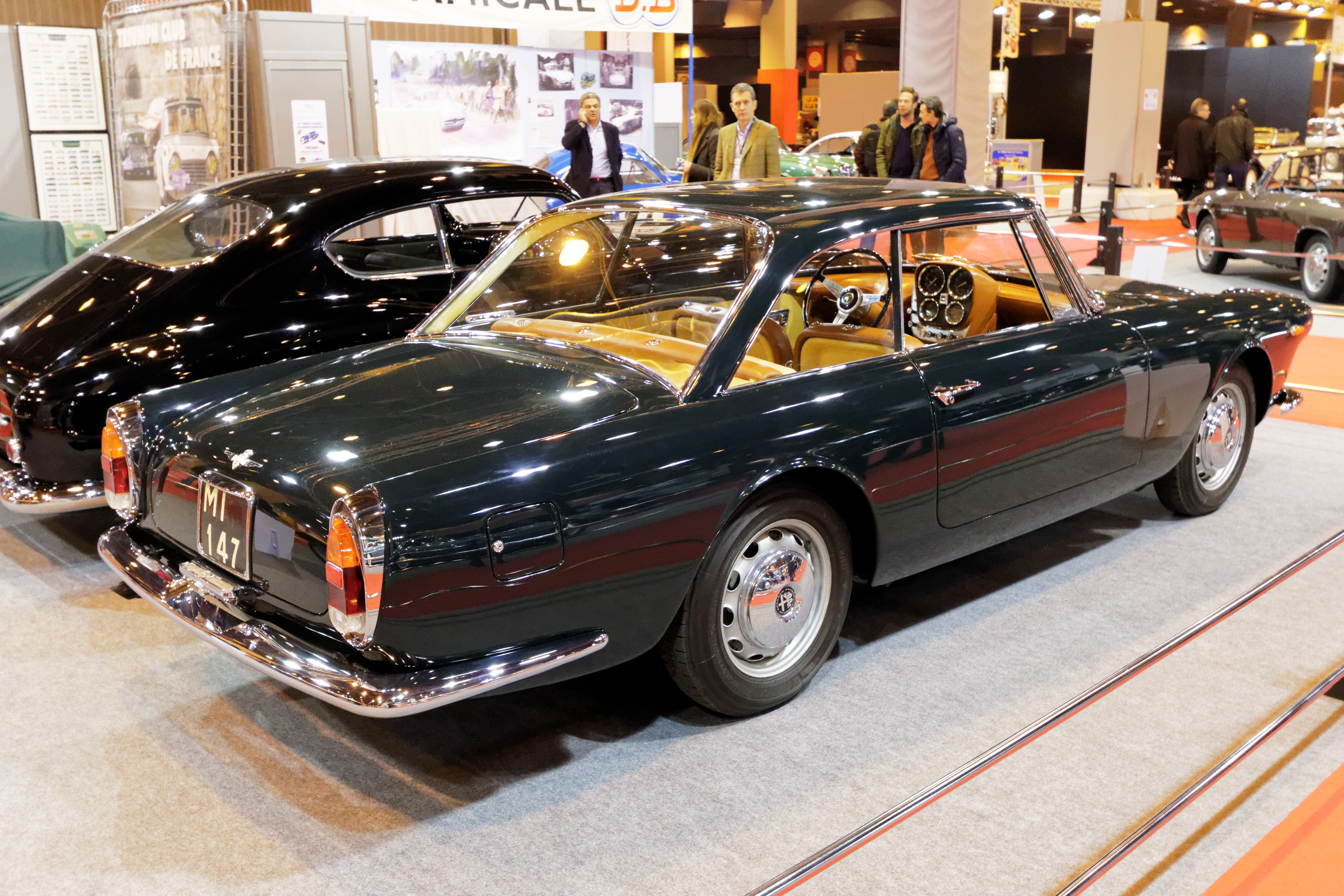
2000 Sprint Praho

== Specifications ==
The 2000 used unibody construction and a conventional front-engine, rear-wheel-drive layout. The engine was an enlarged version of the 1900´s inline-four displacing 1975 cc. The cast iron block and aluminium head engine produced 105 PS (77 kW; 104 hp) at 5300 rpm in Berlina using a single downdraft Solex carburettor, while the version on the Sprint and Spider produced 115 PS (85 kW; 113 hp) at 5700 rpm with two Solex sidedraft carburettors and a higher compression ratio. Two chain-driven overhead camshafts operated two poppet valves per cylinder. Power was sent to the rear wheels through a 5-speed gearbox, with synchromesh on all forward speeds.

Front wheel suspension was independent, with double wishbones, the rear used a solid axle. On all four wheels there were coil springs and telescopic dampers. Brakes were drums, with a hydraulic system. Tyres 165HR400 Pirelli Cinturato CA67

Engines

Model	Displacement	Compr. ratio	Power	Top speed
Berlina	1,975 cc	8.25:1	105 PS (77 kW; 104 hp) at 5300 rpm	161 km/h (100 mph)
Spider/Sprint	1,975 cc	8.5:1	115 PS (85 kW; 113 hp) at 5700 rpm	177 km/h (110 mph)

== Production ==
The four-door Berlina was manufactured by Alfa Romeo itself, while the Spider and Sprint were designed and bodied by independent coachbuilders, respectively Touring and Bertone. Being expensive but not particularly fast, the 2000 was a slow seller, in particular the Berlina which was outsold by the Spider. The more powerful 2600 which replaced the 2000 was better able to deal with more refined competitors such as the Lancia Flaminia.

Between 1958 and 1961, Vignale built a series of coupés, penned by Giovanni Michelotti. All bore chassis type of 102.02, different from the series production cars. Around 15 cars were made. Pinin Farina also offered a custom-bodied coupé, called the 2000 Sestriere, while Bertone offered two coupé designs prior to the introduction of the Sprint - one sporty design and one which was largely a two-door version of the Berlina.

Year	1958	1959	1960	1961	1962	Sum
Berlina	319	787	1,074	619	0	2,799
Spider	62	1,056	1,930	410	0	(including 15 chassis) 3,458
Sprint	0	0	5	651	48	704
Sum	381	1,843	3,009	1,680	48	6,961

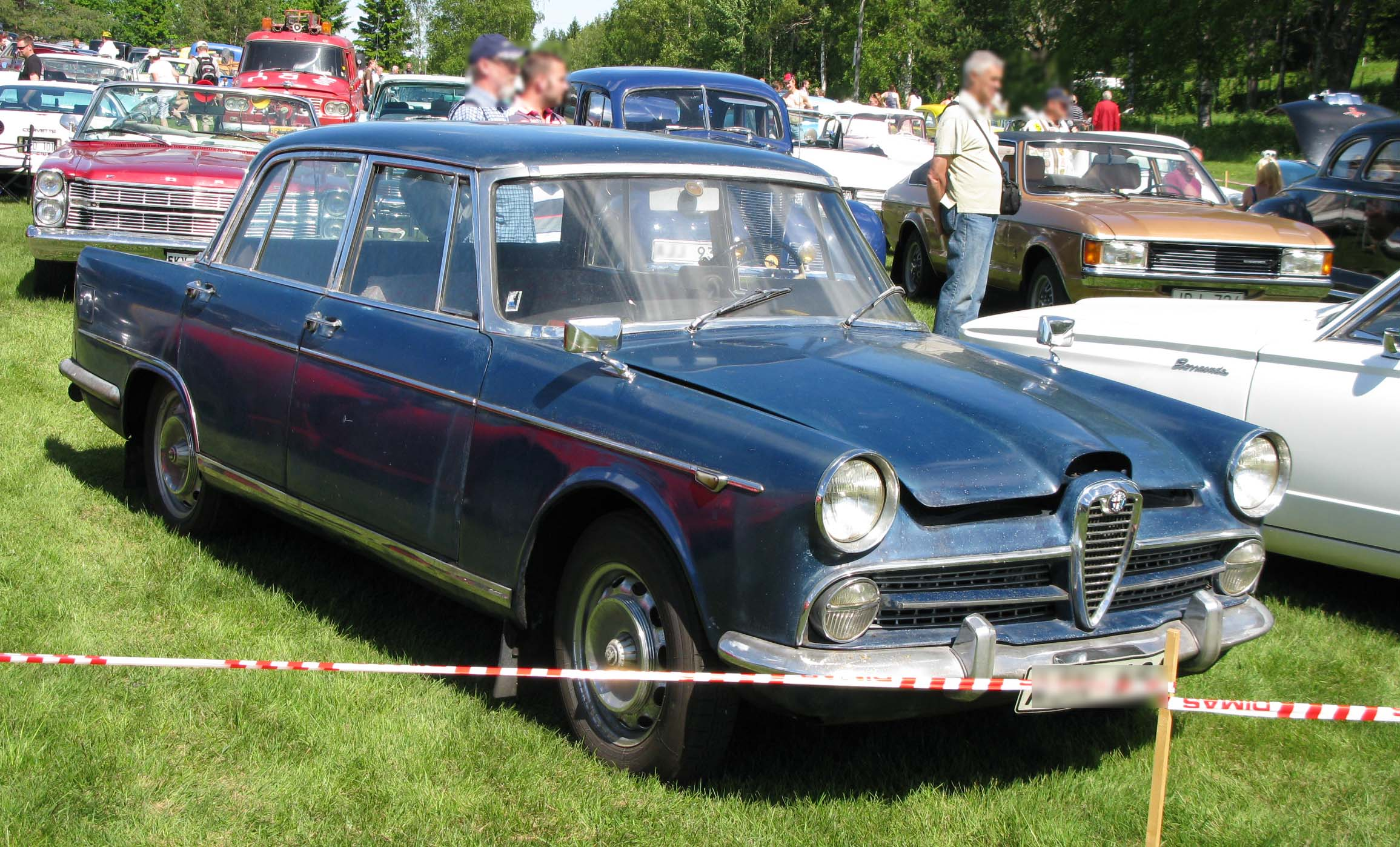
2000 Berlina front side.

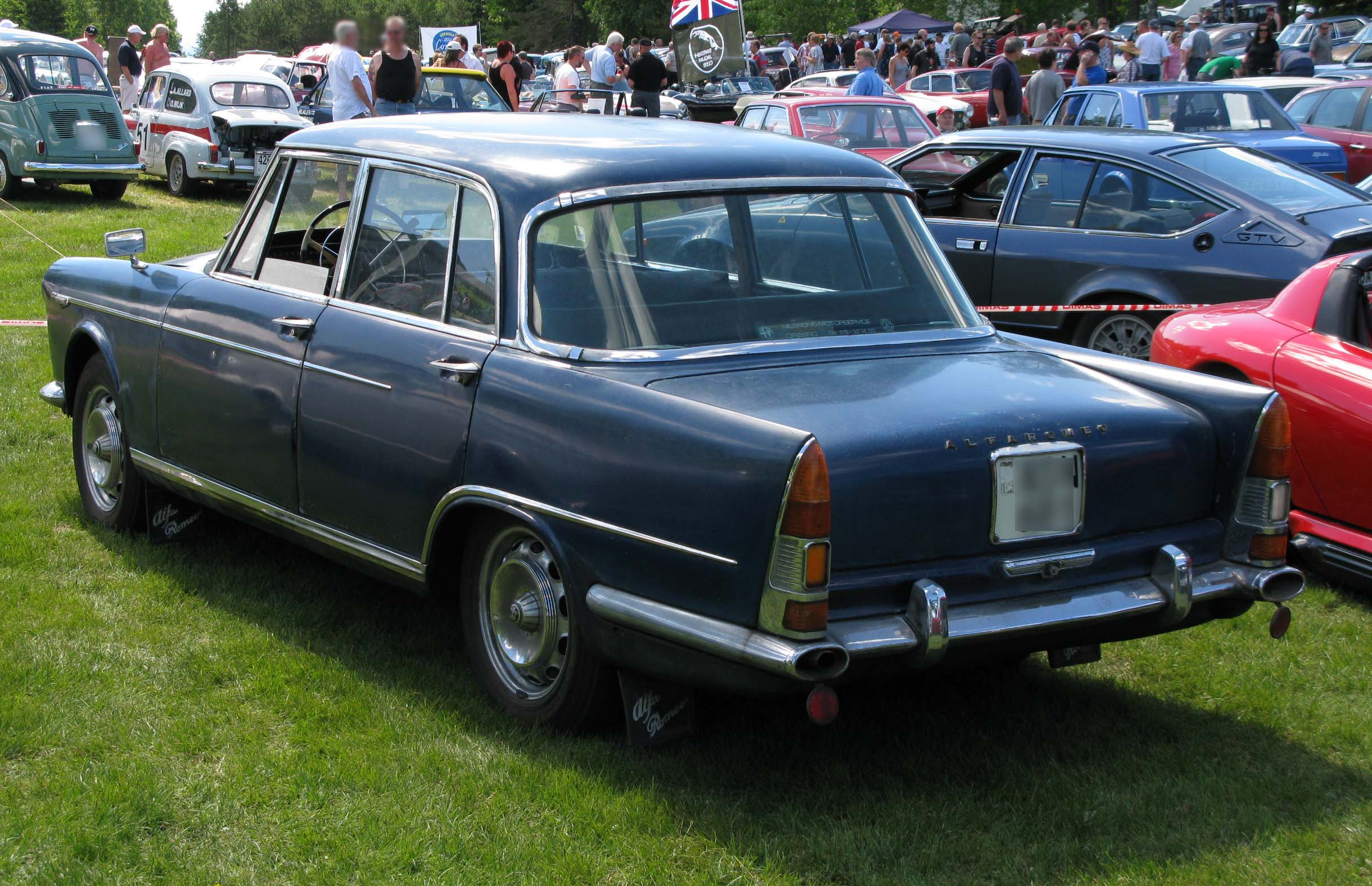
2000 Berlina rear side.

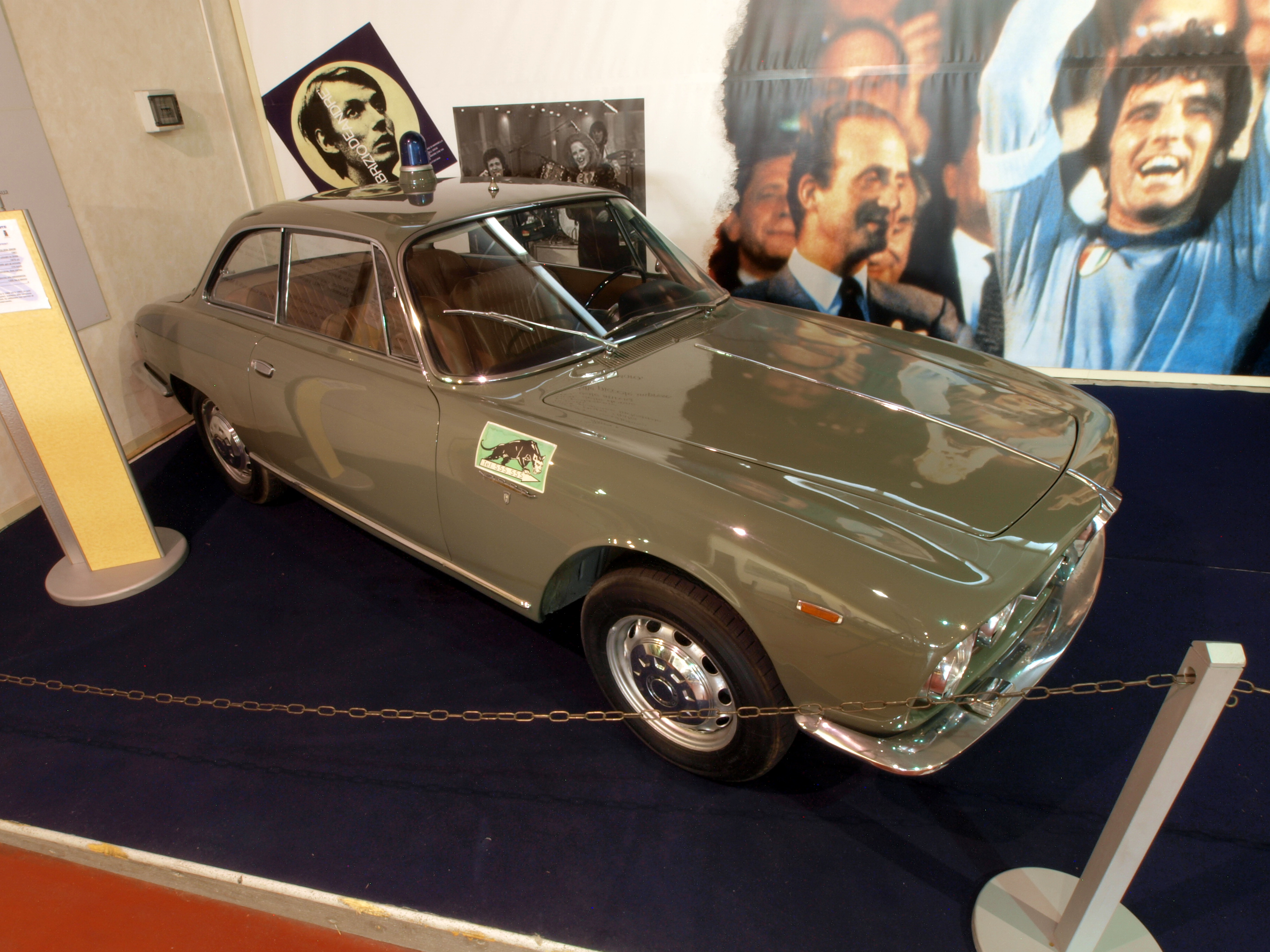
2000 Sprint "Pantera" (Polizia di Stato).

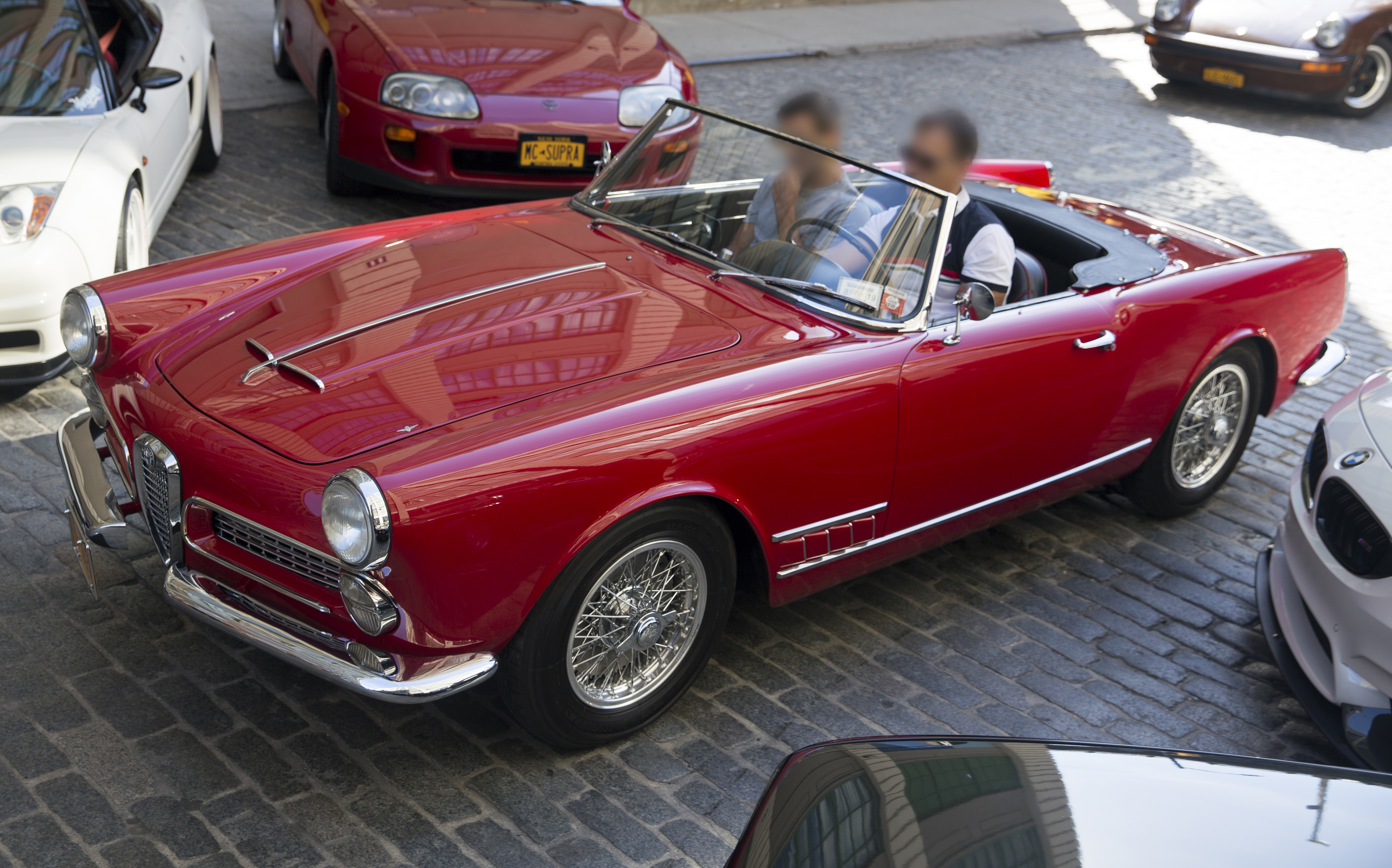
US-market 2000 Spider; different bonnet scoop arrangement and only a single chrome strip along the flanks.

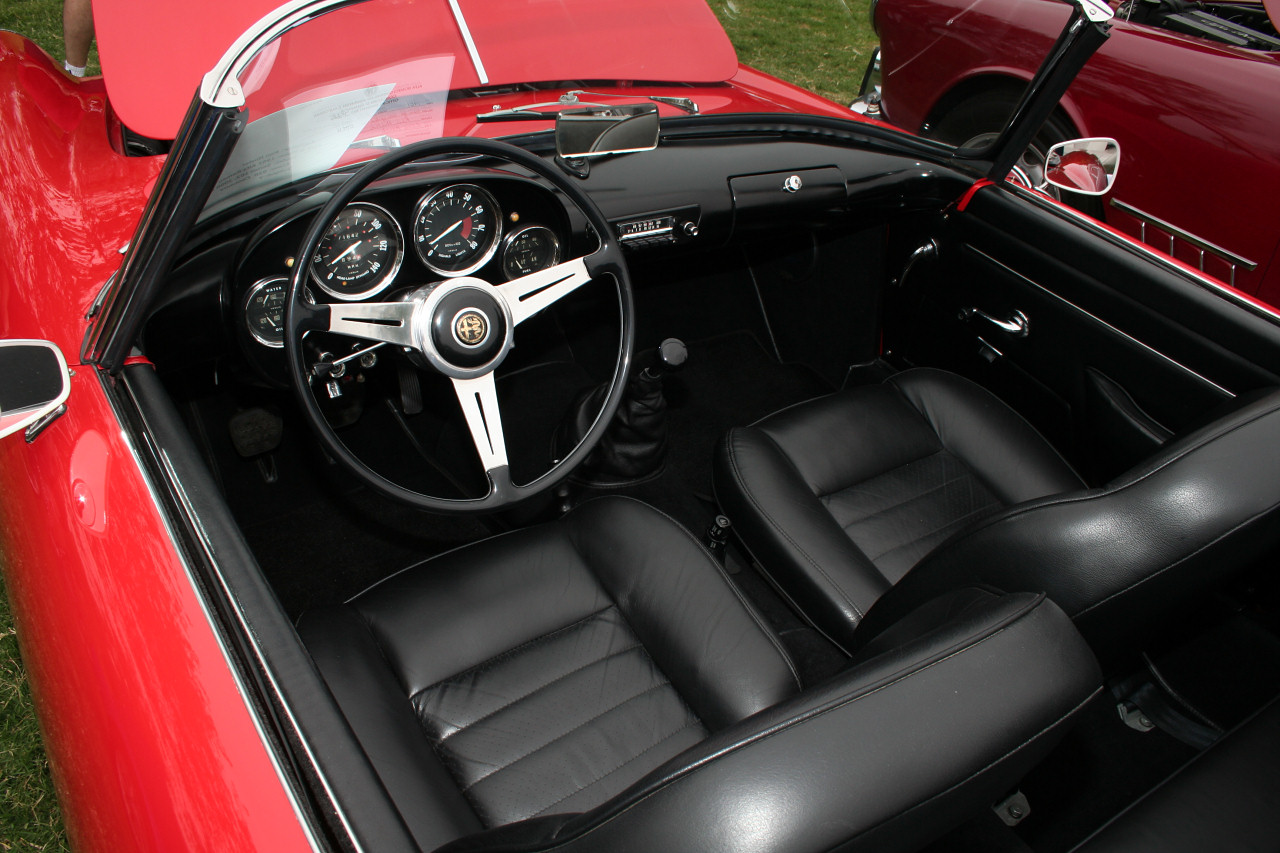
1961 Alfa Romeo 2000 Spider interior

== FNM 2000 ==
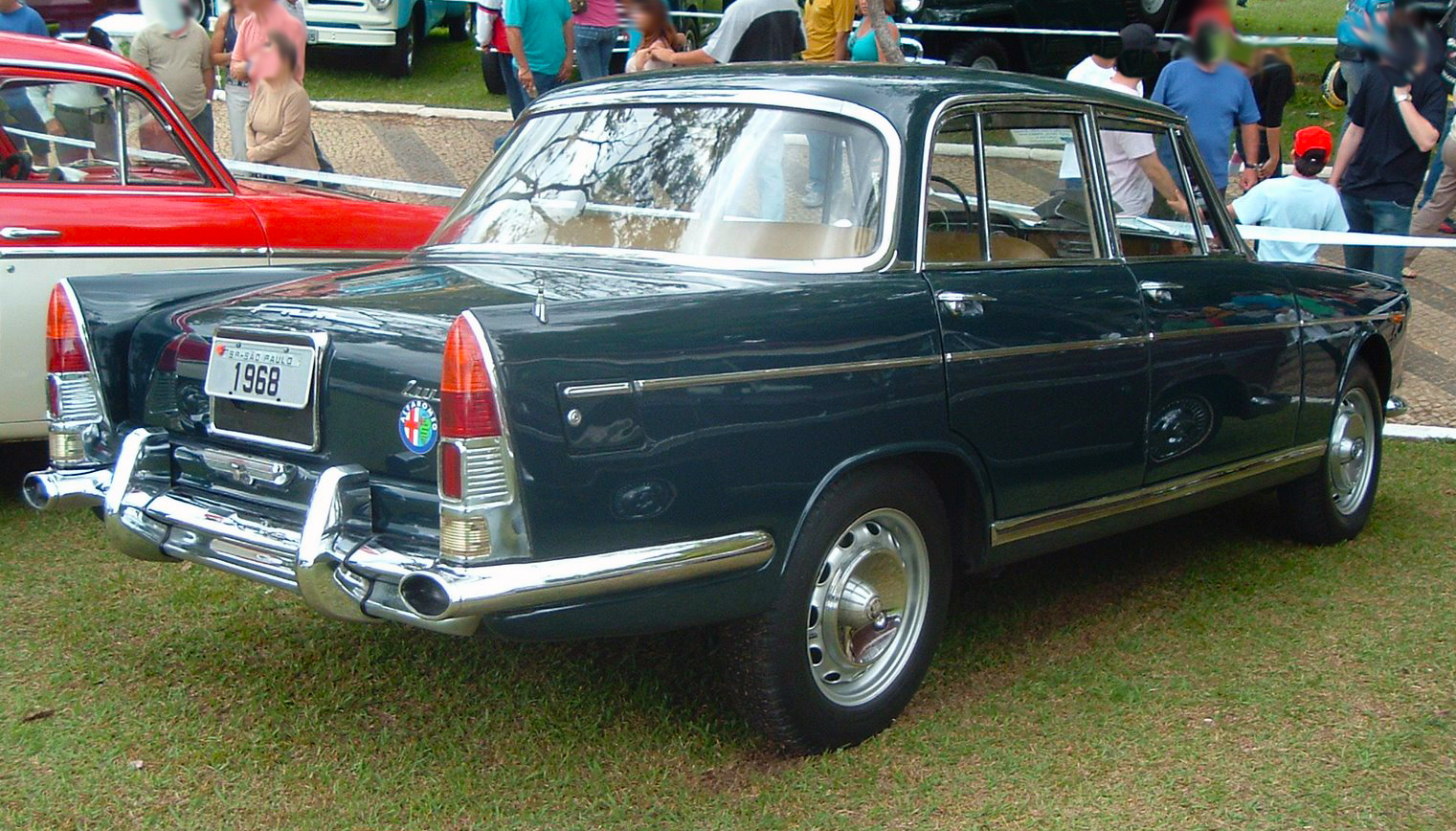
1968 FNM Alfa Romeo 2000

The Brazilian variant of the 2000 was produced from 1960 to 1968 by Fábrica Nacional de Motores. It had the same 1975 cc engine with 95 PS (70 kW; 94 hp). The car used the name FNM "JK", JK standing for the president of Brazil Juscelino Kubitschek, the name was later changed to FNM 2000.

In 1966 two other models were introduced, the "Onça" coupe and the "2000 TiMB" (Turismo Internazionale Modello Brasile), which produced up to 160 PS (118 kW; 158 hp). The TiMB had a flat bonnet, coupled with a divided front bumper necessary to accommodate the now lower-mounted Alfa Romeo centre grille.

== FNM 2150 ==
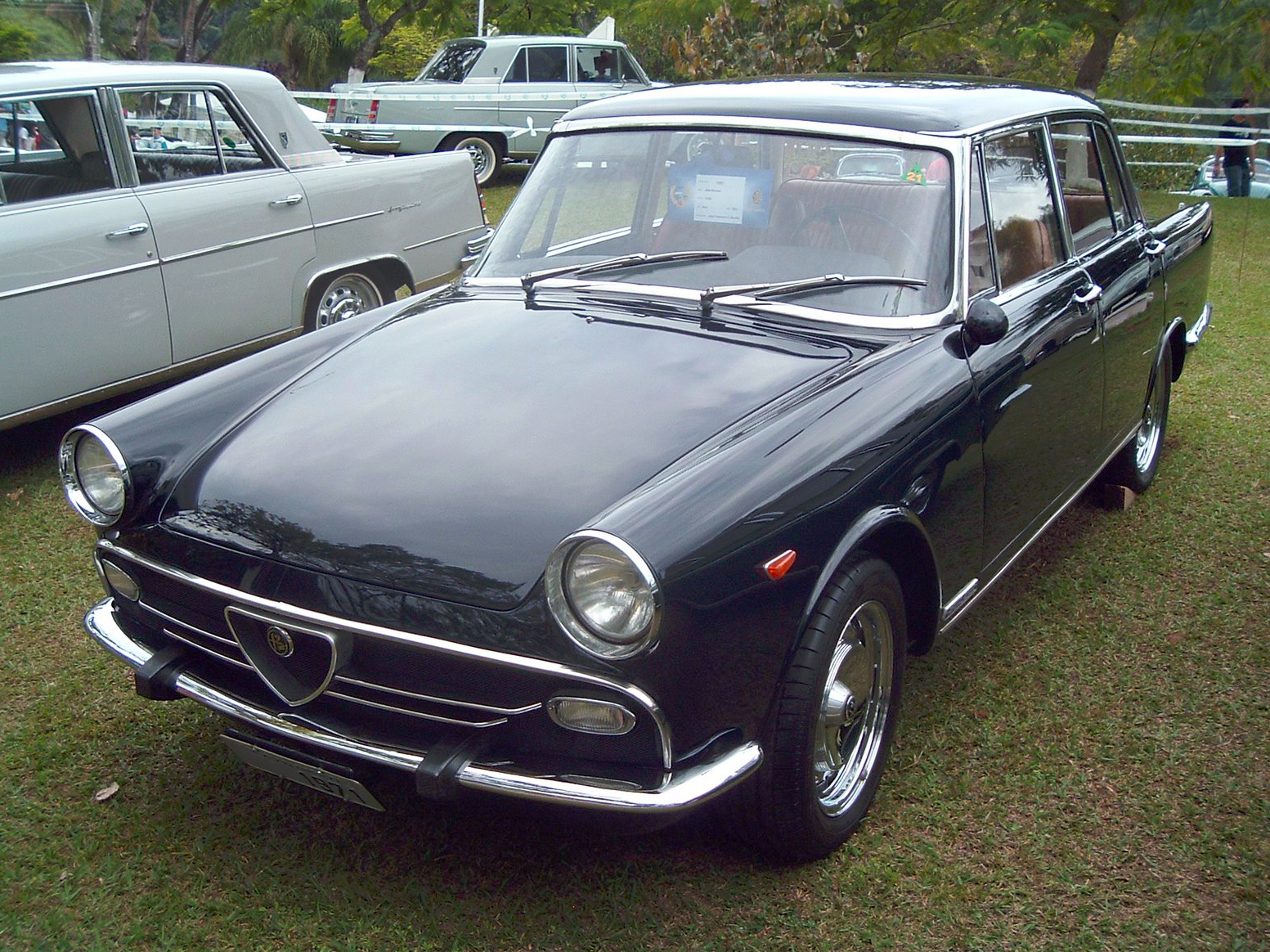
1971 FNM Alfa Romeo 2150 (facelift)

The FNM 2000 was replaced with FNM 2150 in 1969, it had a bigger engine and revised styling, using the smooth bonnet of the TiMB. For 1971 the 2150 was facelifted, with a more squat version of the traditional Alfa Romeo grille which also allowed for a single-piece front bumper. By 1974 the Alfa Romeo Alfetta-lookalike FNM Alfa Romeo 2300 "Rio" replaced the 2150. This version was still based on the older Alfa Romeo 1900, despite looking like the more modern Alfetta.
