= Fábrica Nacional de Motores =

Brazilian manufacturer of engines and motor vehicles

Coordinates: 22°35′41″S 43°17′46″W

- FNM logo, largely inspired by the Alfa Romeo logo
- Industry: Automotive
- Founded: 1942
- Defunct: 1988
- Fate: Sold to Fiat
- Headquarters: Xerém district of Duque de Caxias, Rio de Janeiro
- Products: aircraft engines, ammunition, bicycles, spindles and refrigerators, Automobiles
- Owner: Brazilian State (1942–1968); Alfa Romeo (1968–1973); Fiat (1973–1988)

The Fábrica Nacional de Motores (FNM) was a Brazilian manufacturer of engines and motor vehicles based in the Xerém district of Duque de Caxias near Rio de Janeiro that operated between 1942 and 1988. In 2018, the manufacturer was refounded, changing its name to Fábrica Nacional de Mobilidades (English: "National Factory of Mobilities") based in Rio de Janeiro and producing electric trucks at the Agrale factory in Rio Grande do Sul.

== Origins ==
The company was created 1942 by the Brazilian state as part of the Estado Novo agenda of President Getúlio Vargas. It was one of several business launched by the state during this period (including also Companhia Siderúrgica Nacional launched in 1941 and CHESF in the later 1940s) to kick start an industrial sector in Brazil. Initially the company produced American Curtiss-Wright aircraft engines under license along with ammunition, bicycles, spindles and refrigerators.

After the Second World War it decided to diversify its production. The government was keen to launch a vehicle manufacturing industry. In 1949, an agreement was reached with the Italian manufacturer Isotta Fraschini, whereby FNM would produce the Milanese company's heavy trucks under license. Isotta Fraschini commercial vehicles enjoyed an excellent reputation at this time, but the Italian company was already economically troubled, although its formal bankruptcy would be put off till the end of 1951.

== The Alfa Romeo connection ==
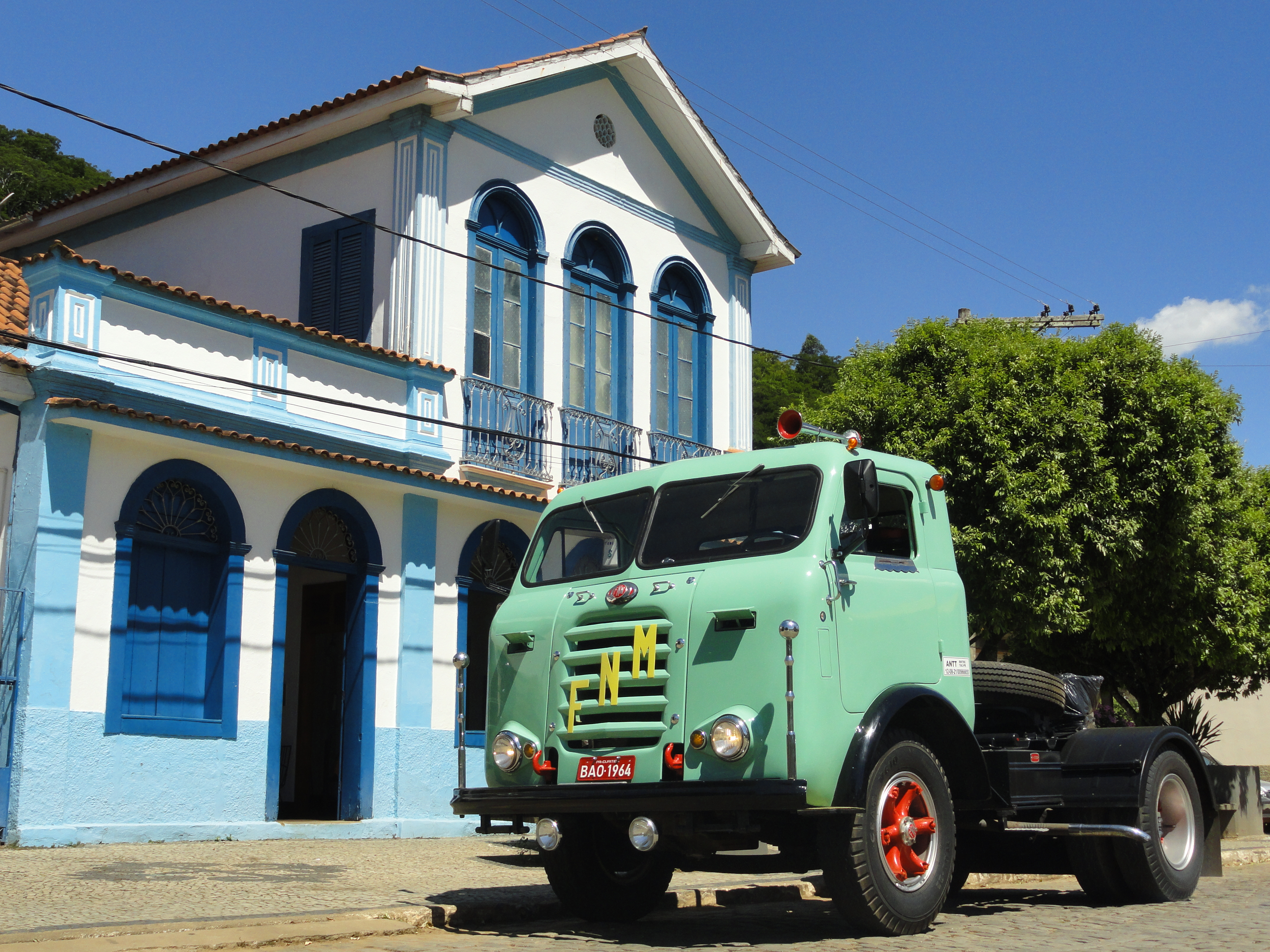
FNM D-11.000 truck, 1964

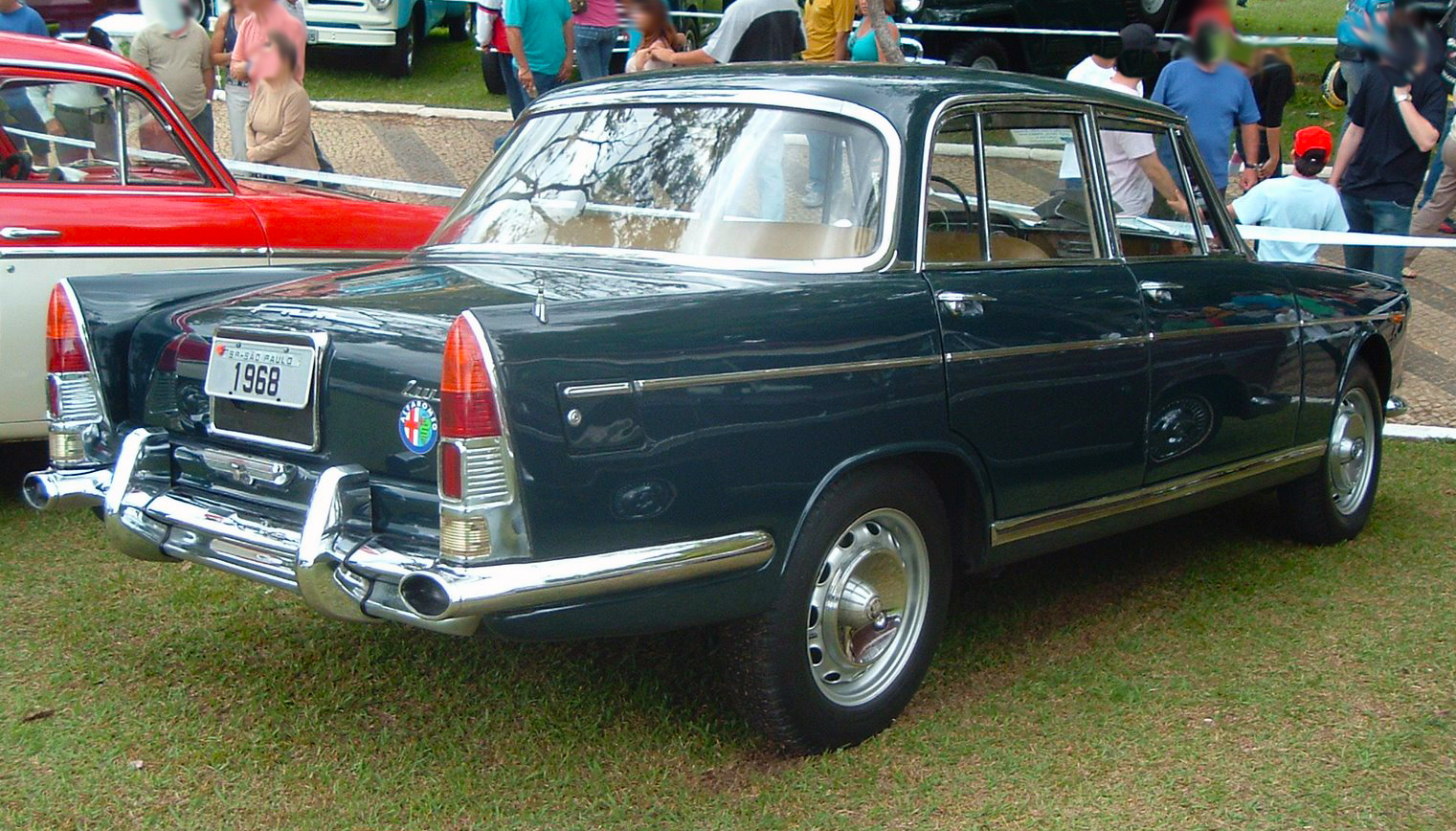
1968 FNM JK 2000

The disappearance of Isotta Fraschini as a vehicle manufacturer left FNM looking for a new technology partner. In 1952, an agreement was signed with Alfa Romeo, another Milanese vehicle manufacturer. Unusually in Europe, Alfa Romeo was (like FNM) a state owned business, following bankruptcy and a government rescue in the 1930s. Under the agreement with Alfa Romeo, FNM would manufacture Alfa Romeo's commercial vehicle range under license. Though little known north of the Alps, Alfa Romeo commercial vehicles were well established in Italy, and other south European markets. Between 1956 and 1960, FNM built more than 15,000 heavy trucks of Alfa Romeo design: it also manufactured the chassis for buses and coaches. In the Brazilian heavy truck sector which FNM dominated till the early 1970s, FNM was initially the only manufacturer. Trucks produced by FNM were generally nicknamed "Fenemê".

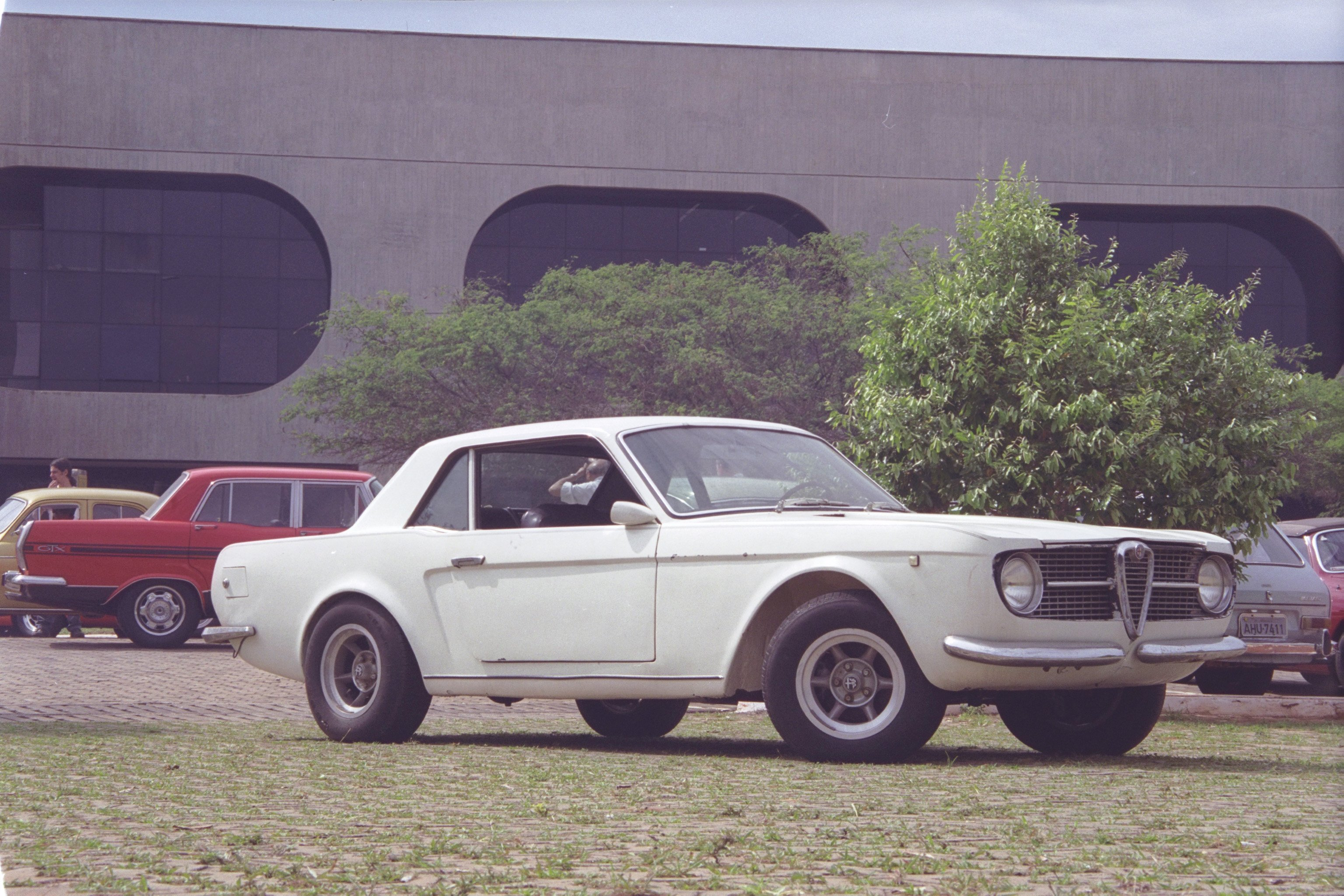
Brazilian made FNM Onça, made by Genaro “Rino” Malzoni in 1966, over an Alfa Romeo platform

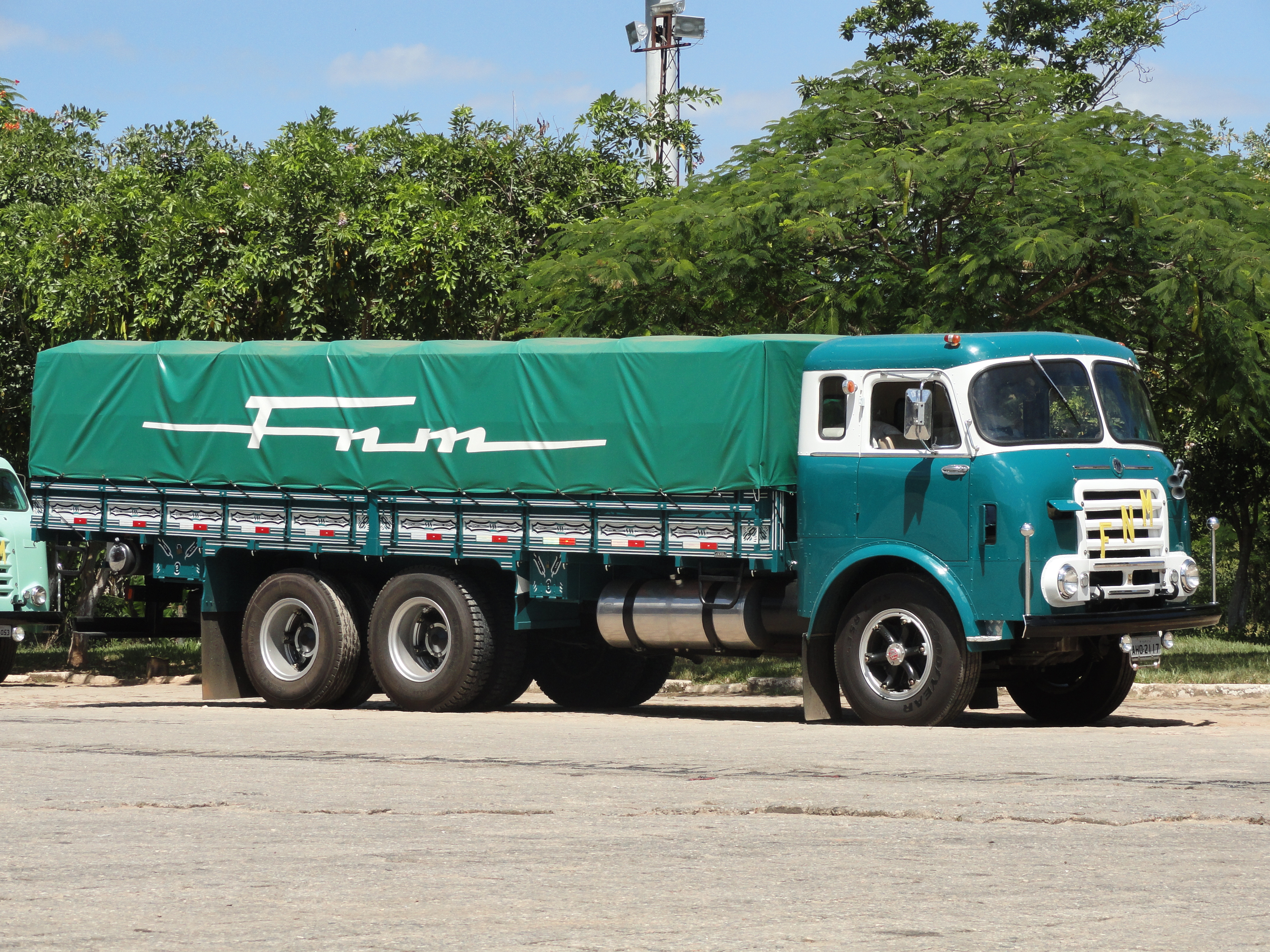
FNM D-11.000 with Brasinca cabin, 1961

In the mid-fifties a company called Fabral S.A. (Fábrica Brasileira de Automóveis Alfa, "the Brazilian Alfa automobile factory"), a collaboration between Alfa Romeo and Brazilian investor Matarazzo, was set up to build the Alfa Romeo 2000 (tipo 102/B, "B" for Brazil). The car was to be built in Jacareí, in the state of São Paulo. The Matarazzo Group backed out in 1958, following troubled discussions about the suitability of building luxurious cars in poor Brazil. After pressure from then-President Juscelino Kubitschek FNM, in which Alfa Romeo already held a minority interest, took over the project. In 1960 FNM's first passenger car was launched, the FNM 2000, a Brazilian version of the series 102 Alfa Romeo 2000 four-door sedan (berlina). The factory ended up being built in the Xerém neighborhood of Duque de Caxias, Rio de Janeiro instead. The engine was the same 1,975 cc twin camshaft unit found in the Italian product, but detuned to produce only 95 PS (70 kW) and the car received the FNM logo. This series of cars was named "J.K." in honor of President Kubitschek who had helped make the deal take place. This was by far the most luxurious, and most expensive, car built in Brazil in the period.

A coupé version was offered from 1966. Known as the FNM Onça ("Jaguar"), the coupé did not follow the line of any Alfa Romeo design, but featured a locally designed body unmistakably reminiscent of the original Ford Mustang. The regular FNM 2000, meanwhile, was followed by more powerful versions, culminating with the 130 PS (96 kW) TIMB ("Turismo Internazional Modelo Brasileiro"), now boasting usefully more power than was claimed for its Alfa Romeo cousins of the time. The TIMB also featured a flat bonnet with a lower-mounted grille, as suggested by Lincoln Tendler aiming a better aerodynamic penetration, and a divided front bumper to accommodate the lower centerpiece. This same front design was also used for the succeeding FNM 2150, with some detail differences.

== Alfa Romeo control ==
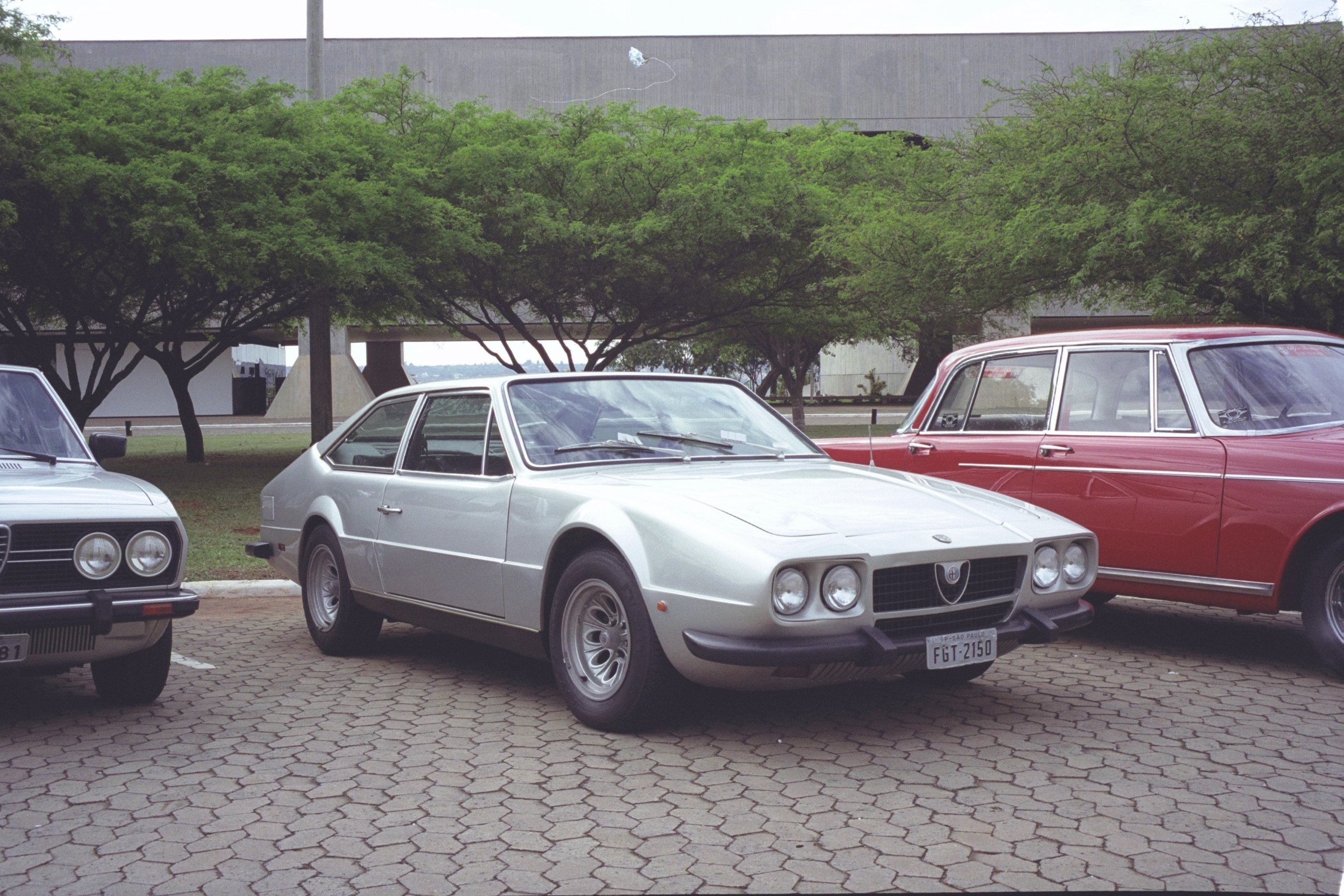
Brazilian made FNM Furia GT, made by Toni Bianco in 1971, over an Alfa Romeo platform

In 1968, Alfa Romeo acquired a controlling share in the hitherto state-owned FNM business. The next year the FNM 2000 was replaced by a restyled version, the FNM 2150, the most obvious visual differences affecting the front of the car. For this application the twin camshaft four cylinder engine saw its capacity increased to 2132 cc, and performance was further enhanced through the installation of a better set of carburetors. The five-speed gearbox was the same one used in all cars made up to that moment. The FNM 2150 would continue in production from 1969 till 1974.

In 1971, another coupé called the Furia GT 2150 was presented to the public. Based on chassis and mechanics of the FNM/JK 2150 cc model, the car was designed by Brazilian designer Toni Bianco. Only a few hand built examples were produced, but the stylish coupé may have helped the public image of the by now aging design of the mainstream FNM 2150. Bianco later made some sporting creations carrying his own name.

Alfa Romeo had disposed of its commercial vehicle operations in Italy in the 1960s, and in 1973 the FNM commercial vehicle business was sold to Fiat's industrial vehicle division, while Alfa Romeo retained responsibility for the FNM automobile business – subsequently FNM's commercial vehicle business ended up being absorbed into Fiat's Brazilian Iveco business.

== Closing chapter ==
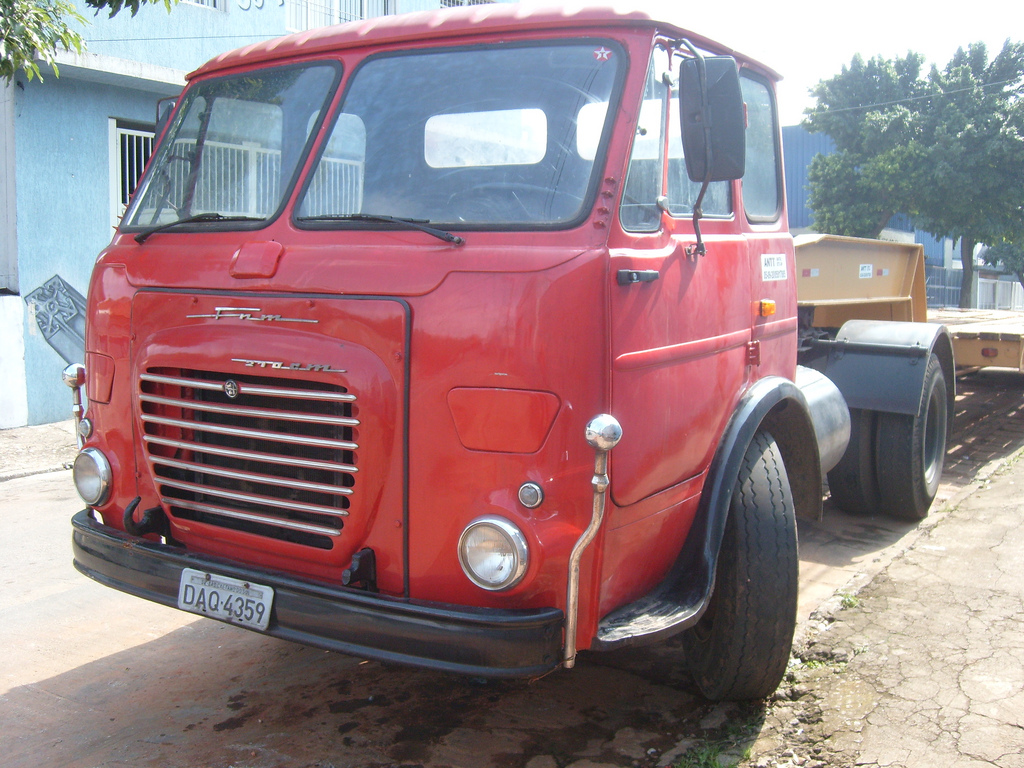
The FNM 210 clearly shows its Alfa Romeo origins in design.

In 1974, saw the FNM 2150 replaced with the Alfa Romeo 2300. This was the end for the FNM badged cars: the FNM badge itself, obviously inspired by the Alfa Romeo badge, was also replaced on this car with an actual Alfa Romeo badge. The general look of the new car was very similar to that of the Italian built Alfetta sedan, designed by Giuseppe Scarnati and first offered in Europe in 1972, although the Brazilian car was actually 41 centimetres (16 in) longer and 7 centimetres (2.8 in) wider than the Alfetta. Under the skin, the 2300 was based technically on the older Alfa Romeo 1900. The gear box of the 2300 was conventionally located adjacent to the engine and not (as with the Alfetta) across the rear axle. Like its Brazilian predecessor the 2300 featured a four-cylinder twin-camshaft engine, now of 2310 cc with a claimed output of 140 hp (100 kW). A maximum speed of 170 km/h (106 mph) was claimed. For the 1985 model year, the 2300 was renamed as "Alfa Romeo 85". This model was manufactured until November 1986.

Marketing opportunities were identified in Europe where Alfa Romeo's locally designed attempt to move upmarket had made little impact on the competition from Bavaria: the Brazilian Alfa Romeo was offered briefly in 1981, under the designation Alfa Rio and distributed by Alfa Romeo Germany. Additionally, around 600 of the cars were shipped to The Netherlands.

== Final years ==
Alfa Romeo faced difficulties in Europe during the late 1970s and early 1980s, coming under increasing commercial pressure from the three largest German up-market auto producers (BMW, Mercedes-Benz, and Audi), even in Italy. Objective financial data concerning nationalized businesses are seldom published, but Alfa Romeo is believed to have operated at a substantial loss for much of its time under state control: in 1986, Romano Prodi who was at the time chairman of the IRI (the government body responsible for nationalised industries in Italy), wishing to reduce the losses of the IRI, transferred Alfa Romeo to the private sector, which in Italy's mass market automobile business meant at this time Fiat.

Since 1976, Fiat had been developing its own Brazilian operation, based in Betim. The Brazilian-based car business that had formerly comprised FNM was accordingly integrated into Fiat's own Brazilian operation, and in 1988, the FNM badged commercial vehicles – already produced by a Fiat owned business since Alfa Romeo sold the business in 1973 – were rebadged as Iveco products.

== Automobile production volumes ==
Production volumes of the FNM 2000/2150, to the extent these can be determined:

- 1966: 474
- 1967: 714
- 1968:
- 1969: 555
- 1970: 1,209
- 1971: ~800
- 1972: 525
- 1978: 4,017
- 1979: 2,350

=== Models manufactured ===
==== Trucks ====
- FNM D-7300
- FNM D-9500
- FNM D-11000
- FNM 180
- FNM 210

==== Passenger cars ====
- 1960–1968 FNM 2000 J.K.
- 1966 FNM 2000 Onça
- 1966 FNM 2000 TiMB
- 1968–1972 FNM 2150
- 1974–1977 Alfa Romeo 2300
- 1977–1980 Alfa Romeo 2300 B
- 1978–1986 Alfa Romeo 2300 ti
- 1980–1986 Alfa Romeo 2300 sl
- 1980–1986 Alfa Romeo 2300 ti4

== Automobile technical data ==
Technical data FNM 2000/Onça/2150/2300
FNM:	2000	2000 TIMB	Onca	2150	2300 (1975)	2300 ti (1975)	2300 ti4 (1985)
Engine:	Straight-4 (four stroke)						
Displacement:	1,975 cc (120.5 cu in)			2,131 cc (130.0 cu in)	2,310 cc (141 cu in)		
Bore x Stroke:	84,5 x 88 mm			84,5 x 95 mm	88 x 95 mm		
Power /rpm:	70 kW (95 PS) at 5400	77 kW (105 PS) at 5700	85 kW (115 PS) at 5900	81 kW (110 PS) at 5700	103 kW (140 hp SAE) at 5700	110 kW (149 SAE-PS) at 5700	95 kW (130 PS) at 5500
Max. Torque /rpm:	153 N⋅m (113 ft⋅lbf) at 3600			167 N⋅m (123 ft⋅lbf) at 3900	214 N⋅m (158 ft⋅lbf) at 3500	235 N⋅m (173 ft⋅lbf) at 3500	235 N⋅m (173 ft⋅lbf) at 3500
Fuel system:	1 downdraft double carburetor Solex 35 APAIG	2 carburetors Solex 44 PHH		1 downdraft double carburetor Solex 35 APAIG	1 double carburetor	2 double carburetors	1 double carburetor
Valve gear:	DOHC, chain						
Cooling:	Water cooling						
Transmission:	5-speed gearbox	5-speed gearbox					
Front wheel suspension:	Unequal-length wishbones, coil springs						
Rear wheel suspension:	semi-trailing arm, coil springs						
Brakes:	Four-wheel drum brakes				Disc brakes in front, drums in the back		Disc brakes all around
Steering:	Worm and Roller						
Body:	steel, self-supporting						
Track front/rear:	1,400 mm (55.1 in)/1,370 mm (53.9 in)				1,397 mm (55.0 in)/1,400 mm (55.1 in)		
Wheelbase:	2,720 mm (107.1 in); Onca: 2,500 mm (98.4 in)				2,730 mm (107.5 in)		
Dimensions:	4,715 mm (185.6 in) x 1,700 mm (66.9 in) x 1,450 mm (57.1 in) mm Onca: 4,425 mm (174.2 in) x 1,670 mm (65.7 in) x 1,290 mm (50.8 in)				4,690 mm (184.6 in)/4,719 mm (185.8 in) x 1,692 mm (66.6 in) x 1,362 mm (53.6 in)		
Unloaded weight:	1,360 kg (3,000 lb); Onca: 1,100 kg (2,400 lb)						1,412 kg (3,113 lb)
Top speed:	155 km/h (96 mph)	165 km/h (103 mph)	175 km/h (109 mph)	165 km/h (103 mph)	170 km/h (110 mph)	175 km/h (109 mph)	170 km/h (110 mph)
0–100 km/h:	not indicated						12,0 s
Consumption (Liter/100 Kilometer):	10.5 L/100 km (27 mpg_{‑imp}; 22 mpg_{‑US})				not indicated		
