= Fábrica Nacional de Mobilidades =

Brazilian truck manufacturer

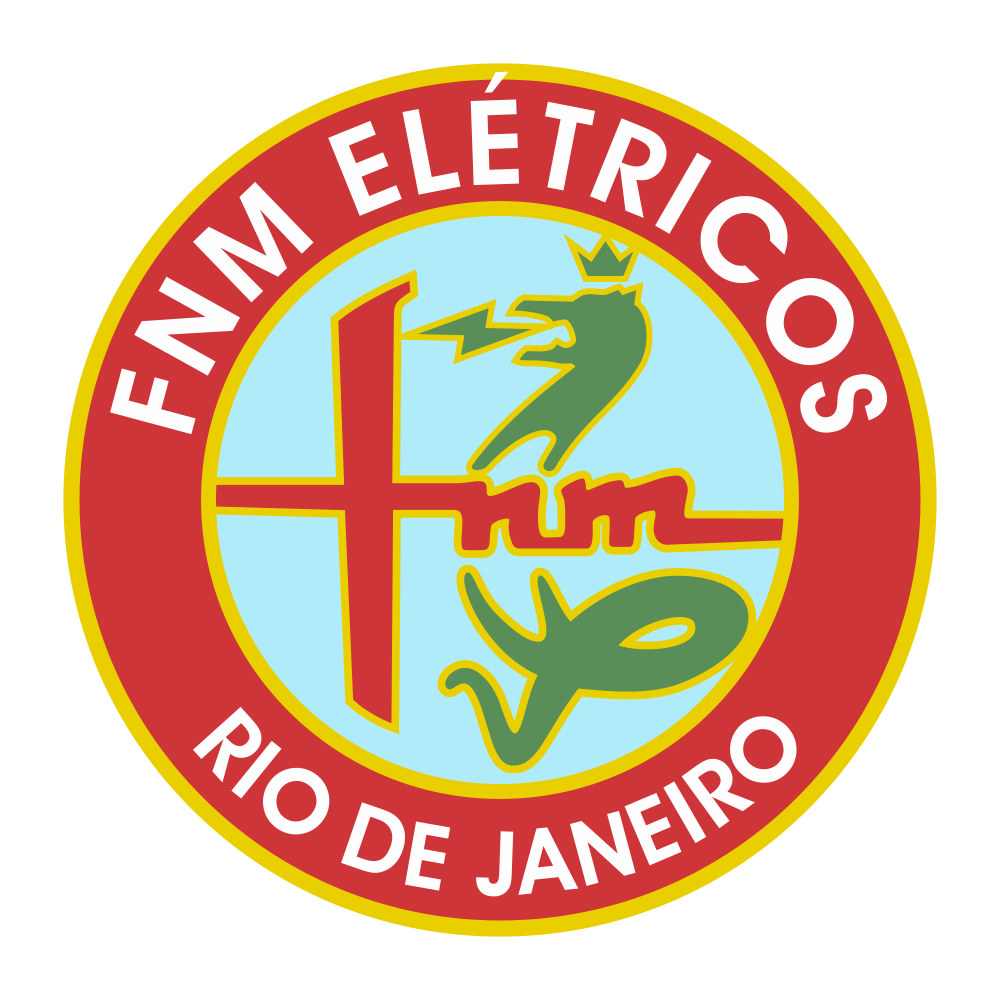
- Company type: Sociedade Anônima
- Industry: Automotive
- Founded: 2018; 8 years ago
- Headquarters: Rio de Janeiro, Brazil
- Products: Trucks; Bus Chassis; Engines; Vans
- Website: www.fnm.rio

The Fábrica Nacional de Mobilidades, shortened FNM Elétricos, is a Brazilian automotive manufacturer headquartered in the city of Rio de Janeiro. FNM produces electric trucks in Caxias do Sul, in Rio Grande do Sul.

== History ==
In 2018, a company acquired the rights to use the name and logo of the defunct National Engine Factory – FNM, from the National Institute of Industrial Property (INPI), to use them in a series of electric trucks. In the new version, the acronym now stands for "Fábrica Nacional de Mobilidades".

FNM is designing vehicles with zero gas emissions. Developing the RePower system, which consists in transforming fossil-fuel vehicles into electric ones.

The production of the vehicles occurs in partnership with Agrale, from Caxias do Sul, which already has expertise in developing and manufacturing trucks, tractors, and bus chassis. The first models to leave the factory are the FNM 832, with a total gross weight of 13 tons, and the FNM 833, with a gross weight of 18 tons.

Although they have nothing to do with the old manufacturer, the cabins of the vehicles have a retro look, in a contemporary reinterpretation of the "Fenemês" manufactured in the 1960s.

The trucks feature a tablet connected to operational IT and logistics systems, collision avoidance cameras with artificial intelligence, lane change system, and driver alerts, representing an example of application of artificial intelligence in the Brazilian industry. It will be ready to be an autonomous vehicle when technology allows. The electric motor has a 650-volt system and a power equivalent to 355 hp, while the reported autonomy is 130 kilometers, with an urban vocation for medium deliveries. Components such as batteries, motors, and the digital system will be imported from Finland, China, and the United States.

In 2019, the company was selected by Ambev, along with other brands in the automotive industry, to manufacture 1000 units of the FNM 833 for urban use by the company, with the first 100 delivered in 2021.

== Current models ==
=== Trucks ===
- FNM 831
- FNM 832
- FNM 833
- FNM 836

=== Vans ===
- FNM 837
- FNM 838

=== Minibus ===
- FNM 834
