= List of Lamborghini concept vehicles =

The following is a list of concept automobiles that carry the name of Italian automaker Lamborghini, listed in chronological order of their presentation.

Car	Year shown	Venue	Design	Engine	Image
350GTV	1963	Turin Auto Show	Franco Scaglione	V12	
350 GTS (or 350 GT Spyder)	1965	Turin Auto Show	Touring	V12	
3500 GTZ	1965	British International Motor Show	Zagato	V12	
Flying Star II	1966	Turin Auto Show	Touring	V12	
400 GT Monza	1967	Barcelona Motor Show	Carrozzeria Neri & Bonacini	V12	
Marzal	1967	Geneva Motor Show	Marcello Gandini / Bertone	Straight 6	
Roadster	1968	Brussels Auto Show	Bertone	V12	
Bravo	1974	Turin Auto Show	Marcello Gandini / Bertone	V8	
Cheetah	1977	Geneva Motor Show	Lamborghini	Chrysler V8	
Faena	1978	Turin Auto Show	Pietro Frua	V12	
Athon	1980	Turin Auto Show	Marc Deschamps / Bertone	V8	
LM001	1981	Geneva Motor Show	Lamborghini	AMC V8	
LMA002	1982	Geneva Motor Show	Lamborghini	V12	
Marco Polo	1982	Bologna Motor Show	Giorgetto Giugiaro / Italdesign	none	
LM003	1982	Announced, but not shown	Lamborghini	VM Motori straight-5 Diesel	
LM004	1986	Autocar, May 1986	Lamborghini	V12 marine engine	
Portofino	1987	Frankfurt Motor Show	Chrysler	V8	
Bertone Genesis	1988	Turin Auto Show	Bertone	V12	
P140	1988	Turin Auto Show	Marcello Gandini	V10	
Sogna	1991		Ryoji Yamazaki	V12	
Diablo Roadster Prototype	1992	Geneva Motor Show			
Calà	1995	Geneva Motor Show	Giorgetto Giugiaro / Italdesign	V10	
Acosta	1996	n/a	Marcello Gandini	V12	
Zagato Raptor	1996	Geneva Motor Show	Norihiko Harada / Zagato	V12	
Canto	1997	n/a	Norihiko Harada / Zagato	V12	
Pregunta	1998	1998 Paris Motor Show	Heuliez	V12	
Coatl	2000		Lamborghini Latinoamérica S.A.	V12	
Concept S	2005	Geneva Motor Show	Luc Donckerwolke / Lamborghini	V10	
Miura concept	2006	Museum of Television & Radio	Walter de Silva / Lamborghini	V12	
Alar	2008	N/A	Lamborghini	V12	
Estoque	2008	Paris Motor Show	Filippo Perini / Lamborghini	V10	
5-95 Zagato	2012		Norihiko Harada / Zagato	V10	
Urus	2012	Auto China	Filippo Perini / Lamborghini	V10	
Egoista	2013	Grande Giro di Italia	Walter de Silva / Lamborghini	V10	
Asterion	2014	Paris Motor Show	Lamborghini Centro Stile	V10/PHEV	
Terzo Millennio	2017	EmTech Technology Conference	Lamborghini / Massachusetts Institute of Technology	Simultaneously storing and discharging high-performance supercapacitor	
Huracán Sterrato	2019	-	Lamborghini Centro Stile	V10	
Lambo V12 Vision Gran Turismo	2019	2019 Gran Turismo Sport World Championships	Lamborghini Centro Stile	V12 Hybrid	
Lanzador	2023	Pebble Beach Concours d'Elegance.	Lamborghini Centro Stile	2x Electric Motors	
Manifesto	2025	Centro Stile	Lamborghini		
