= Lamborghini Lanzador =

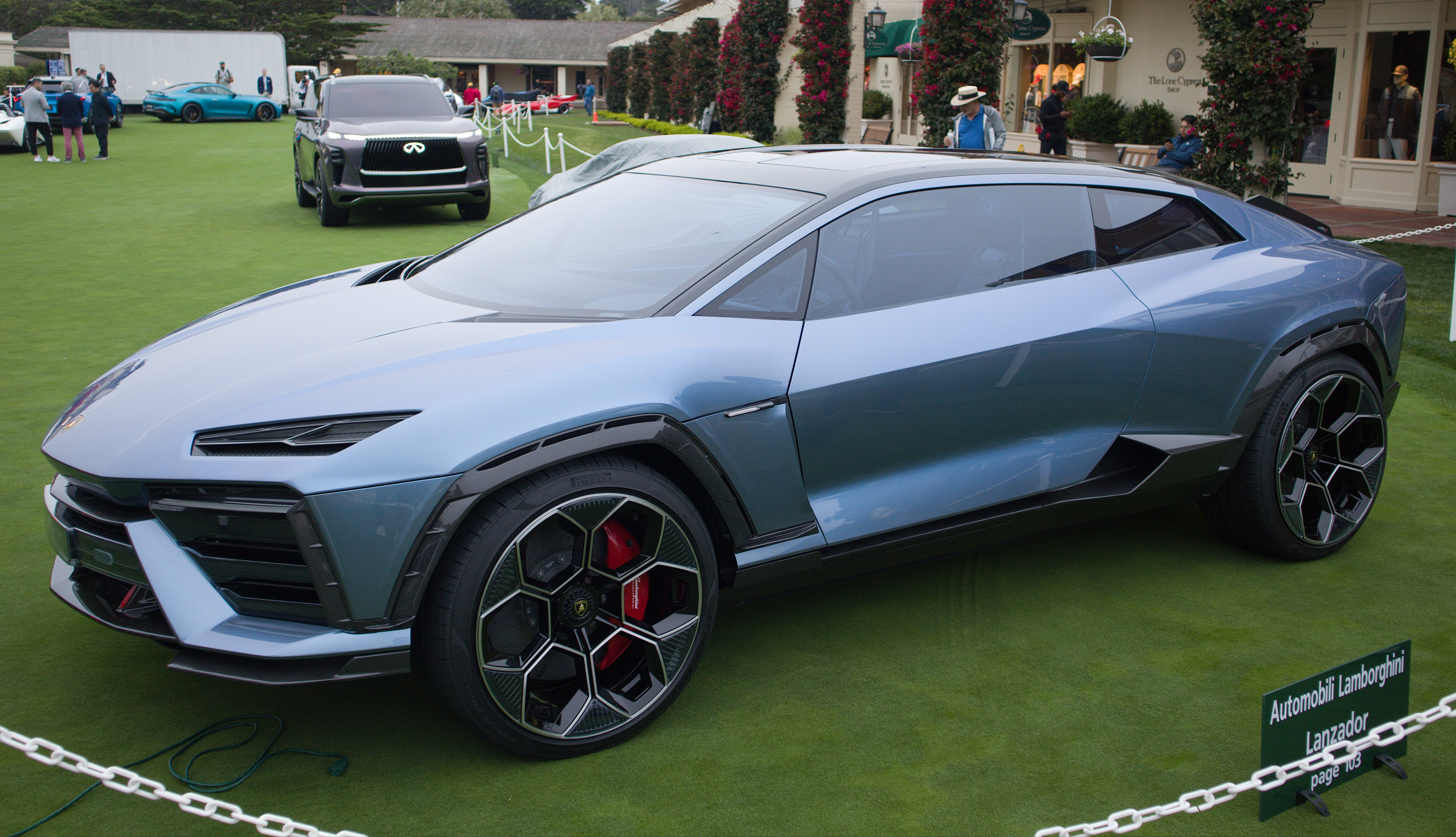

Overview
- Manufacturer: Lamborghini
- Production: 2029 (to commence)
- Model years: 2030
- Designer: Mitja Borkert; Saša Čudić; Manuele Amprimo; Luca Proglio

Body and chassis
- Class: Concept car
- Body style: Two-door coupé
- Layout: Double-motor all-wheel drive
- Doors: 2

Powertrain
- Electric motor: Two electric motors mounted on each axle

The Lamborghini Lanzador is an electric concept car developed by Italian automobile manufacturer Lamborghini. It was set to be the company's first production electric vehicle and it was scheduled to enter production in 2028, but was cancelled in 2026 and shifted to become hybrid.

== Overview ==
The Lanzador concept was presented on 18 August 2023, at Monterey Car Week during the Pebble Beach Concours d'Elegance.

The Lanzador is an SUV-like 2+2 coupé with significant ground clearance.

== Specifications ==
The Lanzador features originally included two electric motors that are located on both axles. But this was shifted to a hybrid system with the overhaul announced in 2026.

== See also ==
- List of Lamborghini concept vehicles
