= Lamborghini Terzo Millennio =

2017 electric concept car

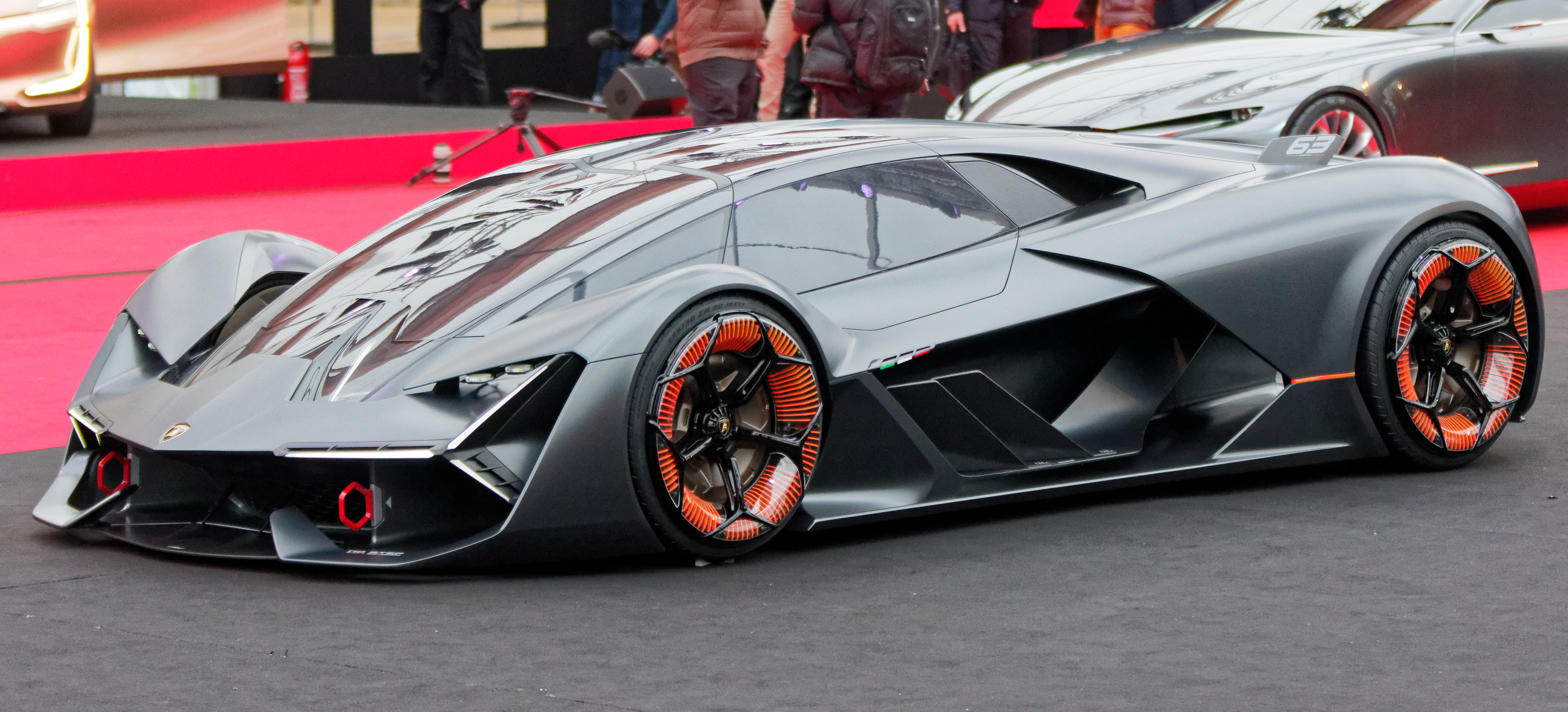

Overview
- Manufacturer: Lamborghini; Massachusetts Institute of Technology
- Production: 2017
- Designer: Mitja Borkert

Body and chassis
- Class: Concept car (S)
- Body style: Hatch-top coupé
- Layout: Quadruple-motor all-wheel drive

Powertrain
- Electric motor: 4 e-motors mounted on each wheel

The Lamborghini Terzo Millennio (Italian for Third Millennium) is a futuristic electric concept car introduced by Italian automobile manufacturer Lamborghini and developed in collaboration with the Massachusetts Institute of Technology (MIT). It is the first product of a three-year, £100,000,000 partnership among the two institutions. The Terzo Millennio was unveiled in November 2017 at the EmTech conference in Cambridge, Massachusetts, United States.

== Overview ==
Collaborating with MIT for our R&D department is an exceptional opportunity to do what Lamborghini has always been very good at: rewriting the rules on super sports cars. Now we are presenting an exciting and progressive concept car. We are inspired by embracing what is impossible today to craft the realities of tomorrow: Lamborghini must always create the dreams of the next generation.

— Chairman Stefano Domenicali, EmTech Conference

The design of the Terzo Millennio is considered part of the "Gandini Line" and is the work of Lamborghini chief designer Mitja Borkert and the company's Centro Stile department. The vehicle's technology was developed by Lamborghini's professional engineers and MIT's professors and students, and was unveiled at the EmTech conference in Cambridge, Massachusetts, United States. Lamborghini's chief technical officer, Maurizio Reggiani stated that the car is more of a "thinking box" than an actual production car. He also stressed that the car does not suggest that the company will be producing vehicles powered solely by electricity.

The Terzo Millennio was also used as a representative for the sports cars of the future.

== Vehicle information ==
=== Electric motor ===
The Terzo Millennio uses high-capacity supercapacitors in lieu of batteries, due to their more rapid storage and discharge of energy. These supercapacitors have been made to simultaneously capture and release energy to give the car an increase in performance, without having to depend on chemical reactions. Each wheel contains an electric motor, so that the amount of torque can be controlled individually, making the car's stability similar to the standard of a modern Formula One car. Because there is a motor on every wheel, the car's layout would be all-wheel drive if it was functional.

=== Autonomous capabilities ===
The Terzo Millennio is reported to have an autonomous system, but only for racetrack driving. This system would make the car run a full lap without any mistakes, then teach the driver how to run the lap on their own, using a ghost car, which is based on video game series such as Forza and Gran Turismo.

=== Design and body ===
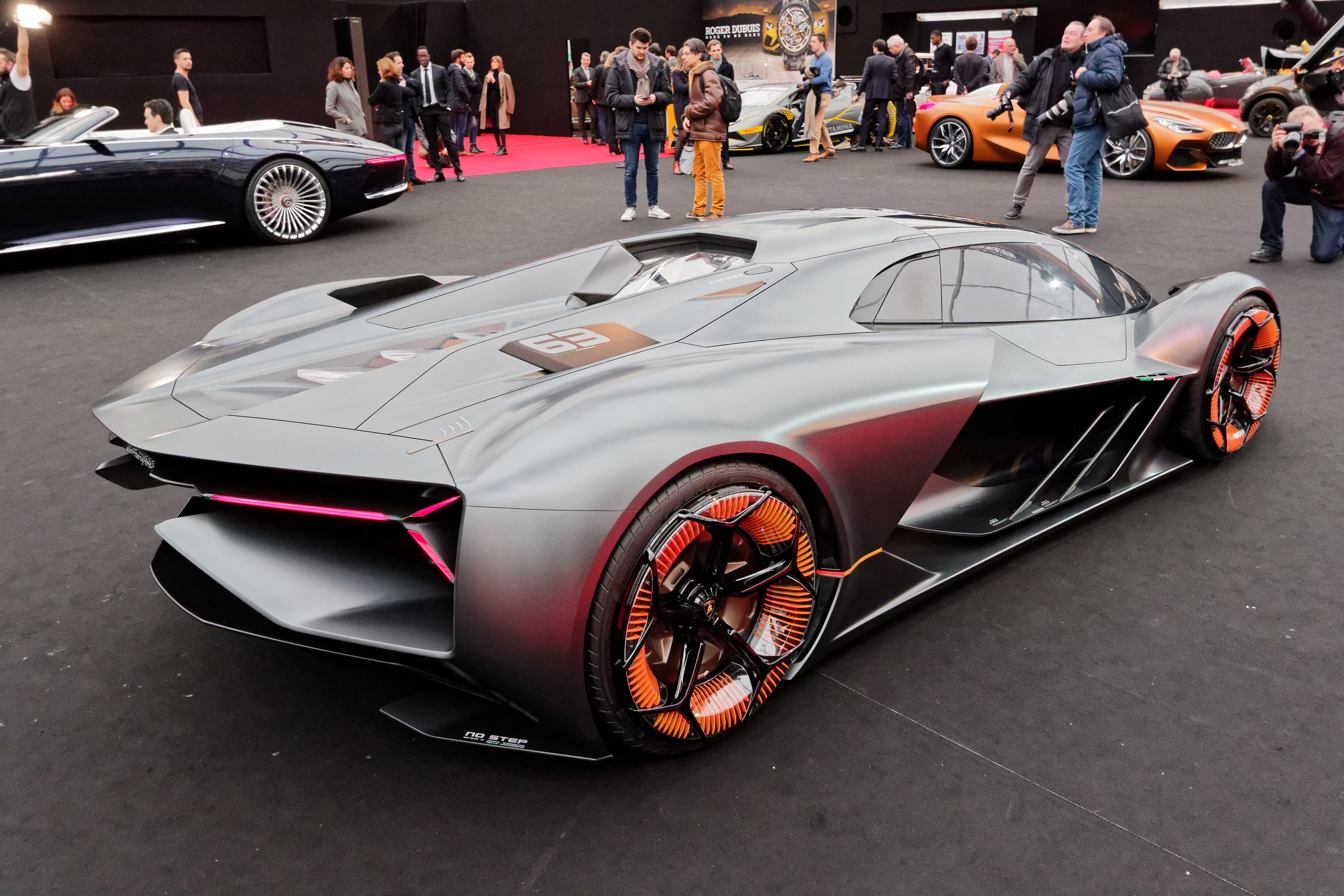
Rear view

The Terzo Millennio inherits the modern Lamborghini design language, with the Y-shaped design elements such as the headlights and taillights, along with the triangular front trunk and rear engine bay. The rims have an orange glow.

Carbon fiber is used entirely for the body panels. The body of the car is monitored by a health system. Entry by passengers is via a sliding canopy. The Terzo Millennio has a height of 1143 mm (45 inches).

== See also ==
- Museo Lamborghini
- List of Lamborghini concept vehicles
