= Lamborghini Lambo V12 Vision Gran Turismo =

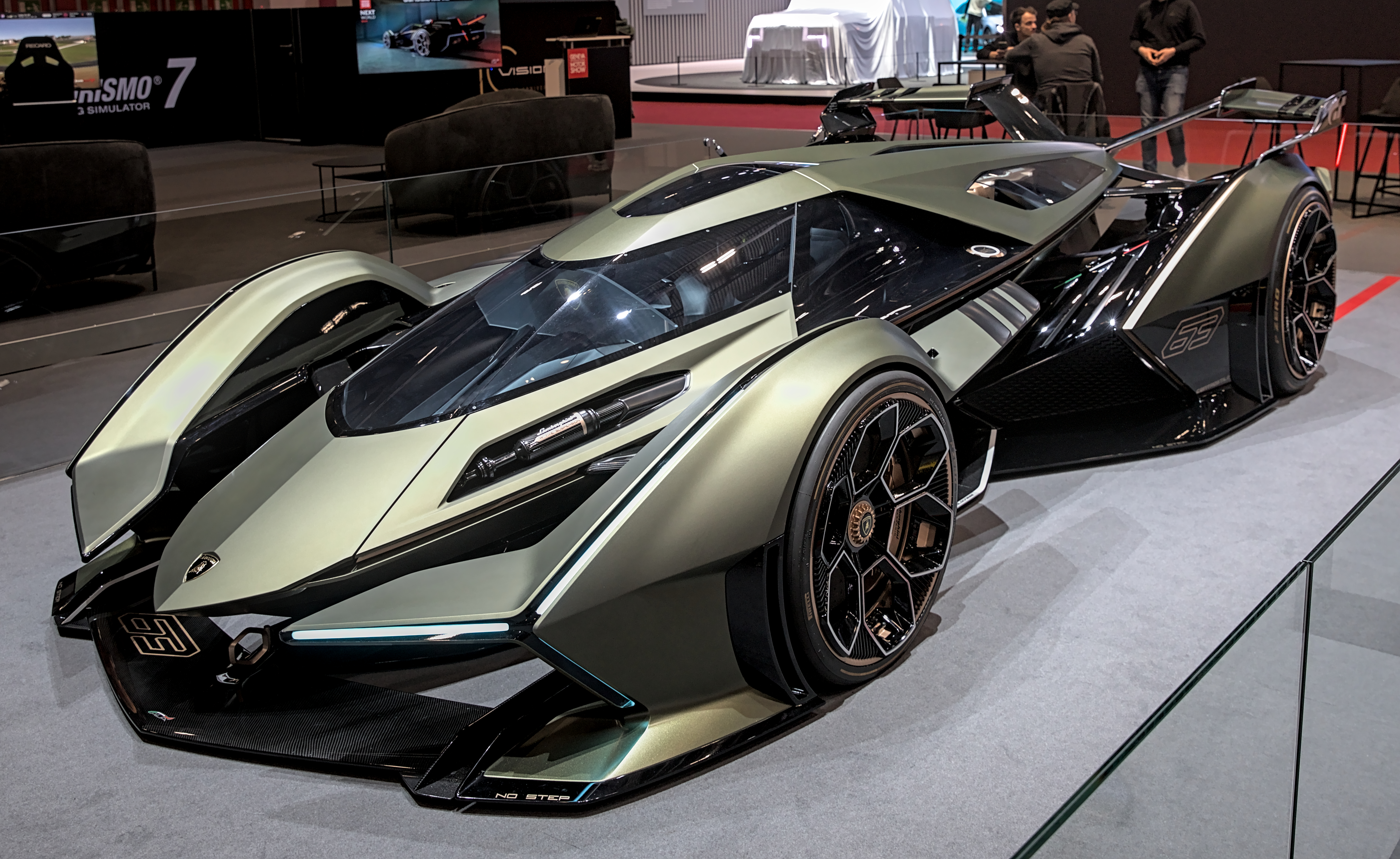

Overview
- Type: Concept car
- Manufacturer: Lamborghini
- Production: 2020
- Designer: Mitja Borkert

Body and chassis
- Body style: 2-door coupe
- Layout: Mid-engine, all-wheel drive

Powertrain
- Engine: 6.5 L L539 V12
- Electric motor: 48-volt e-motor to the gearbox
- Power output: Engine: 785 PS (577 kW; 774 hp); Electric motor: 34 PS (25 kW; 34 hp); Combined: 819 PS (602 kW; 808 hp)
- Transmission: 7-speed ISR automated manual

The Lamborghini Lambo V12 Vision Gran Turismo is a concept car developed by Lamborghini Centro Stile and presented in November 2019. Designed under the Vision Gran Turismo project, it embodies a futuristic vision of automotive performance and design.

== History ==
On 24 November 2019 (the day of the 2019 FIA GTC World Finals), Lamborghini revealed the "Lambo V12 Vision Gran Turismo"—a single-seat performance car, loosely resembling a sports prototype. Despite being unveiled when updates for Gran Turismo Sport were still active (with the last Sport update as of November 2021 being 1.66 in July 2021, which added the second-generation Toyota GR86), the car was only first seen in action in the Gran Turismo 7 release date trailer.

Lego released an official model of the Lambo V12 Vision Gran Turismo in May 2024.

== Design ==
Lamborghini designed this concept to captivate a young audience, especially fans of video games and virtual racing cars. Stefano Domenicali, then CEO of Lamborghini, said that this project reflects the brand's commitment to new generations and technological innovation. The central line and hexagonal side windows recall the Lamborghini Marzal of 1968, while the "Y"-shaped light signatures at the front and rear reinterpret an iconic element of the brand.

== Specifications ==
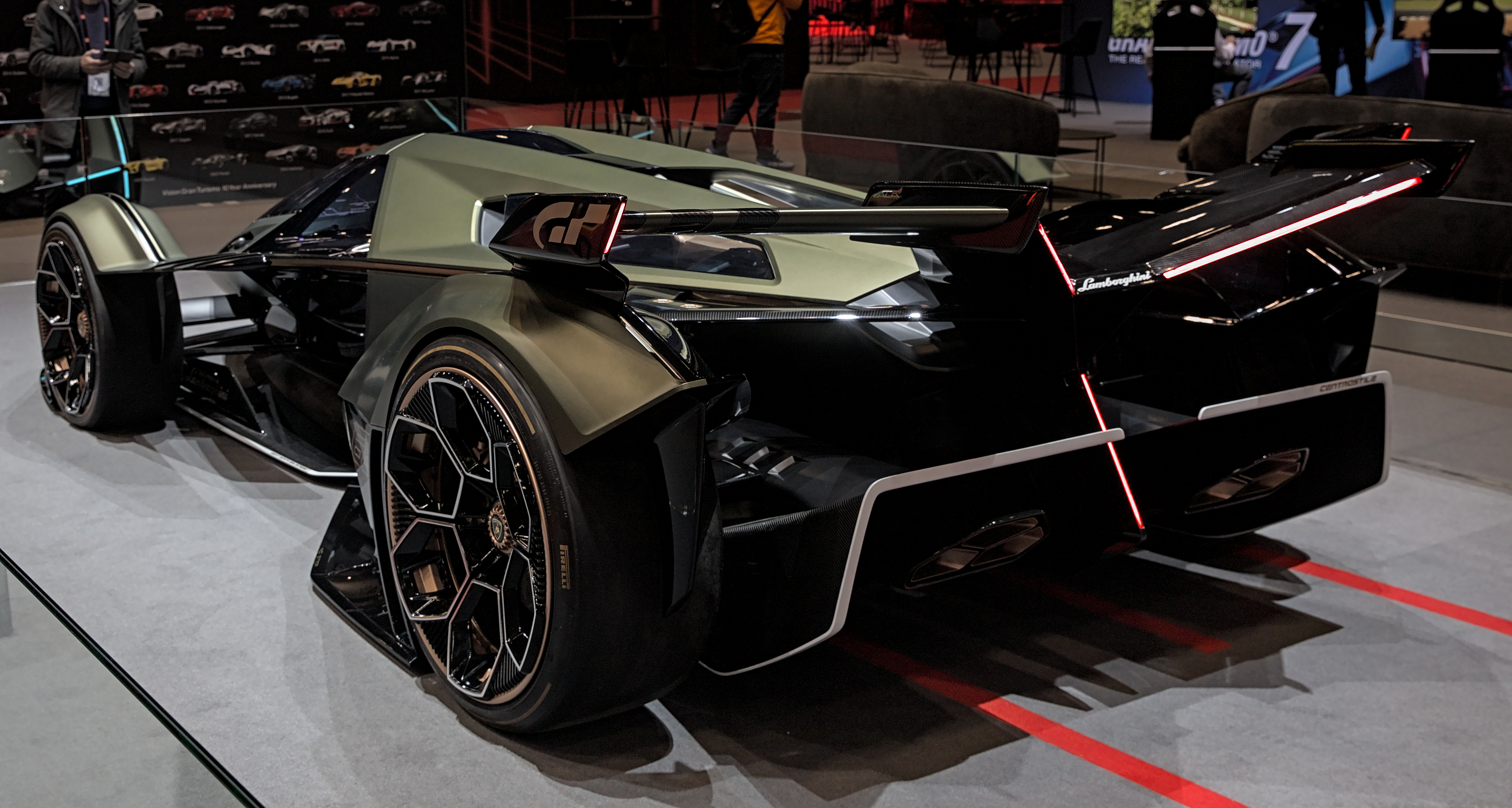
Rear view

The Lambo V12 Vision Gran Turismo is equipped with the same hybrid powertrain as the Lamborghini Sián FKP 37. It combines a 6.5-liter V12 engine with mild hybrid technology based on a supercapacitor, producing up to 819 PS (602 kW; 808 hp).

== See also ==
- Vision Gran Turismo
