= Mitja Borkert =

German automobile designer

- Born: 17 March 1974 (age 51); East Germany
- Engineering career
- Discipline: Automotive design

Mitja Borkert (born 17 March 1974) is a German automobile designer and chief engineer. He has served as director of Lamborghini Centro Stile since 2016. He was also a designer at Porsche from 1999 to 2016.

== Biography ==
Borkert was born in 1974 in Herzberg (Elster) in what was then East Germany, and after the fall of the Berlin Wall, he began attending the design department of Pforzheim University of Applied Sciences and graduated with a degree in transportation design.

== Career ==
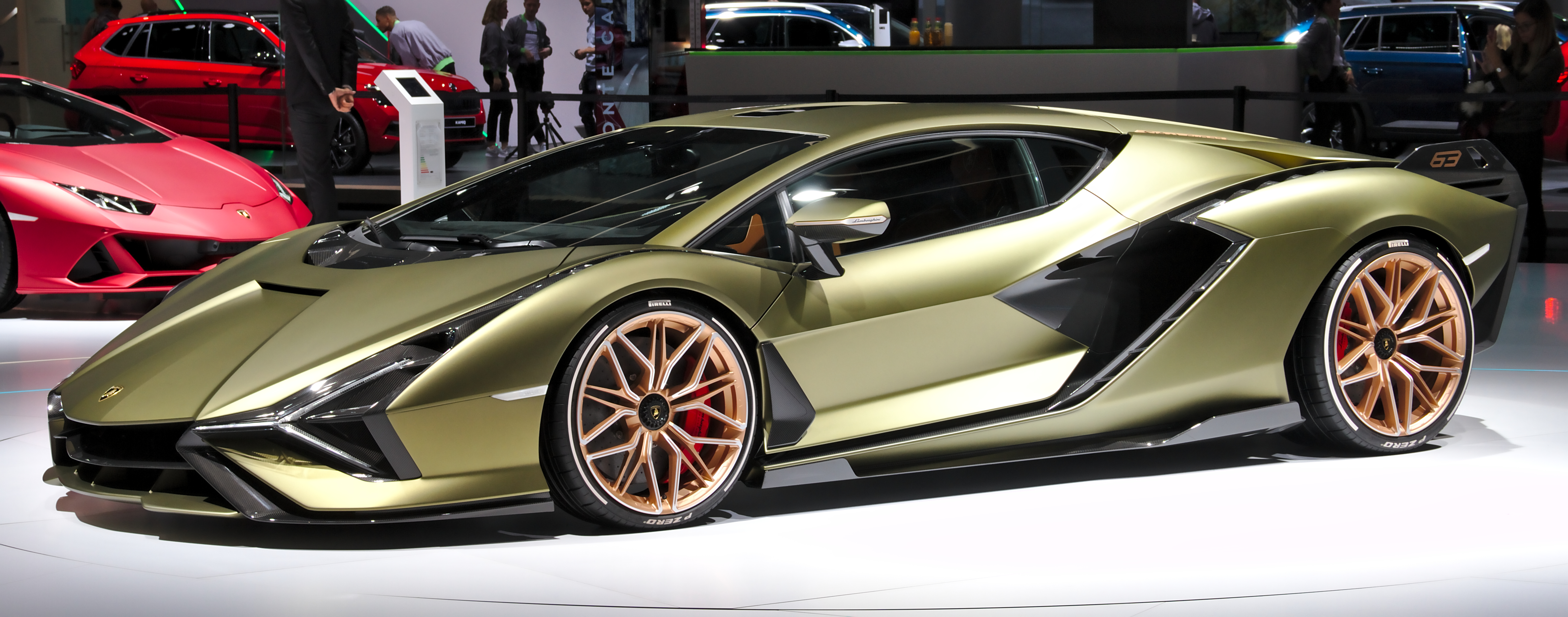
Lamborghini Sián

In 1999, Borkert was hired by Porsche at its style center in Weissach, where he had held various positions, the main of which have been that of General Manager of Advanced Design and in 2014, Director of Exterior Design. Here, he designed the Panamera Sport Turismo and the Porsche Boxster 987, collaborating in the creation of the second generation Cayenne, the Macan and the Mission E. After 17 years in Porsche, he left the German company in April 2016 to take on the role of Center Director Style of Lamborghini, replacing Filippo Perini who moved to direct Italdesign.

At Lamborghini, Borkert deals with the construction of the Aventador S and some special versions of the Huracán such as the Perfomante. In 2017, in collaboration with the Massachusetts Institute of Technology in the US, he designed the Terzo Millennio concept car.
