= Emtech =

The EmTech Artificial Intelligence Conference (short for "Emerging Technologies,” previously named EmTech Conference), produced by the Massachusetts Institute of Technology's Technology Review magazine, is an annual conference highlighting invention and new developments in engineering and technology. Started in 1999, the 2011 conference occurred on October 18–19 at MIT. Emtech is also organised in different regions such as in Europe, MENA, Latin America, Asia Pacific, China and India.

In addition to two days of presentations, the conference highlighted the winners of the annual TR35 award, recognizing the world's top 35 innovators under the age of 35. Some of the most famous winners of the award include Larry Page and Sergey Brin (creators of Google), Mark Zuckerberg (creator of Facebook), Jack Dorsey (creator of Twitter), and Konstantin Novoselov, who later won the Nobel Prize in Physics.
