= Porsche Vision Gran Turismo =

- The Porsche Vision Gran Turismo on display at the Porsche Museum in Stuttgart

Overview
- Type: Concept car
- Manufacturer: Porsche
- Production: 2022
- Designer: Peter Varga

Body and chassis
- Body style: 2-door coupe 2-door convertible (Spyder)
- Layout: Dual-motor, four-wheel-drive

The Porsche Vision Gran Turismo is a concept car developed by German automobile manufacturer Porsche.

The VGT is the first concept study by Porsche that was developed specifically for use in a computer game. It is intended to show future-oriented versions of well-known Porsche design elements and to create associations with both the 911 and the Taycan through the low-set front hood, the pronounced fenders and the narrow light strip at the rear. Porsche is breaking new ground in the interior by only using vegan materials in the concept vehicle. It is also the first (and currently only) Vision Gran Turismo vehicle to feature on the cover art of a Gran Turismo game, as it is seen on the cover of Gran Turismo 7 alongside the Mazda RX-Vision GT3 Concept.

== History ==
Porsche unveiled a separate concept, the 2019 Porsche 920 Vision, which was designed with the Vision Gran Turismo series in mind before a different design was decided upon. The true Porsche VGT was unveiled on 5 December 2021. Although the vehicle was developed exclusively for the video game Gran Turismo 7, Porsche built a rolling model without an engine, as the Vision Gran Turismo in the game has a purely electric drive. This all-white model was presented to the public on 24 August 2022 at Gamescom in Cologne and was painted live by the Belgian artist VEXX, in his typical street art style. The vehicle was then placed in the Porsche Museum.

== Specifications ==
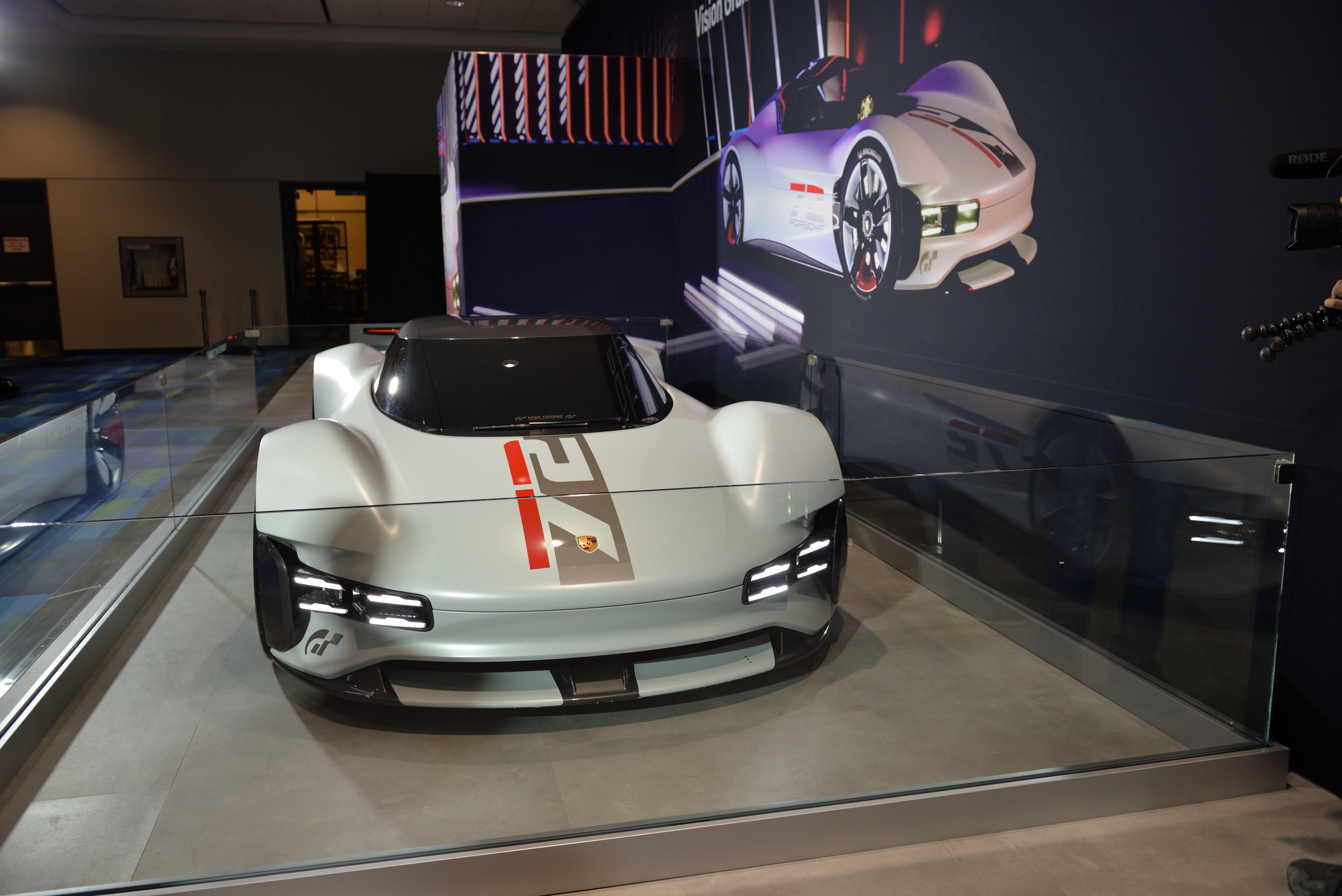
The Porsche Vision Gran Turismo on display in 2024

The VGT it is an electric two-seat sports car with mid-engined proportions and design cues from the brand's previous models, such as front quad-LED headlights, a rear light bar, and aggressively flared fenders.

820 kW (1115 hp) are available virtually, and with the overboost function even 950 kW (1292 hp). This enables the VGT to reach 100 km/h (62 mph) in 2.1 seconds and 200 km/h (120 mph) in 5.4 seconds. The vehicle top speed can be reached at 350 km/h (220 mph), and the 87 kWh (310 MJ) battery should be enough for 500 km (310 mi).

== Vision Gran Turismo Spyder ==
A Spyder version of the car was first teased on 21 September 2022 and released with Update 1.23 on 29 September 2022.

== See also ==
- Vision Gran Turismo
