= Nissan Concept 2020 Vision Gran Turismo =

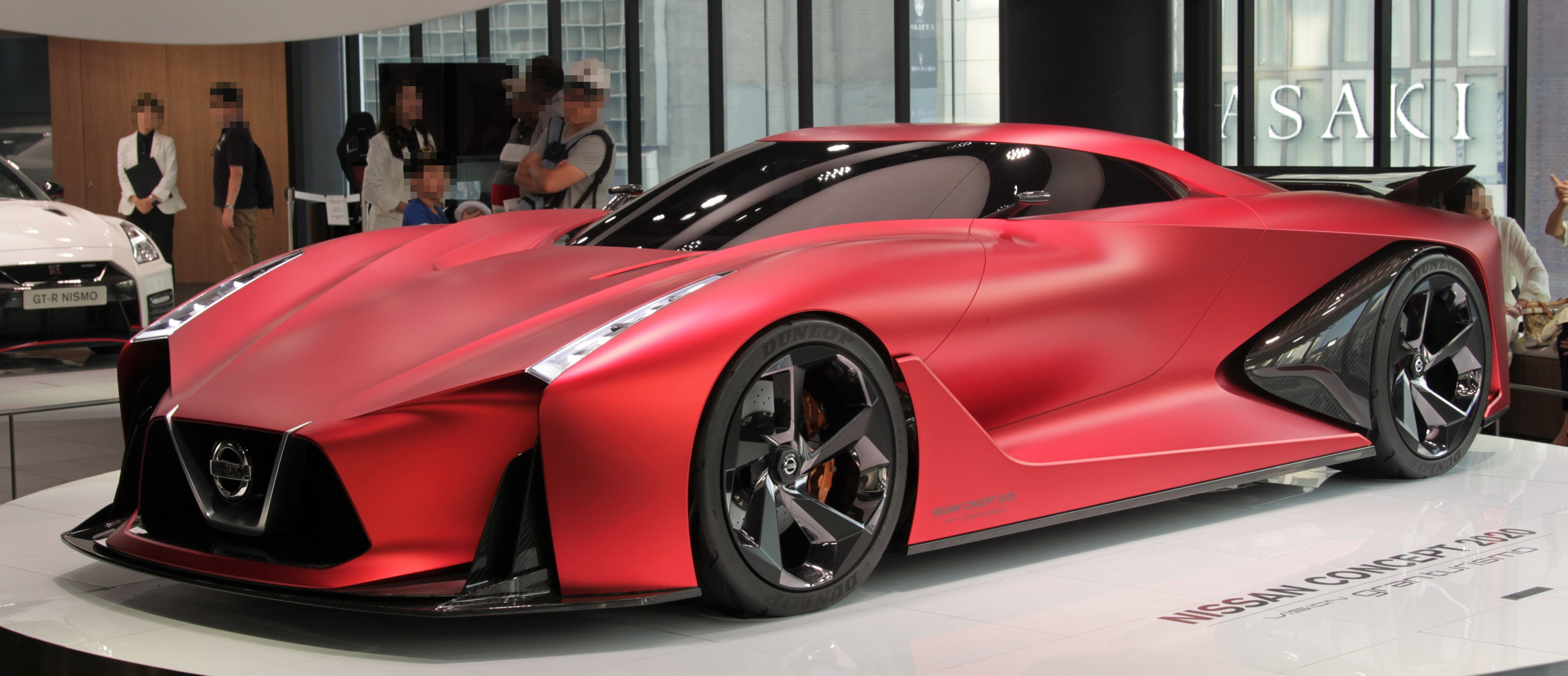

Overview
- Type: Concept car
- Manufacturer: Nissan
- Production: 2014
- Designer: Michael Rienth

Body and chassis
- Body style: 2-door coupe

The Nissan Concept 2020 Vision Gran Turismo is a concept car developed by Japanese car manufacturer Nissan for the video game Gran Turismo 6. Presented in 2014, this vehicle embodies the brand's futuristic vision in terms of design and performance.

== History ==
The project began as an initiative by young designers from the London-based Nissan Design Europe studio, who were given carte blanche to imagine the ideal supercar for their virtual garage in Gran Turismo. The concept then caught the attention of engineers at the Nissan Technical Center in Japan, who subjected the design to simulation and evaluation techniques. A full-scale model of the concept was unveiled at the Goodwood Festival of Speed in 2014, giving the public a first tangible glimpse of this futuristic vehicle. A full-scale replica in a special "Fire Knight" paint colour was displayed at the 44th Tokyo Motor Show in 2015.

== Specifications ==
The design of the Concept 2020 Vision Gran Turismo is distinguished by sharp lines and advanced aerodynamics, reflecting a potential evolution of the design of future GT-Rs. The vehicle features a 2+2 configuration, with a twin-turbo V6 engine and an all-wheel drive system, iconic features of Nissan's sports models.

== See also ==
- Vision Gran Turismo
