= Jaguar Vision Gran Turismo =

Electric concept sports car

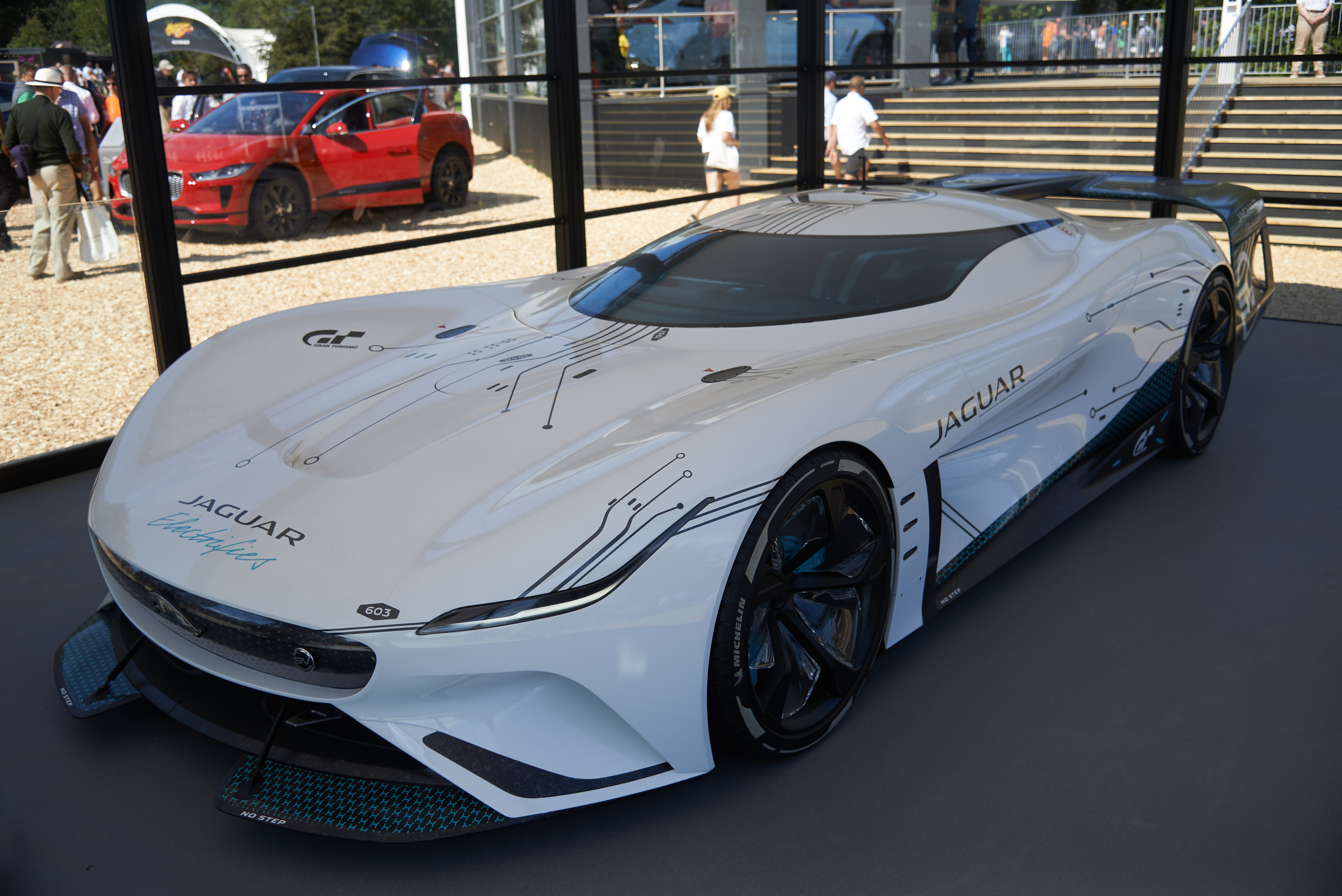
- Jaguar Vision Gran Turismo SV at the 2021 Goodwood Festival of Speed

Overview
- Manufacturer: Jaguar Cars
- Production: 2019 (concept car)
- Designer: Julian Thomson

Body and chassis
- Class: Sports car
- Layout: Four-wheel-drive

Powertrain
- Engine: Three electric motors, 1,004 PS (990 hp; 738 kW); Four electric motors, 1,900 PS (1,874 hp; 1,397 kW) (SV)
- Transmission: Single-speed transmission

Dimensions
- Wheelbase: 2,721 mm (107.1 in)
- Length: 4,679 mm (184.2 in); 5,540 mm (218.1 in) (SV)
- Width: 2,218 mm (87.3 in)
- Height: 1,081 mm (42.6 in)
- Curb weight: 3,100 lb (1,406 kg)

The Jaguar Vision Gran Turismo is a concept car designed, developed, and built by British manufacturer Jaguar. Built as part of the Vision Gran Turismo programme, the VGT embodies Jaguar's vision for an all-electric future, while drawing inspiration from the brand's historic motorsport successes. In Gran Turismo, it is offered in three versions, Coupé, SV and Roadster.

== History ==
Jaguar officially unveiled the first version of the VGT, the Vision Gran Turismo Coupé on 25 October 2019. The car takes the form of a grand touring coupé and is powered by three electric motors, which produce a total power output of 750 kW (1,010 hp). It was added to Gran Turismo Sport on 28 November 2019.

Gran Turismo 7 added the Vision Gran Turismo Roadster open top variant, as well as the Vision Gran Turismo SV, a racing variant of the Vision Gran Turismo Coupé unveiled in December 2020.

== Specifications ==
The Jaguar Vision Gran Turismo is based on an advanced electric architecture, showcasing the brand's technical capabilities in the field of electric propulsion. The concept car is equipped with three electric motors, one for the front axle and two for the rear axle, delivering a combined output of 1,020 horsepower (750 kW). It accelerates from 0 to 100 km/h in less than 2 seconds and its top speed exceeds 320 km/h (200 mph). The onboard battery is based on advanced technologies, enabling optimal energy distribution for consistent performance and enhanced handling. It also features movable aerodynamic elements optimize downforce and stability according to driving conditions.

== Jaguar Vision Gran Turismo SV ==
In 2021, an upgraded version of the concept, the Jaguar Vision Gran Turismo SV, was unveiled. Designed as a virtual endurance racing car, it incorporates aerodynamic improvements and increased power, while retaining the basic characteristics of the original model. It also has a large fixed wing and four motors instead of three for a total power output of 1,400 kW (1,877 hp).
