= Gran Turismo 7 =

2022 sim racing video game

- Digital cover art featuring the 2022 Porsche Vision Gran Turismo (top) and the 2020 Mazda RX-Vision GT3 Concept (bottom)
- Developer: Polyphony Digital
- Publisher: Sony Interactive Entertainment
- Director: Kazunori Yamauchi
- Programmers: Shuichi Takano; Takahito Tejima; Riso Suzuki
- Composers: Masahiro Andoh; Daiki Kasho
- Series: Gran Turismo
- Platforms: PlayStation 4; PlayStation 5
- Release: March 4, 2022
- Genre: Sim racing
- Modes: Single-player, multiplayer

Gran Turismo 7 (Note: Japanese: グランツーリスモ7, Hepburn: Guran Tsūrisumo 7) is a 2022 sim racing video game developed by Polyphony Digital and published by Sony Interactive Entertainment. It is the eighth main installment and the thirteenth overall in the Gran Turismo series, following Gran Turismo Sport (2017). The game was released for the PlayStation 4 and PlayStation 5. Gran Turismo 7 features virtual reality (VR) support with PlayStation VR2 through a free in-game update.

Gran Turismo 7 received generally positive reviews from critics, with praise for its graphics and gameplay. However, player reception was more negative at the initial release, with criticism of its use of microtransactions and focus on grinding. The game was subject to intense review bombing on Metacritic, receiving the lowest Metascore for a Sony-published title.

On March 25, 2022, Kazunori Yamauchi issued an update via the official PlayStation Blog, apologizing for the recent controversy and outlining a compensation plan. Players who owned the game prior to the announcement could receive a gift of 1 million in-game credits (Cr.). Additionally, a major update is scheduled for early April, which will increase the number of events and overhaul the reward system to create a more balanced gameplay experience. As of 2026, the game has sold 12.7 million copies.

== Gameplay ==
Gran Turismo 7 features the return of the single player campaign, GT Simulation Mode. Other returning features are the return of traditional racing tracks and vehicles, Special Events, Championships, Driving School, Tuning Parts Shop, Used Cars dealership, and GT Auto while still retaining the new GT Sport Mode, Brand Central, and Discover (now labelled Showcase) that were introduced in Gran Turismo Sport. The player needs to progress through tasks ("Menu Books") from the GT Café to unlock features like multiplayer, and all tracks and cars.

The game features the return of dynamic time and weather effects, which previously appeared in Gran Turismo 5 and Gran Turismo 6. Despite the game including a single player campaign, like with Gran Turismo Sport, the game requires a constant internet connection and a PlayStation Network account in order for players to be able to save their progress. The series creator Kazunori Yamauchi explains that this decision was made to prevent cheating. Arcade mode is fully playable offline.

For the PlayStation 5 version, the game takes advantage of the console's increased processing power, dedicated ray-tracing hardware, custom solid-state drive storage, Tempest Engine, and DualSense controller to support features such as advanced haptic technology feedback, adaptive triggers, real-time ray tracing effects, 3D spatial audio, and reduced loading times. The PlayStation 5 version of Gran Turismo 7 also runs at 4K resolution and 60 frames per second with support for high dynamic range, a significant improvement to performance on original PlayStation 4 consoles which run in 1080p. In addition, drivers from Gran Turismo's esports competition, the Gran Turismo World Series (previously the FIA-Certified Gran Turismo Championships utilizing Gran Turismo Sport), appear as AI opponents and License Test coaches.

As of the current version of the game, 1.72, Gran Turismo 7 features 580 cars and 42 track environments with 122 layouts.

== Development ==
In a July 2019 interview with GTPlanet, a fan website dedicated to the Gran Turismo series, Yamauchi stated that the next Gran Turismo title is in active development. Yamauchi confirmed that there would be a focus on fine tuning the classic GT experience, and added: "I think the next title that we're going to create will be a combination of the past, present and future – a complete form of Gran Turismo."

Gran Turismo 7 was revealed at Sony's PlayStation 5 (PS5) reveal stream on June 11, 2020. Like the previous installments, the game was developed by Polyphony Digital and published by Sony Interactive Entertainment for the PlayStation 4 (PS4) and PlayStation 5 (PS5). tri-Crescendo contributed to development by assisting with background models. The game was initially scheduled for a release in 2021. It was later delayed to 2022 due to the impact of the COVID-19 pandemic on the video game industry affecting game development. The game was released for PS4 and PS5 consoles on March 4, 2022.

Seven-time Formula One world driver's champion Lewis Hamilton reprised his role as the Maestro of the series from Gran Turismo Sport. On the day of the game's release, Gran Turismo 7 was removed from sale in Russia, although Sony had not made a formal decision at the time. On March 9, four days after its release, PlayStation announced that it would halt sales of its games, including Gran Turismo 7, in Russia in response to the Russian invasion of Ukraine.

Polyphony Digital's sound design team experimented with over 50 microphone types to capture the best car audio. They recorded cars on hub dynamometers at locations in Japan, Europe, and North America. Additional recording took place with the cars driving on closed courses. Microphones were placed at the intake, engine, exhaust, and cabin of each vehicle. Tire noise on various surfaces was also captured. In-game audio playback utilizes ambisonics for realistic 3D audio.

On March 7, Columbia Records and Sony Interactive Entertainment released a soundtrack album titled Find Your Line (Official Music from Gran Turismo 7). The album features songs inspired by the game recorded by a lineup of artists, including GoldLink, Bring Me the Horizon, Nothing but Thieves, Idris Elba, Major Lazer, Rosalía, Lil Tjay, and Jawsh 685. In June, the FIA announced it had chosen Assetto Corsa Competizione as its platform for the 2022 Motorsport Games after mutually agreeing with Polyphony to temporarily suspend their partnership until the game's platform becomes more stable.

=== Post-release ===
Polyphony Digital supports Gran Turismo 7 with patches that add new features and implement bug fixes. One of the first changes revolved around rebalancing the game's economy. The 1.29 update was released on February 20, 2023, which included the PS VR2 upgrade, and time-limited events that will offer a glimpse of the new AI Sophy. The new AI would adapt to the level of the player and make use of advanced techniques like drafting.

==== Spec updates ====
On November 2, 2023, the update 1.40, advertised as Spec II, was released, which included four player local split screen mode, and Lake Louise, the first snow-based circuit in the history of the game. Since then, towards the late year, Polyphony released big updates advertised as Spec.

On June 25, 2025, the Gran Turismo series reached 100 million sold units. In celebration, Polyphony released the update 1.65, labeled as Spec III, later in that year, on December 4. The update added Circuit Gilles Villeneuve and Yas Marina Circuit as new circuits; eight new cars, including Ferrari 296 GT3, and a Power Pack, sold exclusively for the PlayStation 5 version. The Power Pack, priced at $29.99, includes a 5-million credit bonus and 50 new races, featuring the AI Sophy at version 3.0, including more realistic battles.

On September 3, 2026, during a PlayStation State of Play, Kazunori Yamauchi announced the Spec IV update, which would come separately as two updates: 1.72, in October, and 1.73, in December. Spec IV is confirmed to add two new circuits: Sportsland Sugo, in 1.72, and Autumn Ring, in 1.73; twelve new cars, including (but not confirmed) Citroën 2CV, Honda Stepwgn and BMW M5, and a family mode.

=== Partnerships with real-life racing events ===
Gran Turismo 7 continues the series' partnerships with the Super Formula Championship and the Federation Internationale de l'Automobile (FIA), the latter for the World Endurance Championship, sim racing, and officially-sanctioned esports championships. The 1.32 update, released on April 27, 2023, continued the series' partnership with the Super Formula Championship, adding the Dallara SF23 shortly after its debut in the 2023 Super Formula Championship; on launch, the game featured the Dallara SF19, a vehicle that had featured previously in the previous title, Gran Turismo Sport. Ahead of the 2026 24 Hours of Le Mans, and to accompany the existing Toyota GR010 Hybrid, Polyphony added four hypercars and a Porsche safety car with a Gran Turismo livery.

== My First Gran Turismo ==
On 6 December 2024, the free-to-play My First Gran Turismo (Note: Known as Gran Turismo for Beginners (はじめてのグランツーリスモ, Hajimete no Guran Tsūrisumo) in Japan) was released for the PlayStation 4 and PlayStation 5. The game is effectively a demo version of Gran Turismo 7 and features 18 cars and three tracks. The cars can be imported into the main game after unlocking them all. The PlayStation 5 version of the game includes support for PlayStation VR2.

== Reception ==
Reception

Aggregate scores
Aggregator	Score
Metacritic	PS4: 82/100; PS5: 87/100
OpenCritic	92% recommend

Review scores
Publication	Score
Destructoid	8.5/10
Easy Allies	8.5/10
Famitsu	38/40
Game Informer	8.75/10
GameRevolution	8.5/10
GameSpot	8/10
GamesRadar+	4.5/5
Hardcore Gamer	5/5
IGN	9/10
Push Square	9/10
Shacknews	9/10
The Guardian	4/5
VentureBeat	4.5/5
Video Games Chronicle	3/5
VG247	5/5
VideoGamer.com	10/10

=== Critical response ===
Gran Turismo 7 received "generally favorable" reviews from critics, according to review aggregator website Metacritic. Hands-on of the Gran Turismo 7 VR support on the PS VR2 was overwhelmingly positive, with one editor describing it as "the best console virtual reality experience to date."

While disliking the monetization, Ars Technica praised the implementation of license tests, and said that "Polyphony has struck a good balance here. The threshold for achieving a bronze finish in each test is relatively easy to reach, but getting all golds might be a time-consuming and frustrating experience, depending on your skill."

The Verge liked the title's DualSense features, writing "it's the best showcase for the DualSense I've yet to see. The vibrations in the controller do a convincing job of simulating various surfaces, conditions, and degrees of traction... You can even feel the pressure release in anti-lock brake systems." Eurogamer enjoyed the GT Cafe, singling out the characters as a memorable part of it, and commented: "Of all the many twists and turns... the visual novel might well be the most surprising yet. What's perhaps more surprising is Gran Turismo 7 lands it remarkably well, giving its campaign an oddball character all of its own."

Polygon felt the visuals were "cutting edge" but criticized how long it took to unlock cars, and stated: "The rate at which you earn credits feels slow, with many desirable cars remaining out of reach long into the game... Just keeping up with the entry requirements of events can necessitate going off-piste to grind for credits." Destructoid liked the amount of ways that were available to tackle courses, feeling it added more variety to the game, and said: "You can do a classic reverse racing situation, as well as dabble in parts of the track... take on time trials, free play lobbies (where you can just drive around and chill), arcade mode, and events."

Game Informer praised the feel of driving, especially the handling of terrain, "elevation changes, weather, driving surface, road bank, vehicle downforce, and countless other factors seamlessly contribute to whether you successfully carry your momentum into a turn or spin out into the grass." GamesRadar+ enjoyed the amount of content available, calling it "an absolutely gargantuan game," but criticized the performance, noting hitches and occasional crashes. IGN felt Gran Turismo 7 recreated the spirit of prior entries but felt the car selection was limited relative to competitors like Forza, and commented: "With a few exceptions, most manufacturers' ranges tend to top out at around 2017. If you're expecting to see quite a few high-profile cars from the last two or three years here, like the latest McLarens or any Tesla built since 2012, you may be disappointed."

=== Audience response ===
Gran Turismo 7 was the subject of review bombing on Metacritic two weeks after release, following changes made to the game through patches. It received the lowest Metacritic user rating for a game published by Sony. Criticism focused on its aggressive use of microtransactions and the focus on grinding to unlock in-game currency and content. Players mentioned that updates to the game increased the time needed to grind, as well as reducing the amount of rewards gained, feeling it encouraged spending real-world money on microtransactions. The pricing of items was labelled by some as being too expensive, as certain cars could cost as much as US$200. The game's 1.07 version update led to a downtime that lasted 30 hours as a result of server maintenance; the always-online DRM requirement meant players were limited to the game's offline modes.

During the first month of release, Polyphony president Kazunori Yamauchi wrote that while he wished for players to enjoy content without microtransactions, he felt it important that cars reflected the prices of their real-world counterparts to "convey their value and rarity." His statement drew some criticism. Several days later, Yamauchi apologized for the outage and the changes made to the in-game economy, and announced Polyphony would implement a series of updates from April 2022 to make progression fairer. As compensation, all players who had bought the game before March 25 would receive one million credits—the equivalent of US$10—of in-game currency, available until the following month.

=== Sales ===
In Japan, it launched with 139,964 physical units sold in its first week, making it the best-selling game of the week. It sold over 190,000 physical units in Japan during its launch month, making it the second best-selling game of the month in the country (below Kirby and the Forgotten Land). By March 26, 2023, 300,682 units of the game had been sold in Japan.

In the United States, it set a franchise record with the highest-grossing launch month sales for a Gran Turismo title, despite ranking number two in its debut month (second only to Elden Ring). It became the 13th best-selling game of 2022 in the US.

In the United Kingdom, Gran Turismo 7 was the best-selling game in its first week of release, and remained number one the following week. It reached number 1 in Switzerland. In Germany, over 200,000 units of the game had been sold by the end of March 2022. By the end of January 2023, over 400,000 units of the game had been sold in Germany.

=== Awards ===
Year	Award	Category	Recipient(s) and nominees	Result	Ref.
2022	Golden Joystick Awards	Ultimate Game of the Year	Gran Turismo 7	Nominated	
2022	Golden Joystick Awards	Best Audio	Gran Turismo 7	Nominated	
2022	Golden Joystick Awards	PlayStation Game of the Year	Gran Turismo 7	Nominated	
2022	Hollywood Music in Media Awards (HMMA)	Best Original Song	Vroom	Nominated	
2022	IGN Nordic	Best Racing Game	Gran Turismo 7	Won	
2022	The Game Awards 2022	Best Sports/Racing Game	Gran Turismo 7	Won	
2022	The Game Awards 2022	Best Audio Design	Gran Turismo 7	Nominated	
2022	IGN Awards	Best Racing Game	Gran Turismo 7	Won	
2022	GM GOTY Awards	Best Racing Game	Gran Turismo 7	Nominated	
2022	PS Blog Game of the Year	Best Sports Game	Gran Turismo 7	Won	
2022	Traxion.GG Awards	Best Racing Game	Gran Turismo 7	Won	
2022	PSU's Game Of The Year Awards	Best Racing Game	Gran Turismo 7	Runner-up	
2022	PSU's Game Of The Year Awards	Best Sound Design	Gran Turismo 7	Runner-up	
2023	Gameranx	Best Racing Game	Gran Turismo 7	Won	
2023	Operation Sports 2022 Awards	Best Racing Game	Gran Turismo 7	Nominated	
2023	Operation Sports 2022 Awards	Best Racing Game (community vote)	Gran Turismo 7	Won	
2023	Game Audio Network Guild Awards	Audio of the Year	Gran Turismo 7	Nominated	
2023	NAVGTR Awards	Outstanding Song Collection	Gran Turismo 7	Nominated	
2023	Guild of Music Supervisors Awards	Best Music Supervision for a Videogame (Synch)	Gran Turismo 7	Nominated	
2023	26th Annual D.I.C.E. Awards	Racing Game of the Year	Gran Turismo 7	Won	
2023	The Game Awards 2023	Best VR/AR Game	Gran Turismo 7	Nominated	
2024	PlayStation Music Awards	Creative Sound Award	Gran Turismo 7	Won	
2025	Algeria Game Awards	Best Sport/Racing Game	My First Gran Turismo	Nominated	
