= Vision Gran Turismo =

Series of concept cars developed for video games

The Vision Gran Turismo Program (commonly abbreviated Vision GT or VGT) is a series of virtual concept cars developed by various car manufacturers for the Gran Turismo series of sim racing games.

Debuting in Gran Turismo 6, Vision GT cars later made an appearance in each subsequent Gran Turismo installment (Gran Turismo Sport and Gran Turismo 7), all developed by Polyphony Digital. For the most part, they apply present-day technology and materials, with a handful of notable exceptions that utilize novel propulsion and aerodynamic technologies. Their appearances as free update content have been staggered since the launch of GT6 in 2013, with many becoming available for in-game acquisition upon release.

The cars have been met with critical acclaim for their novel approach to aesthetics and performance. Real-life full-size models have been shown at motor shows in Japan, Canada, Germany, England, the US and Switzerland.

== Background ==
The name "Vision Gran Turismo" was originally used for a Gran Turismo HD trailer in 2006. In 2013, to commemorate the Gran Turismo franchise's 15th anniversary, Polyphony Digital announced "Vision Gran Turismo", a special project featuring concept cars designed for the series by automakers and coachbuilders such as Alpine, Aston Martin, Audi, BMW, Honda, Infiniti, Italdesign Giugiaro, Mercedes-Benz, Nissan, Peugeot, SRT, Volkswagen, and Zagato. Each Vision GT car added to the series was marketed as a car players could own and drive in-game.

Some Vision GT projects have inspired the design of some production cars from their respective brands. Cars such as the Bugatti Chiron, McLaren Sabre, and McLaren Solus GT share similar design cues with their respective brand's Vision Gran Turismo cars. The Bugatti Vision Gran Turismo was itself a precursor to the Chiron, and the Solus GT was directly based on the McLaren Ultimate Vision Gran Turismo. While not explicitly confirmed by BMW, the first generation BMW M2 also shares its design cues from the BMW Vision Gran Turismo. Hyundai has cited the N 2025 Vision Gran Turismo as inspiration for the Hyundai N Vision 74.

== Gran Turismo 6 ==
=== Mercedes-Benz AMG Vision Gran Turismo ===
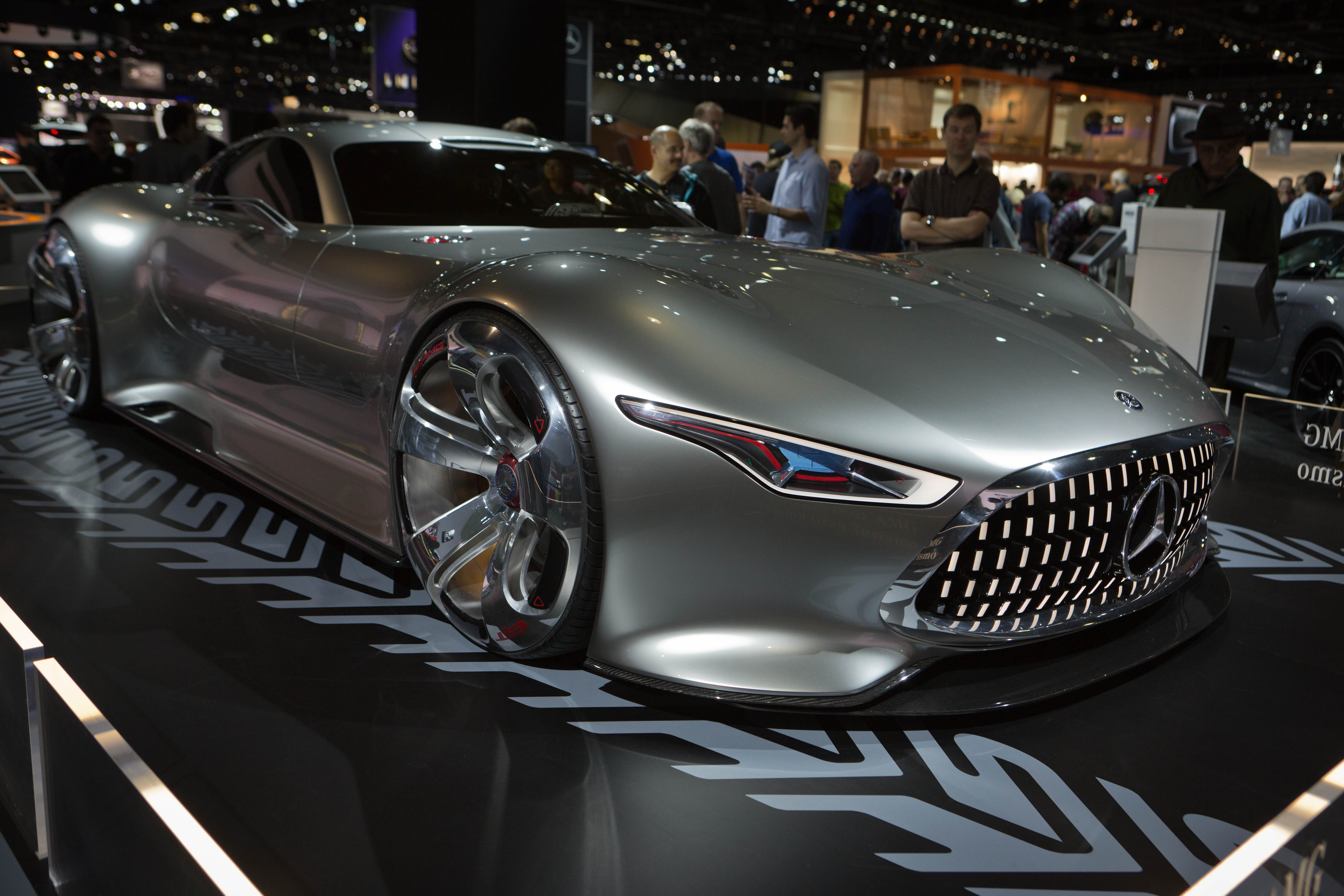
Mercedes-Benz AMG Vision Gran Turismo at the 2013 Los Angeles Auto Show

The first Vision Gran Turismo car was released on 20 November 2013 by Mercedes-Benz, simply named the Mercedes-Benz AMG Vision Gran Turismo. It takes the form of a long-hooded coupe (inspired by the 300 SL and akin to the SLS AMG) with no rear window and an active rear spoiler. Eight rectangular exhaust tips are located above and below the single horizontal taillight. The car is characterised as having an aluminum space frame and a twin-turbocharged 5.5-litre M157 V8 engine with an output of 430 kW (580 hp).

Another virtual Mercedes-Benz model was the first Vision Gran Turismo release for 2014. Based on the original model albeit with racing modifications, the car was named the "Mercedes-Benz AMG Vision Gran Turismo Racing Series", and was released on 28 January 2014 as the second official Vision Gran Turismo concept car. This variant of the AMG Vision GT received a power increase to 441 kW (591 hp) and a sequential transmission, among with some aesthetic upgrades and a weight reduction of 85 kg (187 lb).

=== BMW Vision Gran Turismo ===
BMW released their own project almost six months later, with the BMW Vision Gran Turismo (released on 14 May 2014 in update 1.07). This was a coupe modelled after BMW's touring cars from the 1970s, with plenty of aerodynamic elements and a 3-litre twin-turbo inline-six engine producing 404 kW (542 hp).

=== Mitsubishi Concept XR-PHEV Evolution Vision Gran Turismo ===
Mitsubishi Motors followed with the Mitsubishi Concept XR-PHEV Evolution Vision Gran Turismo (released on 30 May 2014 in update 1.08). Mitsubishi's entry was, as its name suggests, a plug-in hybrid with aggressive, rally-oriented widebody styling.

=== Volkswagen GTI Roadster Vision Gran Turismo ===
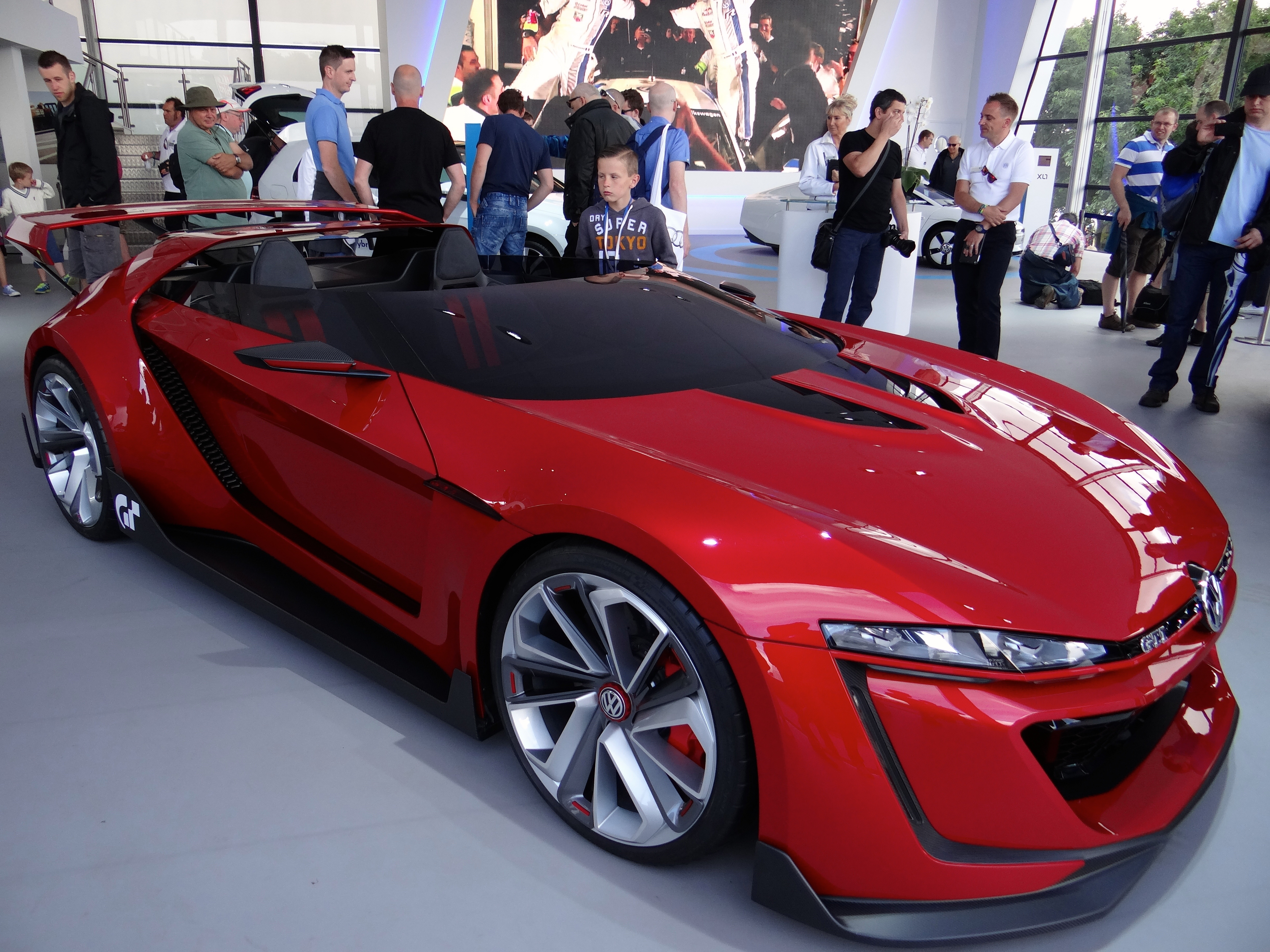
Volkswagen GTI Roadster Vision Gran Turismo at the 2014 Goodwood Festival of Speed

Volkswagen released the fifth Vision Gran Turismo concept car a month later, on 18 June 2014. Named the Volkswagen GTI Roadster Vision Gran Turismo, the low open-top car was then included in the 1.09 update. It is powered by a 3-litre twin-turbo VR6 engine producing 375 kW (503 hp).

=== Nissan Concept 2020 Vision Gran Turismo ===
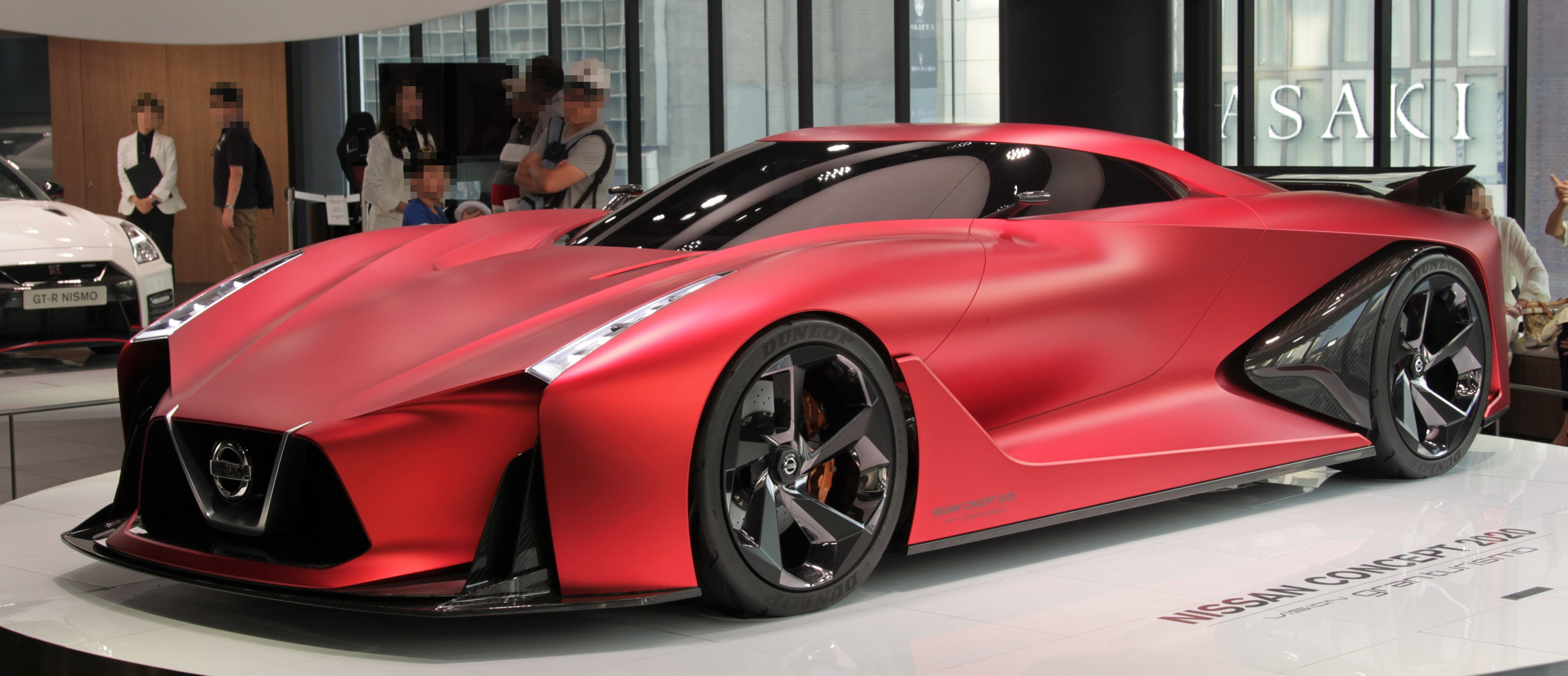
Nissan Concept 2020 Vision Gran Turismo

The next month, July, saw the unveiling of two Vision Gran Turismo cars from two separate brands that were both made available on the 25th.

The Nissan Concept 2020 Vision Gran Turismo was conceptualised by young designers in the UK before being fleshed out with the assistance of Nissan's engineers in Japan. It is the seventh car in the program. The result contains an emphasis on handling and aerodynamics; the car's fenders cut through the air while the undertray creates a passive vacuum, and an active rear spoiler transfers downforce loads directly to the rear axle. The Concept 2020 is powered by a hybrid system consisting of a V6 engine and three motors (two for each of the front wheels, and one for the rear axle). A full-scale replica in a special "Fire Knight" paint colour was displayed at the 44th Tokyo Motor Show in 2015.

=== Aston Martin DP100 Vision Gran Turismo ===
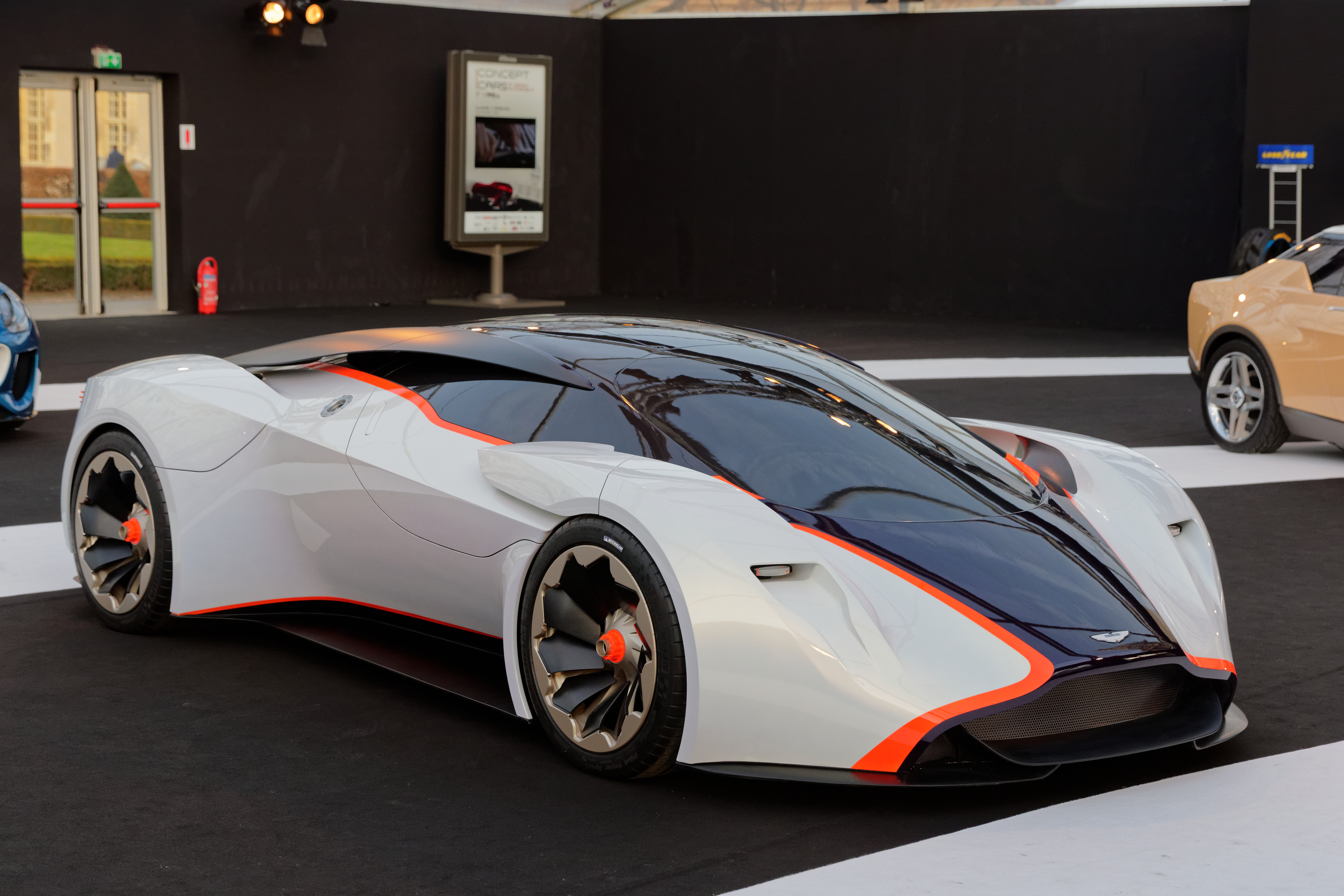
Aston Martin DP100 Vision Gran Turismo at the 2015 Festival Automobile International

Released alongside the Nissan Concept 2020, Aston Martin's Vision Gran Turismo car is called the Aston Martin DP100 Vision Gran Turismo, with "DP" being an acronym for "Design Prototype". It contains an 800 kW (1,100 hp) twin-turbo V12 engine, headlights nestled within NACA ducts on the front fenders, active wheel "blades" to aid in brake cooling, and "light blade" taillights later seen on the limited-production Vulcan.

=== Toyota FT-1 Vision Gran Turismo ===
The final four months of 2014 saw the release of five Vision Gran Turismo cars, with the Toyota FT-1 Vision Gran Turismo from Toyota (released on 16 September 2014, update 1.11) being the first. This was a virtual overhaul of Toyota's original FT-1 concept with Group GT3-style aerodynamics.

=== Subaru VIZIV GT Vision Gran Turismo ===
The FT-1 VGT was followed by the Subaru VIZIV GT Vision Gran Turismo from Subaru (released on 19 November 2014, update 1.14), which designer Tomoyuki Kato states was inspired by katsuobushi. This is evoked by the solid, chiseled appearance of the VIZIV GT. It combines Subaru's signature flat-four engine and all-wheel drive layout with electric motors and a torque vectoring system.

=== Chevrolet-Chaparral 2X Vision Gran Turismo ===
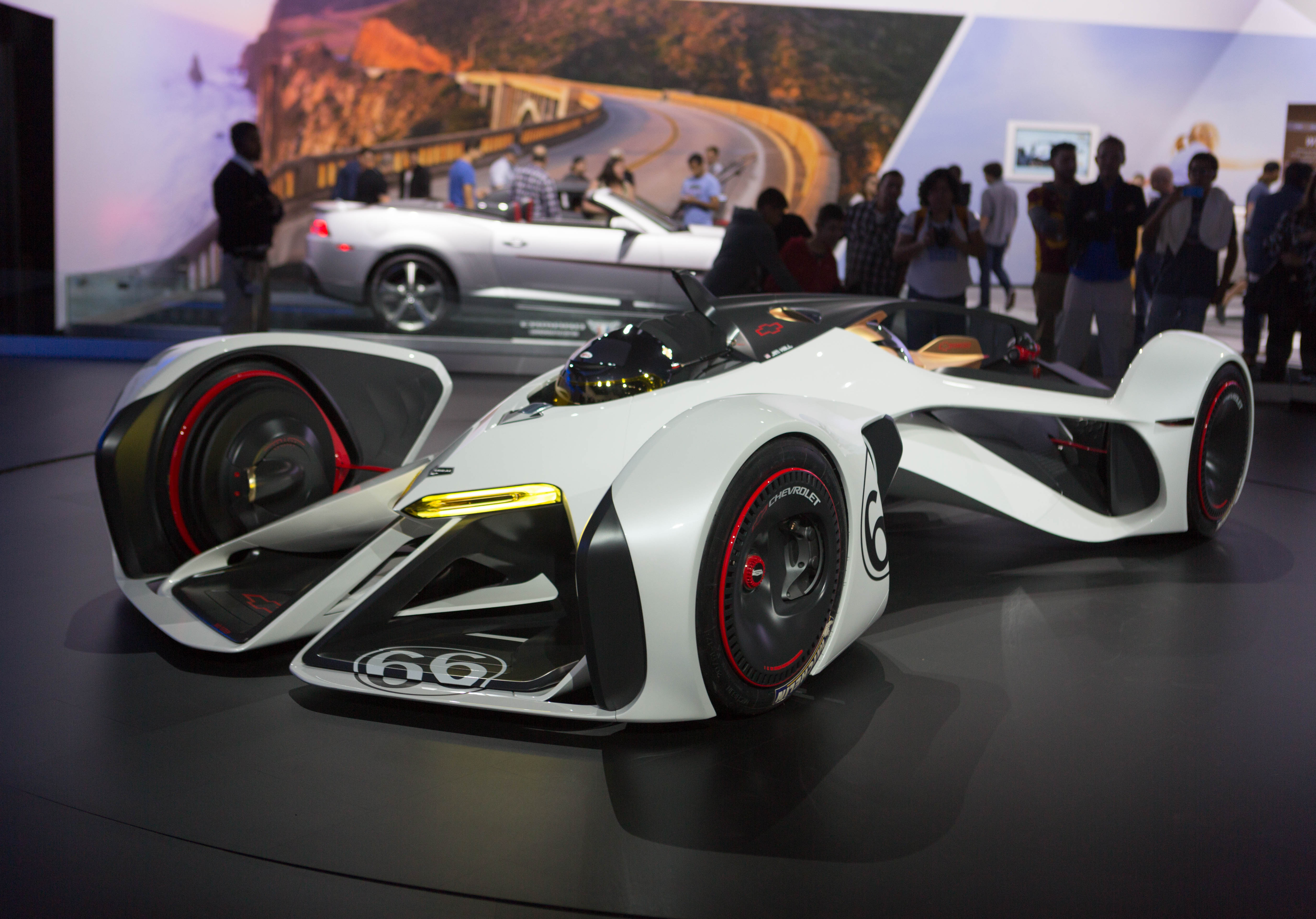
Chevrolet Chaparral 2X Vision Gran Turismo at the 2014 Los Angeles Auto Show

The Chevrolet-Chaparral 2X Vision Gran Turismo was released next, created by Chevrolet in collaboration with Chaparral (released on 17 December 2014, update 1.15). This vehicle, operated in the prone position, uses pulses of light to propel it to speeds of up to 417 kilometres per hour (259 mph). The vehicle can be seen as an extension of the driver's body, with controls located at the end of each limb in place of a steering wheel and the driver's head within a specialized helmet that integrates with the car's shape. The fictional laser propulsion unit, claimed to be developed by Chevrolet, can be aimed at a specific point on the track surface for increased downforce.

=== Infiniti CONCEPT Vision Gran Turismo ===
Alongside the Chevrolet-Chaparral 2X it was the "Infiniti CONCEPT Vision Gran Turismo" from Infiniti. The Infiniti CONCEPT Vision Gran Turismo was created out of Infiniti's desire to create a "pure Infiniti GT car" for the Vision Gran Turismo project. It is powered by a 4.5-litre naturally aspirated V8 engine, and possesses a 45:55 front/rear weight balance for optimum driving enjoyment.

In December 2018, the car was added to Asphalt 8: Airborne, being the first Vision Gran Turismo car to appear outside of the Gran Turismo series.

=== Mazda LM55 Vision Gran Turismo ===
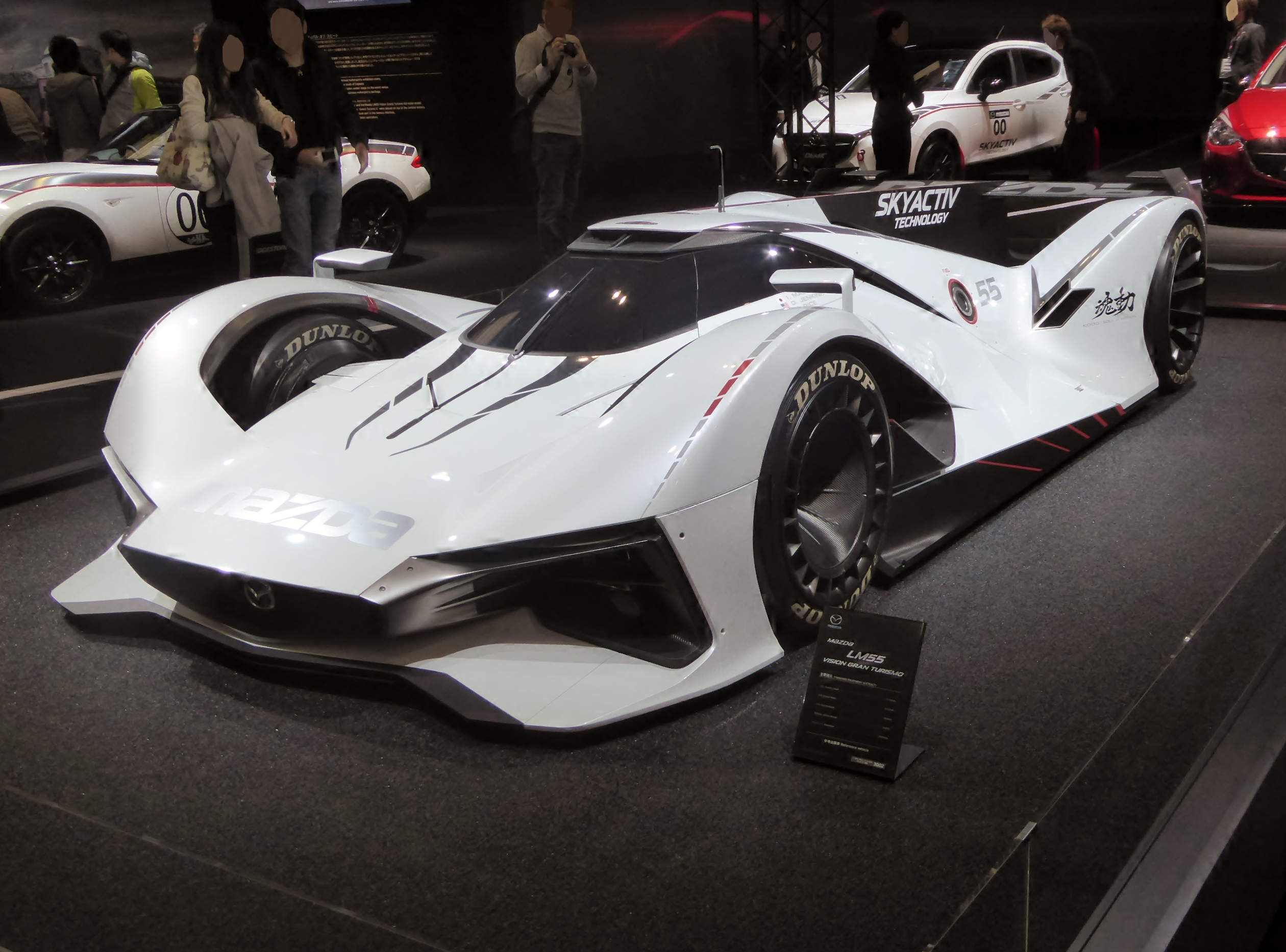
Mazda LM55 Vision Gran Turismo at the 2016 Osaka Motor Messe

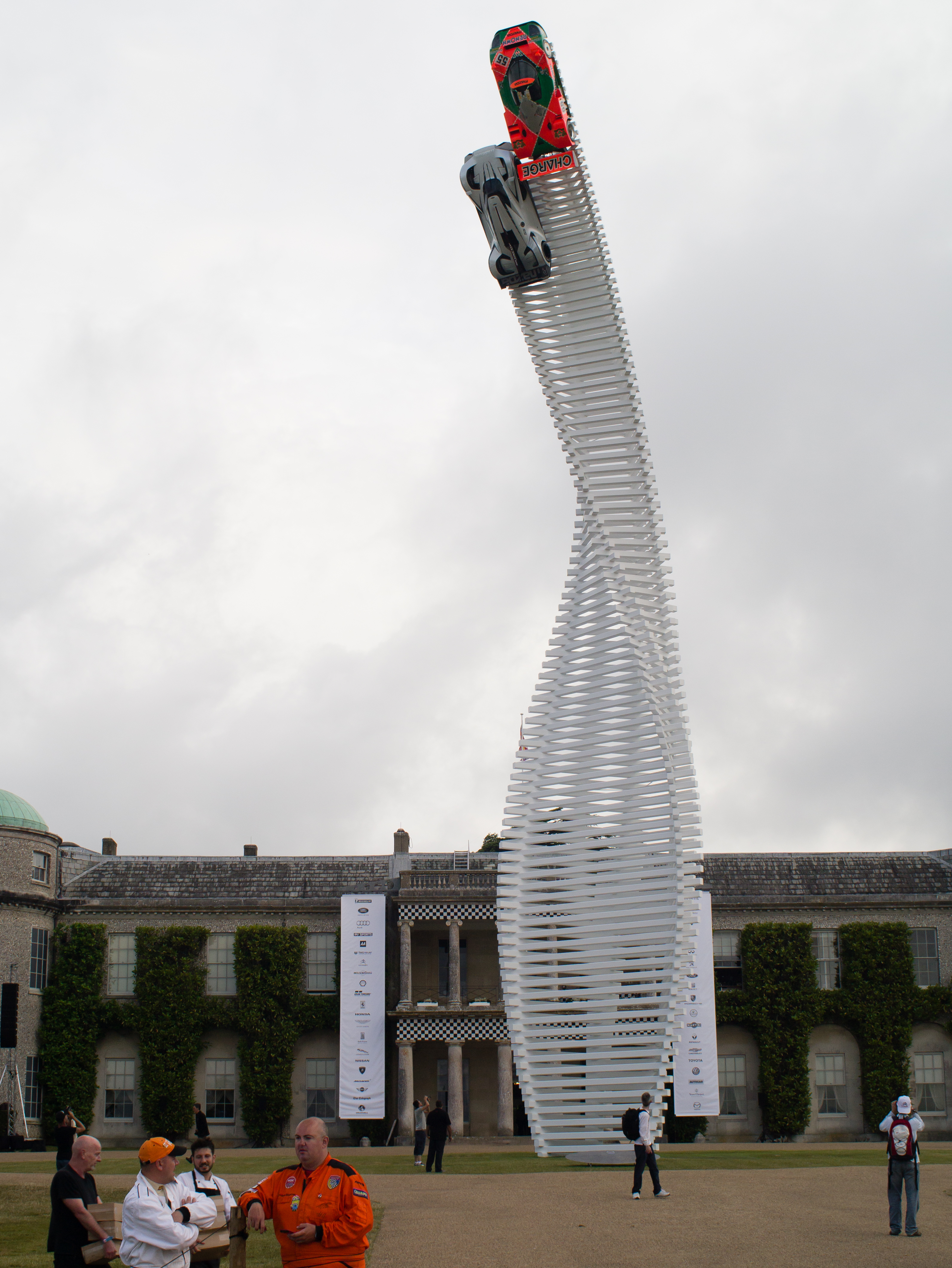
The LM55 Vision Gran Turismo (left) alongside the 787B as part of the Goodwood sculpture

The Mazda LM55 Vision Gran Turismo from Mazda was released on 24 December 2014 through its own update and originally found by players before its confirmed addition to the game. It is a low-slung Le Mans Prototype powered by a Skyactiv rotary engine with unknown specifications, and draws inspiration from the company's own 787B Group C car combined with their current "Kodo" design language.

The LM55 was included as part of a sculpture displayed at the 2015 Goodwood Festival of Speed, which was subsequently recreated in GT6's version of the Goodwood course for update 1.20.

=== Mini Clubman Vision Gran Turismo ===
Another nine cars were added in 2015 for GT6, with a Mini being the first. Revealed as the Mini Clubman Vision Gran Turismo, the car was added to update 1.16, released on 26 February 2015. A widebody hatchback with X-shaped stickers on the round headlights to simulate tape (used decades ago to keep broken headlight lenses from littering the track), the Clubman Vision Gran Turismo was designed solely for racing.

=== Alpine Vision Gran Turismo ===
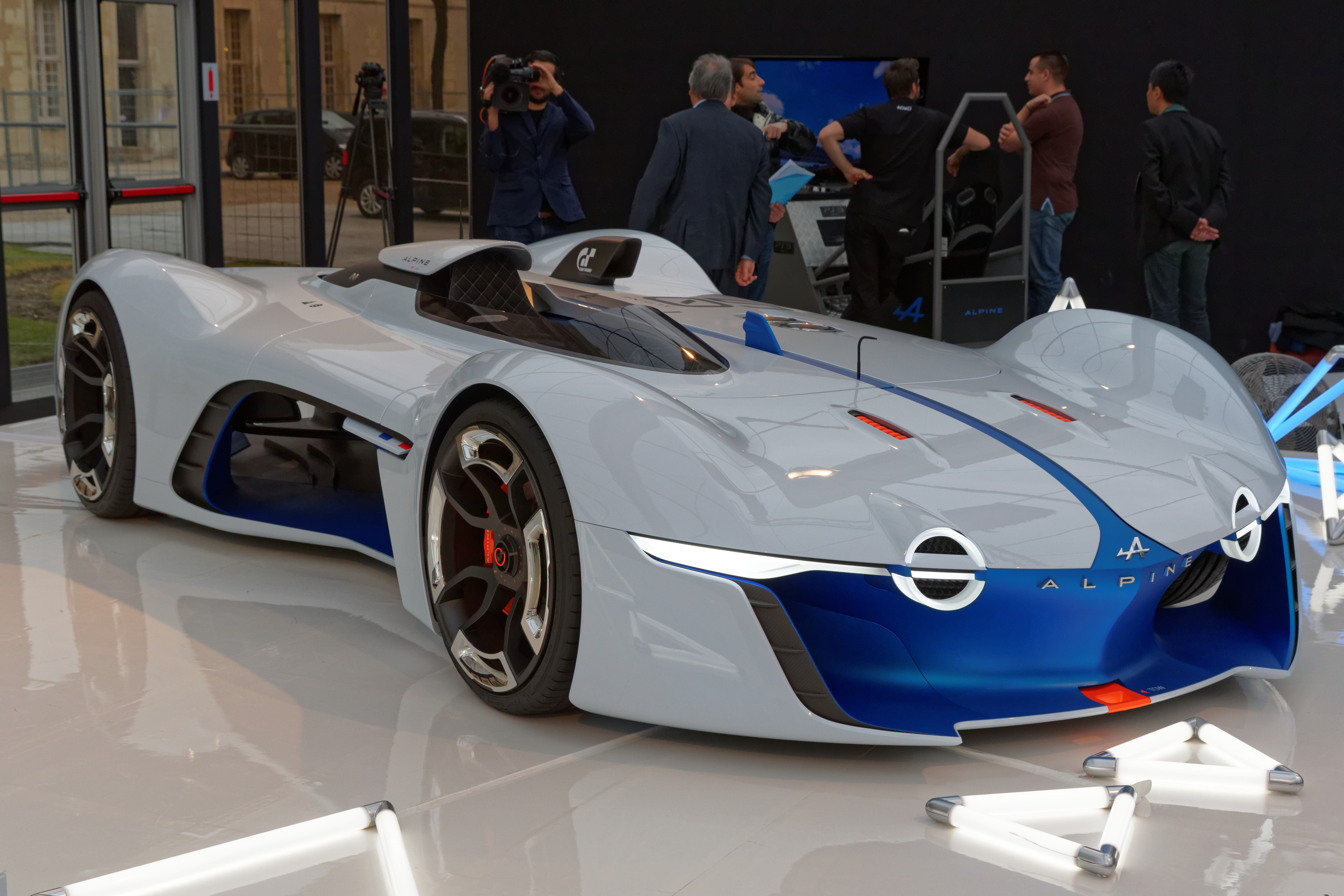
Alpine Vision Gran Turismo at the 2015 Festival Automobile International

Three cars were revealed a month later on 18 March 2015 in update 1.17, two of which were from Alpine. The Alpine Vision Gran Turismo is an open-top car with a focus on agility. Active aero panels are integrated into the rear fenders and deploy upon braking; the inner faces of the panels contain brake lights that are only visible when the panels are deployed. The "Race Mode" is a more hardcore version with an added rear wing for improved handling.

=== Lexus LF-LC GT Vision Gran Turismo ===
Lexus revealed their LF-LC alongside Alpine's concept cars in update 1.17. Much like the earlier FT-1 Vision GT, the Lexus LF-LC GT Vision Gran Turismo is a touring car-style refresh of Lexus' earlier Lexus LF-LC concept car. The in-sim car sports a unique livery featuring iridescent brush strokes on the otherwise white body.

=== Volkswagen GTI Supersport Vision Gran Turismo ===
Volkswagen's second Vision Gran Turismo car was added to the game on 13 April 2015 in update 1.18, known as the Volkswagen GTI Supersport Vision Gran Turismo. Unlike its Roadster counterpart, the Supersport is a closed-cockpit car, with larger headlights and taillights. Its engine is assumed to be the same as the one in the Roadster, with an identical configuration and power output.

=== Peugeot Vision Gran Turismo ===
Peugeot would release their first of three Vision Gran Turismo cars in the program, the first one known simply as the Peugeot Vision Gran Turismo. The car was added in update 1.19, on 31 May 2015. It is powered by a midship-mounted 3.2-litre V6 and has an active rear wing.

=== SRT Tomahawk Vision Gran Turismo ===
The final three cars added to the Gran Turismo 6 sim were all from SRT, the performance division of Dodge. The cars were collectively known as the SRT Tomahawk Vision Gran Turismo, and came in three different trim levels: S, GTS-R, and X. The Tomahawks, having been designed for 2035, possess various technologies that cannot be attained at the present day, such as ultra-lightweight graphene construction and tires that can withstand speeds of over 650 kilometres per hour (400 mph).

The Tomahawks were added in the sim's third-last update patch, 1.20, released on 26 June 2015. They became the last VGT cars added to Gran Turismo 6, owing to the upcoming cessation of support for the PlayStation 3.

=== Release history ===
Release history (Gran Turismo 6)
Year	Exact date	Update	Car	Country	Lead
2013	2013/11/19	1.01	Mercedes-Benz AMG Vision Gran Turismo	(Germany)	Gorden Wagener
2014	2014/01/27	1.04	Mercedes-Benz AMG Vision Gran Turismo Racing Series	(Germany)	Gorden Wagener
2014	2014/05/13	1.07	BMW Vision Gran Turismo	(Germany)	Adrian van Hooydonk
2014	2014/05/29	1.08	Mitsubishi Concept XR-PHEV Evolution Vision Gran Turismo	(Japan)	Tsunehiro Kunimoto
2014	2014/06/17	1.09	Volkswagen GTI Roadster Vision Gran Turismo	(Germany)	Klaus Bischoff
2014	2014/07/24	1.10	Nissan Concept 2020 Vision Gran Turismo	(Japan)	Michael Rienth
2014	2014/07/24	1.10	Aston Martin DP100 Vision Gran Turismo	(United Kingdom)	Marek Reichman
2014	2014/09/15	1.11	Toyota FT-1 Vision Gran Turismo	(Japan)	Kevin Hunter
2014	2014/11/18	1.14	Subaru VIZIV GT Vision Gran Turismo	(Japan)	Mamoru Ishii
2014	2014/12/16	1.15	Infiniti CONCEPT Vision Gran Turismo	(Japan)	Ruo-Xiang Huang; Liu Zheming
2014	2014/12/16	1.15	Chevrolet Chaparral 2X Vision Gran Turismo	(United States)	Ed Welburn
2014	2014/12/24	Individual	Mazda LM55 Vision Gran Turismo	(Japan)	Ikuo Maeda
2015	2015/02/25	1.16	MINI Clubman Vision Gran Turismo	(United Kingdom)	Anders Warming
2015	2015/03/17	1.17	Alpine Vision Gran Turismo	(France)	Antony Villain
2015	2015/03/17	1.17	Alpine Vision Gran Turismo Race Mode	(France)	Antony Villain
2015	2015/03/17	1.17	Lexus LF-LC GT Vision Gran Turismo	(Japan)	Mark Templin
2015	2015/04/13	1.18	Volkswagen GTI Supersport Vision Gran Turismo	(Germany)	Klaus Bischoff
2015	2015/05/31	1.19	Peugeot Vision Gran Turismo	(France)	Gilles Vidal
2015	2015/06/25	1.20	SRT Tomahawk S Vision Gran Turismo	(United States)	Ralph Gilles
2015	2015/06/25	1.20	SRT Tomahawk GTS-R Vision Gran Turismo	(United States)	Ralph Gilles
2015	2015/06/25	1.20	SRT Tomahawk X Vision Gran Turismo	(United States)	Ralph Gilles

== Gran Turismo Sport ==
The first four VGT cars to debut in Gran Turismo Sport were all announced before the original release of the game and subsequently released in beta versions.

=== Hyundai N 2025 Vision Gran Turismo ===
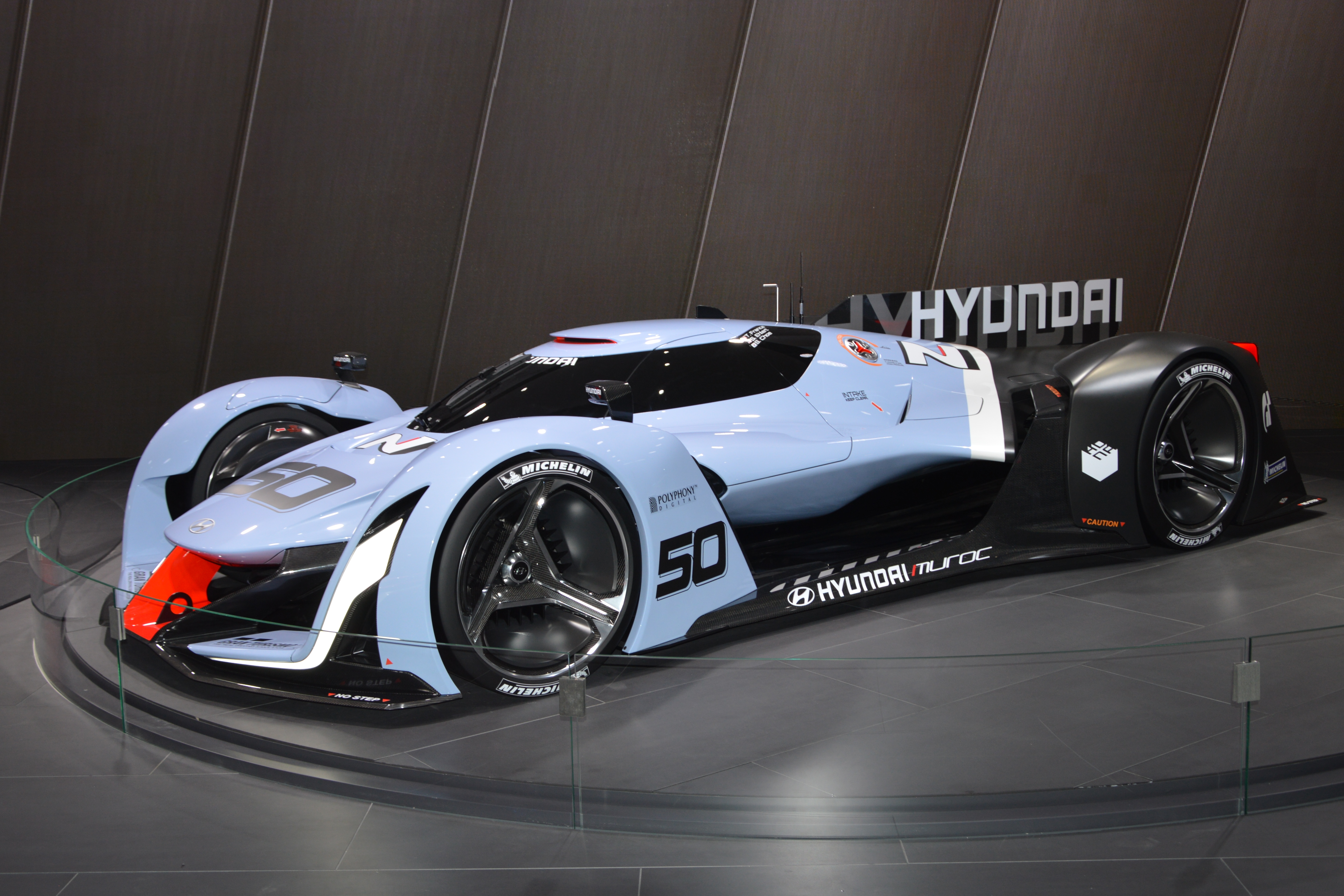
Hyundai N 2025 Vision Gran Turismo

Hyundai Motor Company were the first to announce their car—the Hyundai N 2025 Vision Gran Turismo, first launched on 14 September 2015 and later first playable in the closed beta version of Gran Turismo Sport. The car served as a launch platform for Hyundai's N performance division, as well as a glimpse into the future of fuel cell technology in motorsports.

=== Bugatti Vision Gran Turismo ===
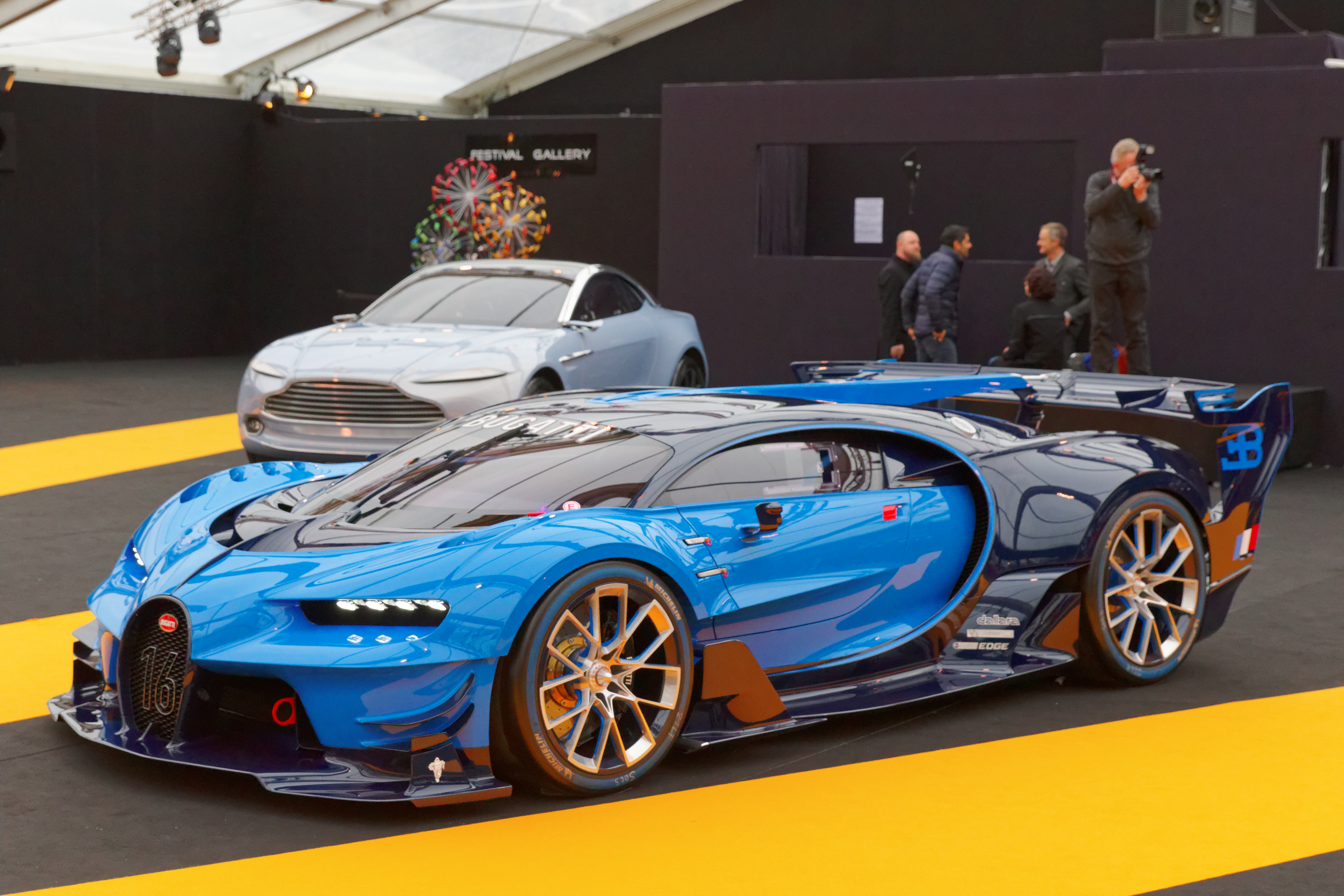
Bugatti Vision Gran Turismo at the 2016 Festival Automobile International

Bugatti became the second to unveil their Bugatti Vision Gran Turismo, which was originally teased in a trailer titled #imaginEBugatti. The car was unveiled two weeks later, releasing on 24 September 2015. It is essentially a racing-oriented precursor to the Chiron with Bugatti's then-signature W16 engine, and pays homage to the Bugatti Type 57s that won the 24 Hours of Le Mans in 1937 and 1939.

=== Fittipaldi EF7 Vision Gran Turismo by Pininfarina ===
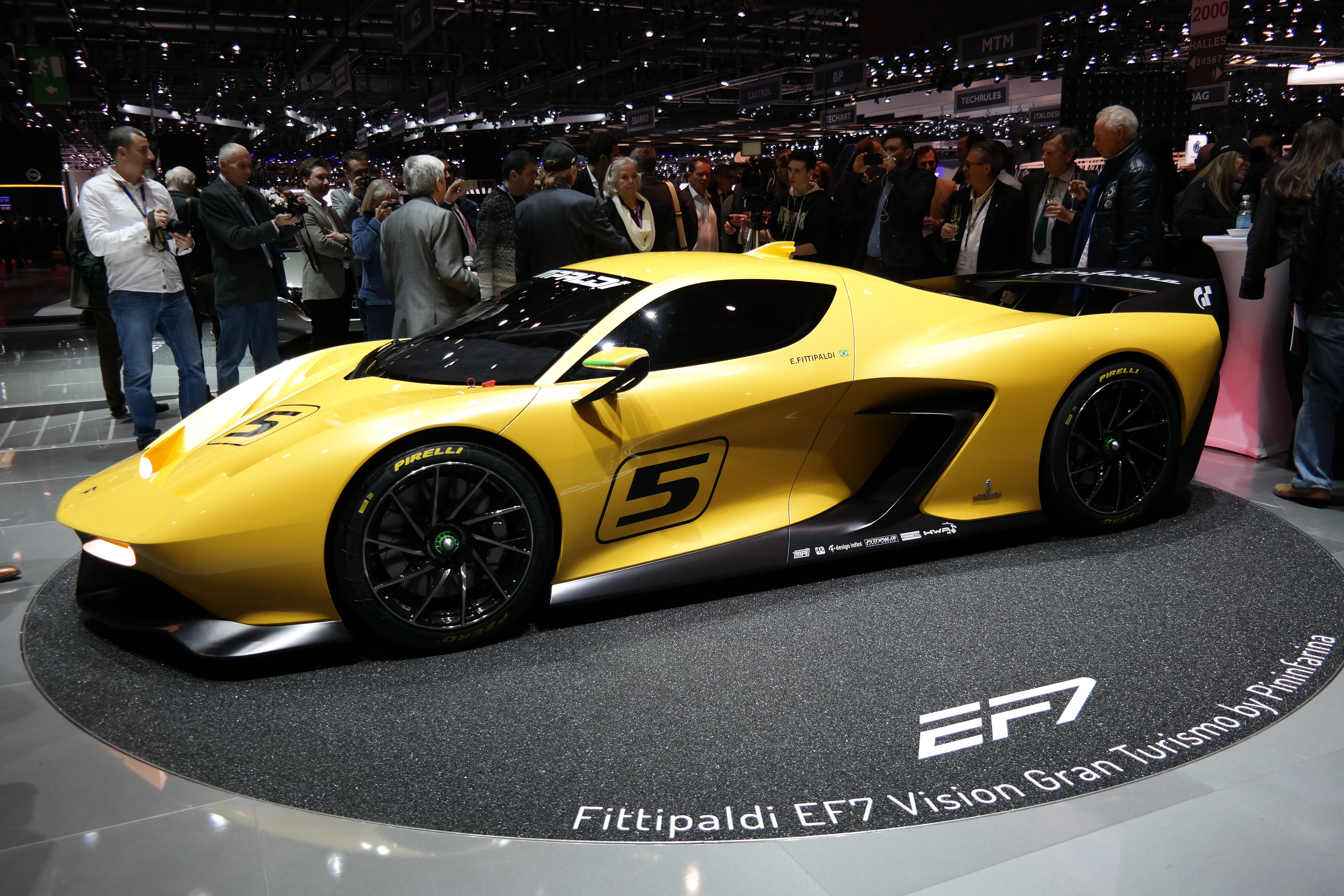
Fittipaldi EF7 Vision Gran Turismo at the 2017 Geneva Motor Show

On 1 February 2017, Fittipaldi Motors, headed by Emerson Fittipaldi, teased their Vision GT car, the Fittipaldi EF7 Vision Gran Turismo by Pininfarina, a collaboration between Fittipaldi, Pininfarina, and HWA. The model for the car was revealed on 7 March 2017 at the Geneva International Motor Show. A limited production run of 39 track-only vehicles was planned, with owners eligible for race coaching from Fittipaldi himself.

Production did not come to fruition when the company became inactive in March 2019; the EF7 was subsequently absent in Gran Turismo 7.

=== McLaren Ultimate Vision Gran Turismo ===
On 20 September 2017, McLaren Automotive teased their Vision GT car, the McLaren Ultimate Vision Gran Turismo. It was revealed the next day. For a vastly improved field of vision, the car is driven in a prone position (but from within a closed cockpit and using a steering wheel, unlike the Chaparral 2X), and it also possesses a hybrid system and lightweight structure.

The Ultimate Vision GT's design influenced the McLaren Sabre, a limited model built by McLaren Special Operations for sale in the United States, and later the McLaren Solus GT.

=== Daihatsu Copen RJ Vision Gran Turismo ===
Daihatsu added their own VGT car based on the second-generation Copen, called the Daihatsu Copen RJ Vision Gran Turismo ("RJ" for "Racing Jacket"). It is a closed-top version of the Copen with performance improvements.

=== Peugeot L500R and L750R Hybrid Vision Gran Turismo ===
Peugeot also added a second and third car to the program, dubbed the Peugeot L500R Hybrid Vision Gran Turismo, and its racing variant, the Peugeot L750R Hybrid Vision Gran Turismo. Both cars were added in the first stable release of the game. The L500R had initially been presented as a concept car honoring Peugeot's 1916 Indianapolis 500 victory in 2016, with no mention of the Vision Gran Turismo program in its initial launch.

=== IsoRivolta Zagato Vision Gran Turismo ===
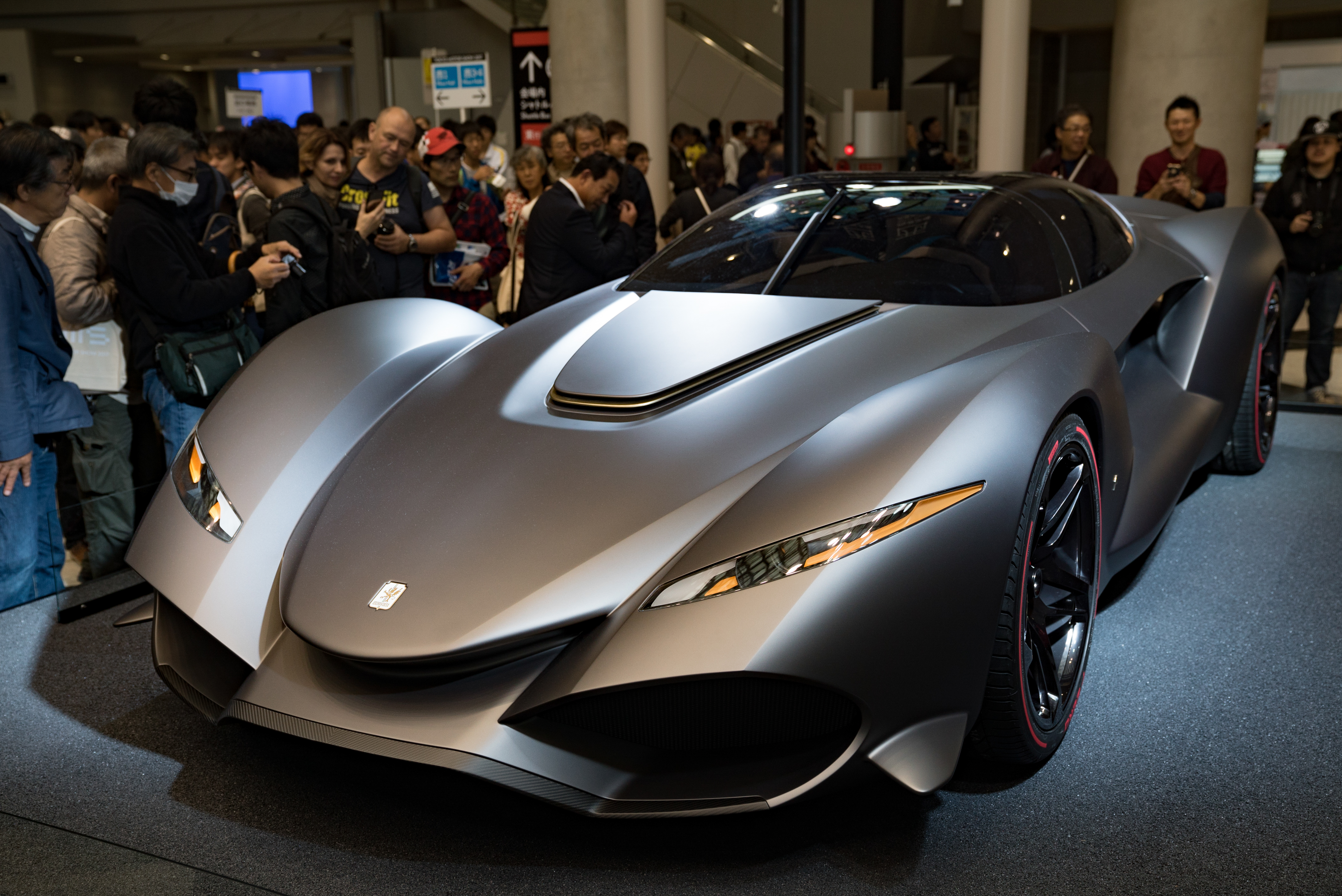
IsoRivolta Zagato Vision Gran Turismo at the 45th Tokyo Motor Show in 2017

IsoRivolta and Zagato revealed their car on 24 October 2017 as the IsoRivolta Zagato Vision Gran Turismo. The car was added in the 1.06 update and features a Chevrolet-supplied V8 with an output of 559 bhp (417 kW; 567 PS).

=== Honda Sports Vision Gran Turismo ===
The last Vision Gran Turismo car of 2017 came on November 9, when Honda debuted the Honda Sports Vision Gran Turismo. At its core a smaller version of the Honda NSX, it weighs just 903.6 kg (1,992 lb) and is powered by a mid-mounted 2-litre turbocharged inline-four engine producing 301 kW (404 hp).

Patent designs filed in 2015 for the car, along with the related "ZSX" trademark filing the following year, caused media speculation about a potential Honda S2000 successor positioned below the NSX; Honda has since denied any plans to put such car into production.

=== Audi e-tron Vision Gran Turismo ===
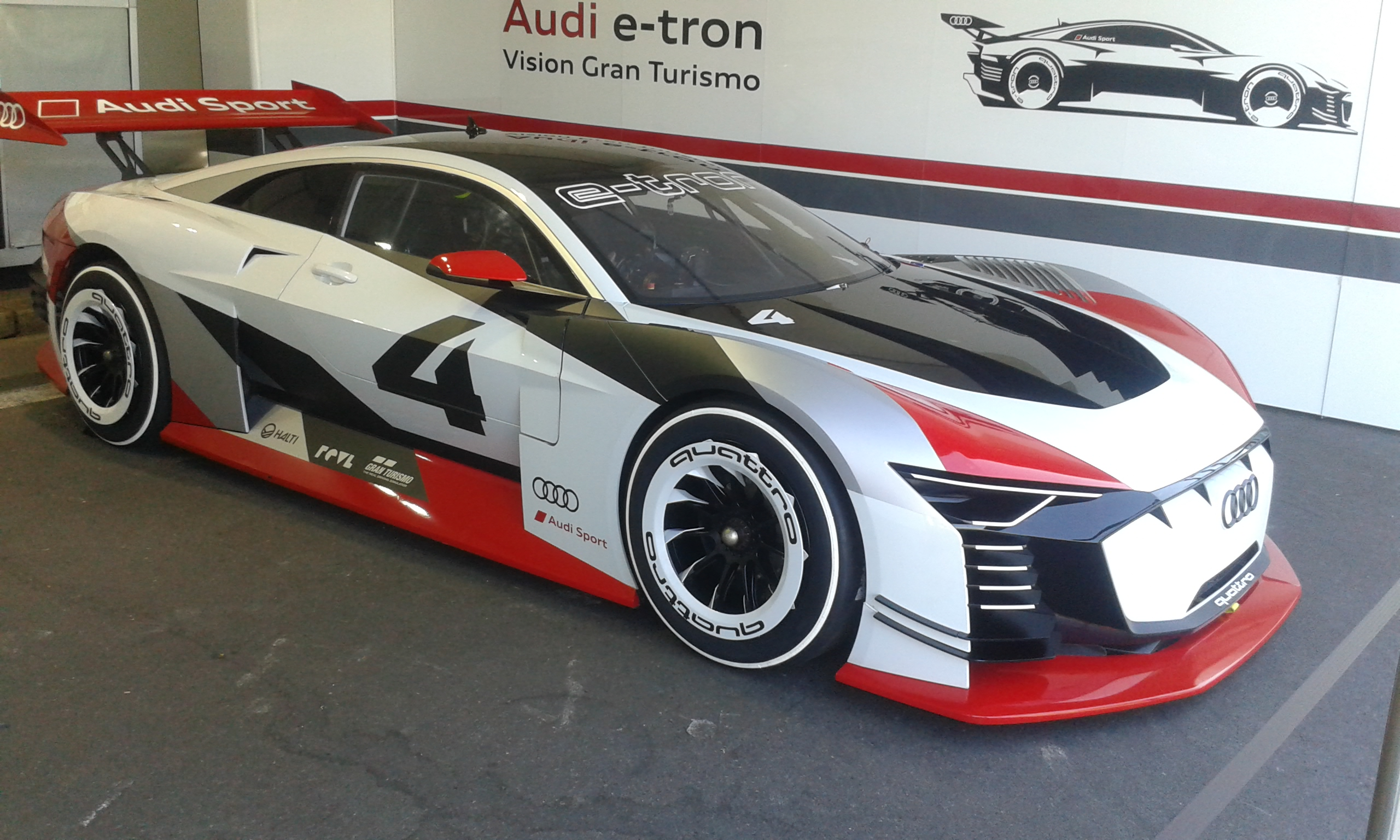
Audi e-tron Vision Gran Turismo displayed at the Paris ePrix

On 4 April 2018, Audi Sport GmbH teased their Vision Gran Turismo car under the YouTube channel of Gran Turismo. The car was revealed four days later in fully functioning form, and in Gran Turismo Sport, as the Audi e-tron Vision Gran Turismo. Another car was revealed alongside the e-tron, but abandons the "e-tron" moniker and uses a 3.4-liter turbocharged V6, making it a hybrid. This car was simply named the "Audi Vision Gran Turismo" and only exists in-game.

=== Jaguar Vision Gran Turismo Coupé ===
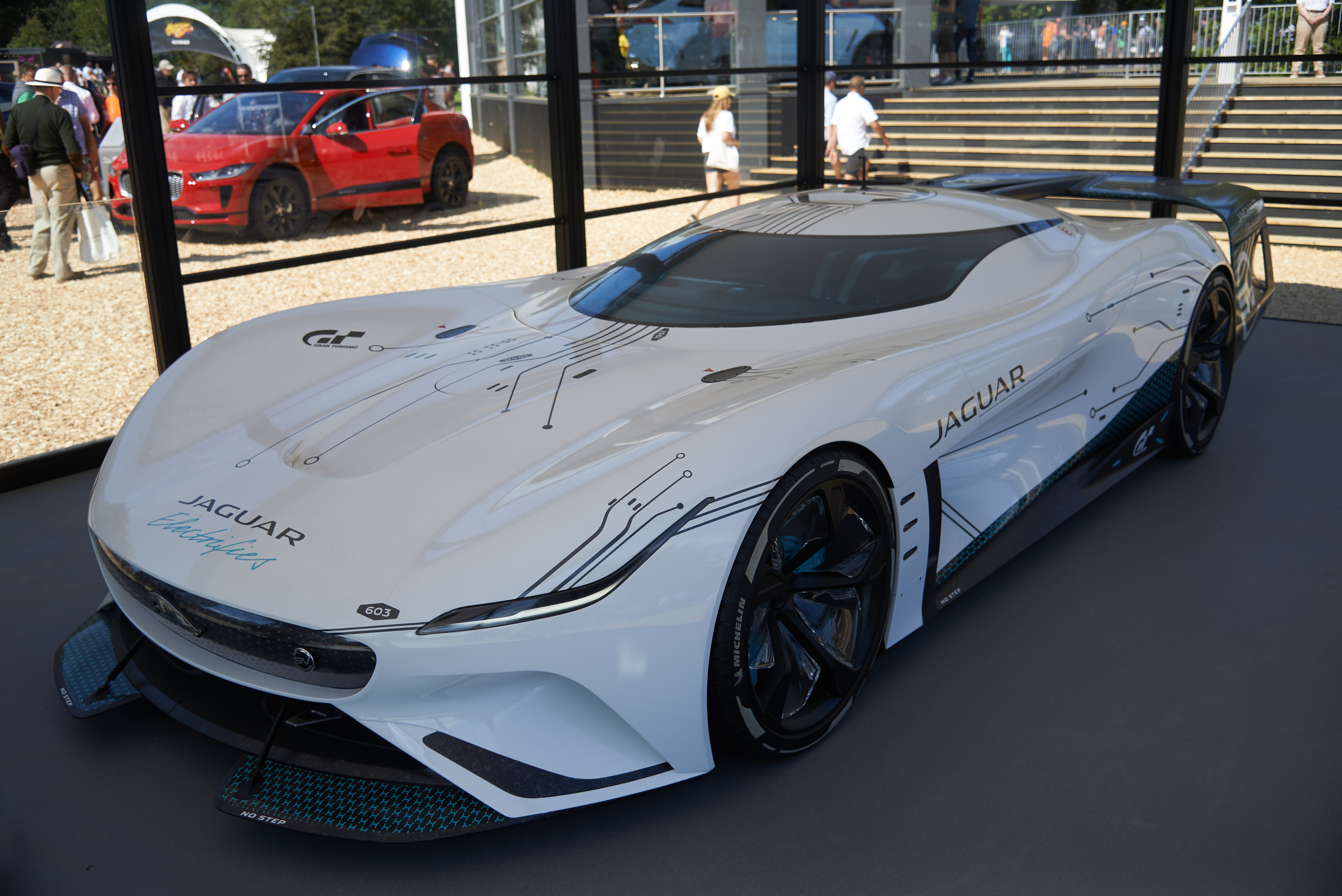
Jaguar Vision Gran Turismo SV at the Goodwood Festival of Speed

After more than a year of inactivity concerning the Vision Gran Turismo program, Jaguar officially unveiled their Vision Gran Turismo Coupé on 25 October 2019. The car takes the form of a grand touring coupé and is powered by three electric motors, which produce a total power output of 750 kW (1,010 hp). It was added to Sport on 28 November 2019.

Gran Turismo 7 adds the Vision Gran Turismo Roadster open top variant, as well as the Vision Gran Turismo SV, a racing variant of the Vision Gran Turismo Coupé unveiled in December 2020. The latter has a large fixed wing and four motors instead of three for a total power output of 1,400 kW (1,877 hp).

=== Release history ===
Release history (Gran Turismo Sport)
Year	Exact date	Update	Car	Country	Lead
2015	2015/09/14	Beta	Hyundai N 2025 Vision Gran Turismo	(South Korea)	Albert Biermann
2015	2015/09/24	Beta	Bugatti Vision Gran Turismo	(France)	Achim Anscheidt
2017	2017/04/27	Beta	Fittipaldi EF7 Vision Gran Turismo by Pininfarina	(United States)	Paolo Pininfarina
2017	2017/09/21	Beta	McLaren Ultimate Vision Gran Turismo	(United Kingdom)	Rob Melville
2017	2017/10/17	Stable release	Daihatsu Copen RJ Vision Gran Turismo	(Japan)	Kiyoto Hiwada; Takamasa Omori
2017	2017/10/17	Stable release	Peugeot L500R HYbrid Vision Gran Turismo	(France)	Vadim Gilca
2017	2017/10/17	Stable release	Peugeot L750R HYbrid Vision Gran Turismo	(France)	Vadim Gilca
2017	2017/10/24	1.06	IsoRivolta Zagato Vision Gran Turismo	(Italy)	Andrea Zagato
2017	2017/11/09	Individual	Honda Sports Vision Gran Turismo	(Japan)	Ben Davidson
2018	2018/04/08	1.17	Audi e-tron Vision Gran Turismo	(Germany)	Marc Lichte
2018	2018/04/08	1.17	Audi Vision Gran Turismo	(Germany)	Marc Lichte
2019	2019/11/28	1.50	Jaguar Vision Gran Turismo Coupé	(United Kingdom)	Julian Thomson

=== Race-regulated variants ===
Several of the Vision Gran Turismo cars have variants that have been modified and homologated to meet regulations for race classes, such as Group GT3 and the WEC. All unmodified base VGT cars are in the open "Group X" category, intended for vehicles not suitable for other categories.

Race-regulated Vision Gran Turismo cars
Name	Country	Class	Base model
Volkswagen GTI Roadster Vision Gran Turismo (Gr. 3)	(Germany)	Group 3	Volkswagen GTI Roadster Vision Gran Turismo
Toyota FT-1 Vision Gran Turismo (Gr. 3)	(Japan)	Group 3	Toyota FT-1 Vision Gran Turismo
Mazda LM55 Vision Gran Turismo (Gr. 1)	(Japan)	Group 1	Mazda LM55 Vision Gran Turismo
Peugeot Vision Gran Turismo (Gr. 3)	(France)	Group 3	Peugeot Vision Gran Turismo
Alpine Vision Gran Turismo 2017	(France)	Group 1	Alpine Vision Gran Turismo
SRT Tomahawk Vision Gran Turismo (Gr. 1)	(United States)	Group 1	SRT Tomahawk GTS-R Vision Gran Turismo
Hyundai N 2025 Vision Gran Turismo (Gr. 1)	(South Korea)	Group 1	Hyundai N 2025 Vision Gran Turismo
Bugatti Vision Gran Turismo (Gr. 1)	(France)	Group 1	Bugatti Vision Gran Turismo
Peugeot L750R HYbrid Vision Gran Turismo	(France)	Group 1	Peugeot L500R HYbrid Vision Gran Turismo
Audi Vision Gran Turismo	(Germany)	Group 1	Audi e-tron Vision Gran Turismo

== Gran Turismo 7 ==
=== Lamborghini Lambo V12 Vision Gran Turismo ===
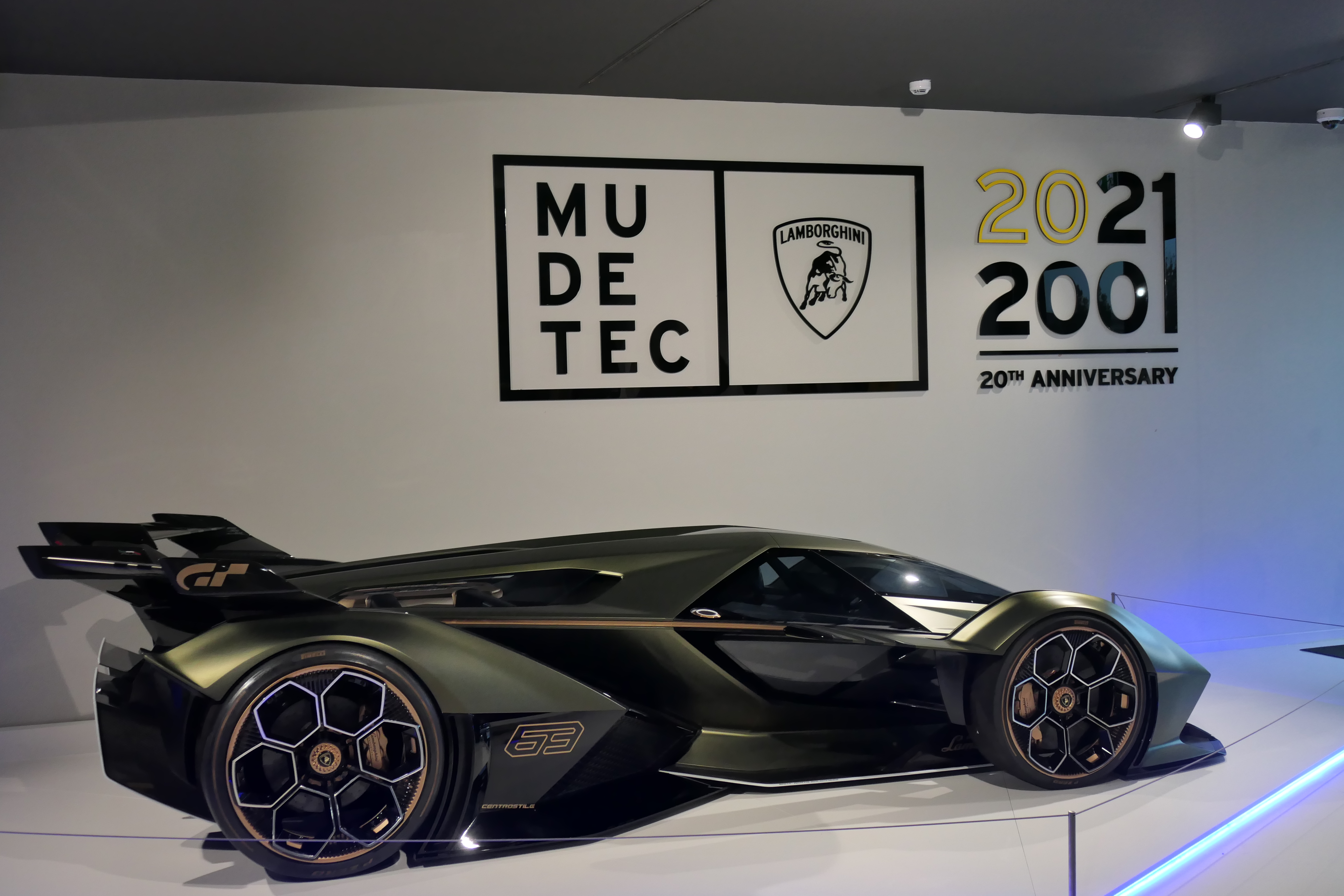
Lamborghini Lambo V12 Vision Gran Turismo at Museo Lamborghini

On 24 November 2019 (the day of the 2019 FIA GTC World Finals), Lamborghini revealed the Lambo V12 Vision Gran Turismo—a single-seat performance car, loosely resembling a sports prototype, powered by the same V12 hybrid powertrain as the Sián FKP 37. Despite being unveiled when updates for Sport were still active (with the last Sport update as of November 2021 being 1.66 in July 2021, which added the second-generation Toyota GR86), the car was only first seen in action in the Gran Turismo 7 release date trailer.

Lego released an official set of the Lambo V12 Vision Gran Turismo in May 2024 under its Speed Champions line.

=== Porsche Vision Gran Turismo ===
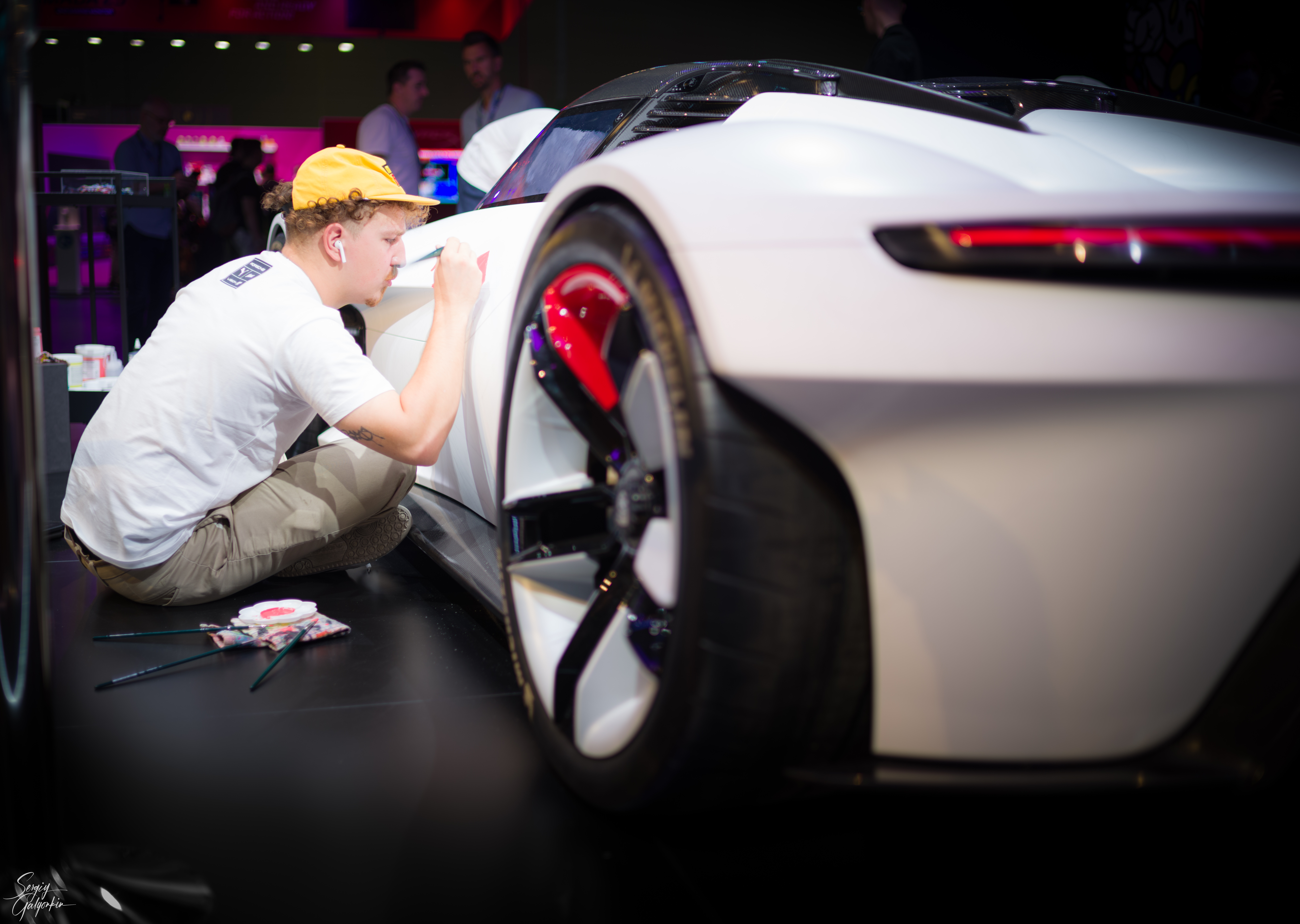
Porsche Vision Gran Turismo at Gamescom 2022

Unveiled on 5 December 2021, the Porsche Vision Gran Turismo is an electric two-seat sports car with mid-engined proportions and design cues from the brand's previous models, such as quadruple front LED headlight clusters, a rear light bar, and aggressively flared fenders. It is also the first (and currently only) Vision Gran Turismo vehicle to feature on the cover art of the games, as it is seen on the cover of GT7 alongside the Mazda RX-Vision GT3 Concept. A Spyder version of the car was first teased on 21 September 2022 and released with Update 1.23 on 29 September 2022.

A separate concept, the 2019 Porsche 920 Vision, was designed with the Vision Gran Turismo series in mind before a different design was decided upon.

=== Suzuki Vision Gran Turismo ===
First appearing in the form of a highlighted silhouette in a Twitter teaser post from Kazunori Yamauchi on 21 May 2022, the Suzuki Vision Gran Turismo was revealed in its entirety five days later. This two-seat roadster, whose design was inspired by the Cappuccino and third-generation Swift Sport, possesses a hybrid system in the form of a 1,340 cc (82 cu in) Suzuki Hayabusa engine and three electric motors. It can be seen as the successor to the MR-layout Suzuki GSX-R/4 concept from 2001, which was also a lightweight roadster powered by a Hayabusa engine (although the VGT, hybrid system aside, uses an FR layout).

A Group 3 variant of the Suzuki Vision Gran Turismo was later added in update 1.17 on June 23, 2022. This specific variant is powered by a twin-turbocharged 2.7-liter V8 engine formed by two Hayabusa engines on the same crankshaft, and lacks a hybrid system, making it rear-wheel drive only. The car has also been used in the first Gran Turismo World Series Nations Cup event of both the 2022 season and GT7.

=== Ferrari Vision Gran Turismo ===
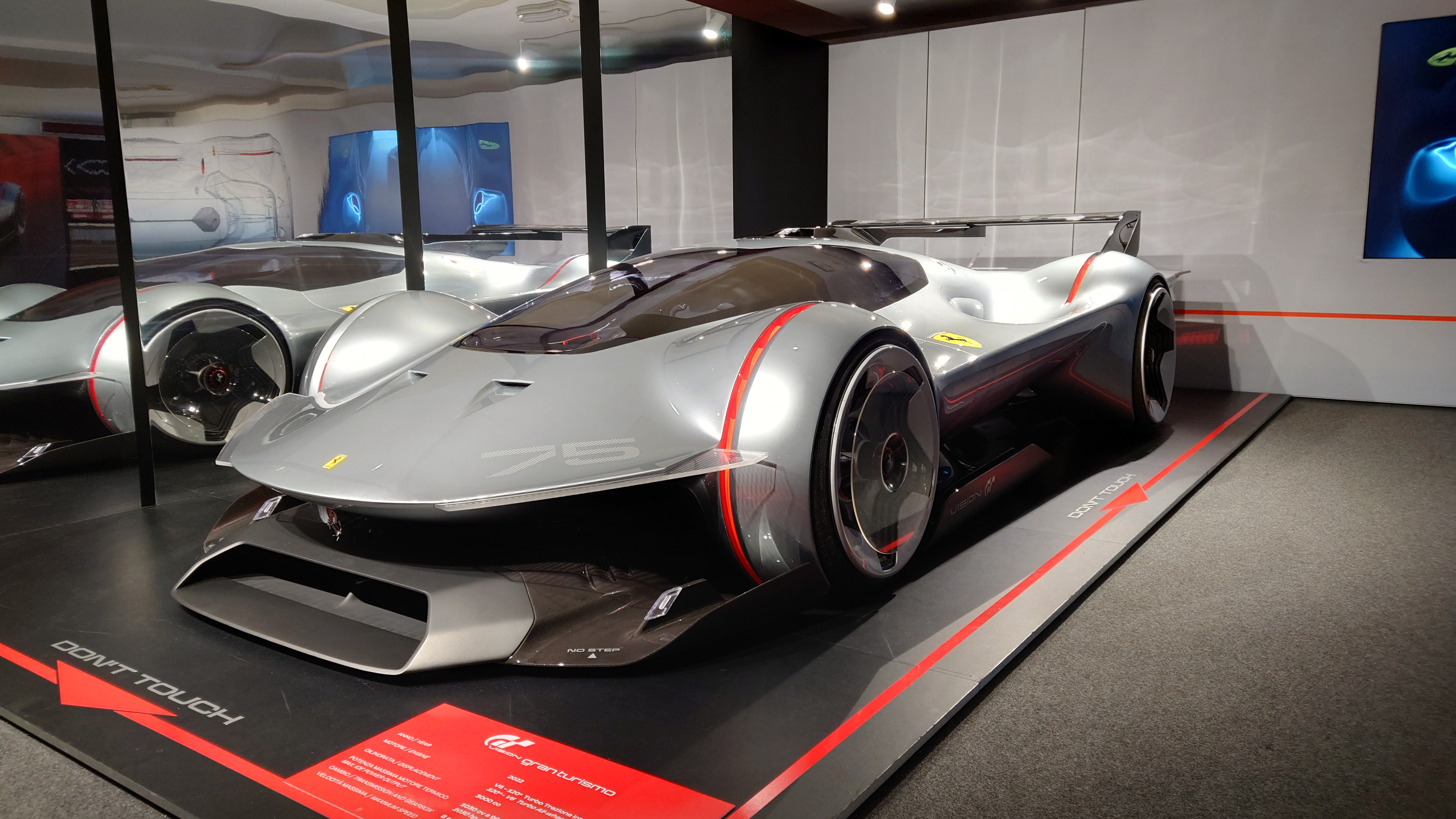
Ferrari Vision Gran Turismo at Museo Ferrari

The Ferrari Vision Gran Turismo is a high-performance concept car designed by Flavio Manzoni. Ferrari have said that the Vision Gran Turismo "represents a futuristic design manifesto for Ferrari's road and racing cars". It features the V6 engine recently developed for the 499P Le Mans Hypercar, which has been derestricted to produce 1,030 PS (760 kW; 1,020 hp) @ 9,000 rpm and 900 N⋅m (664 lb⋅ft) @ 5,500 rpm. Combined with the three electric motors, one of which is mounted at the rear and two of which are at the front to give the car permanent all-wheel drive, it achieves a total output of 1,356 PS (1,337 hp; 997 kW) and 1,100 N⋅m (811 lb⋅ft). The internal combustion engine's power is delivered to the rear wheels via an 8-speed dual-clutch transmission, which Ferrari says has been adapted from their Formula One program.

Entry into the single seat is via a canopy, similar to the Lamborghini Egoista. The car also incorporates various aerodynamic features, such as channels redirecting air around the cockpit to the sides of the car. The rear wing and diffuser also take inspiration from the 499P, along with design elements from the Modulo concept and 330 P3. Ferrari claims that the concept will lap the Fiorano Circuit (Ferrari's test circuit) in under 1 minute and 10 seconds, almost ten seconds faster than Ferrari's current flagship road car, the SF90.

=== Italdesign EXENEO Vision Gran Turismo ===
The Italdesign Exeneo Vision Gran Turismo was revealed on 20 February 2023. Similar in form factor to the Italdesign Parcour concept from 2013, the Exeneo forgoes windows in favour of solid carbon fibre and aluminum surfaces, and features an individual wheel drive (IWD) system, pairing a V10 engine with four electric motors to achieve a combined output of 910 kW (1,220 hp; 1,240 PS). The car's IWD and active suspension systems allow it to be driven on many surfaces, including snow and dirt. In GT7, the car is available in a "Street Mode" or "Off-Road Mode" configuration.

=== Genesis X Gran Berlinetta Vision Gran Turismo ===
Genesis X Gran Berlinetta Vision Gran Turismo

Bay Area-based Korean-American luxury manufacturer Genesis teased its Vision Gran Turismo car in 2021 at that year's Monterey Car Week, with three design proposals, named "Alpha_DB", "Bravo_GB", and "Charlie_ET"; these were revealed in conjunction with the marque's cars for the Gran Turismo World Series Manufacturers Cup, the Genesis G70 GR4 and the Genesis X GR3. The finalized model, named the Gran Berlinetta and representing the marque's "Athletic Elegance" design language, was revealed at the 2023 Gran Turismo World Series World Finals, and added to the game in January 2024. The X Gran Berlinetta is powered by a twin-turbocharged 3.3-liter Lambda V6 with electric supercharger technology producing 798 kW (1,070 hp; 1,085 PS), and can reach a top speed of over 400 km/h.

The Gran Berlinetta was followed by the Genesis X Gran Racer Vision Gran Turismo, a Group 1 version of the car intended as an endurance prototype, featuring aerodynamic enhancements. The Gran Racer was added to the game in the 1.49 update in July 2024. It has had its power output increased to 1,148 kW (1,539 hp; 1,561 PS).

=== BVLGARI Aluminium Vision Gran Turismo ===
The first Vision Gran Turismo vehicle from a non-automotive brand, the Bulgari Aluminium Vision Gran Turismo was revealed at the Gran Turismo World Series finals in Barcelona in 2023. Designed by former Centro Stile Fiat employee Fabrizio Buonamassa Stigliani and former Pininfarina Design Director Fabio Filippini (who had also worked on the Fittipaldi EF7), the car takes inspiration from Bulgari Aluminium chronometers, using rubberised elements to mimic the watch strap.

Bulgari also launched a limited-edition wristwatch alongside the vehicle, with special collectors' edition boxes granting early access to the vehicle in Gran Turismo 7—a month before it became available to the general public—through a QR code. The car was added in update 1.42 in January 2024, but could not be obtained through any other means until becoming available for general in-game purchase via update 1.43 in February 2024.

=== Škoda Vision Gran Turismo ===
Czech manufacturer Škoda announced it would be joining the Gran Turismo series for the first time with a teaser of a Vision Gran Turismo car in April 2024, ahead of a full reveal later that month. The car is described as an all-electric, all-wheel drive single-seater, inspired by the 1957 Škoda 1100 OHC roadster and designed by Oliver Stefani. The car became available in version 1.46 on 25 April 2024.

=== Xiaomi Vision Gran Turismo ===
Xiaomi Vision Gran Turismo at MWC Barcelona 2026

A Vision Gran Turismo car from the automotive arm of Chinese brand Xiaomi, Xiaomi Auto, was announced at the Gran Turismo World Series event in London in June 2025, as part of a wider brand collaboration that would see Xiaomi become the first Chinese marque in the Gran Turismo series' history with its SU7 Ultra. The car was officially revealed in 2026 February edition of Xiaomi Launch event, with physical appearance presented in Mobile World Congress at Barcelona in March 2026. The car featuring a "sculpted by the wind" aerodynamic design with a 0.29 drag coefficient, a central "Sofa Racer" cocoon cockpit, and integration into Xiaomi's "Human x Car x Home" smart ecosystem. The Xiaomi Vision Gran Turismo appeared in the Spec IV updates video presentation during a State of Play in September 2026 as one of the twelve cars added during the future updates. Details of its release date, confirmed to be either in the October or the December update of the game, are yet to be discovered.

=== Chevrolet Corvette CX.R Vision Gran Turismo ===
Chevrolet revealed its Vision Gran Turismo car during the Monterey Car Week in August 2025. The car, called the CX.R Vision Gran Turismo, was unveiled by Chevrolet executive design director Phil Zak and Kazunori Yamauchi, and is a motorsport variant of the CX Concept which was revealed at the same event. Whereas the CX is all-electric, with a 2000 hp, four-motor layout, the CX.R employs a hybrid setup comprising a 900 hp, two-liter V8 along with two individual front wheel motors and a third motor within the gearbox. Both cars were added to the game in its August 2025 update.

=== Opel Corsa GSE Vision Gran Turismo ===
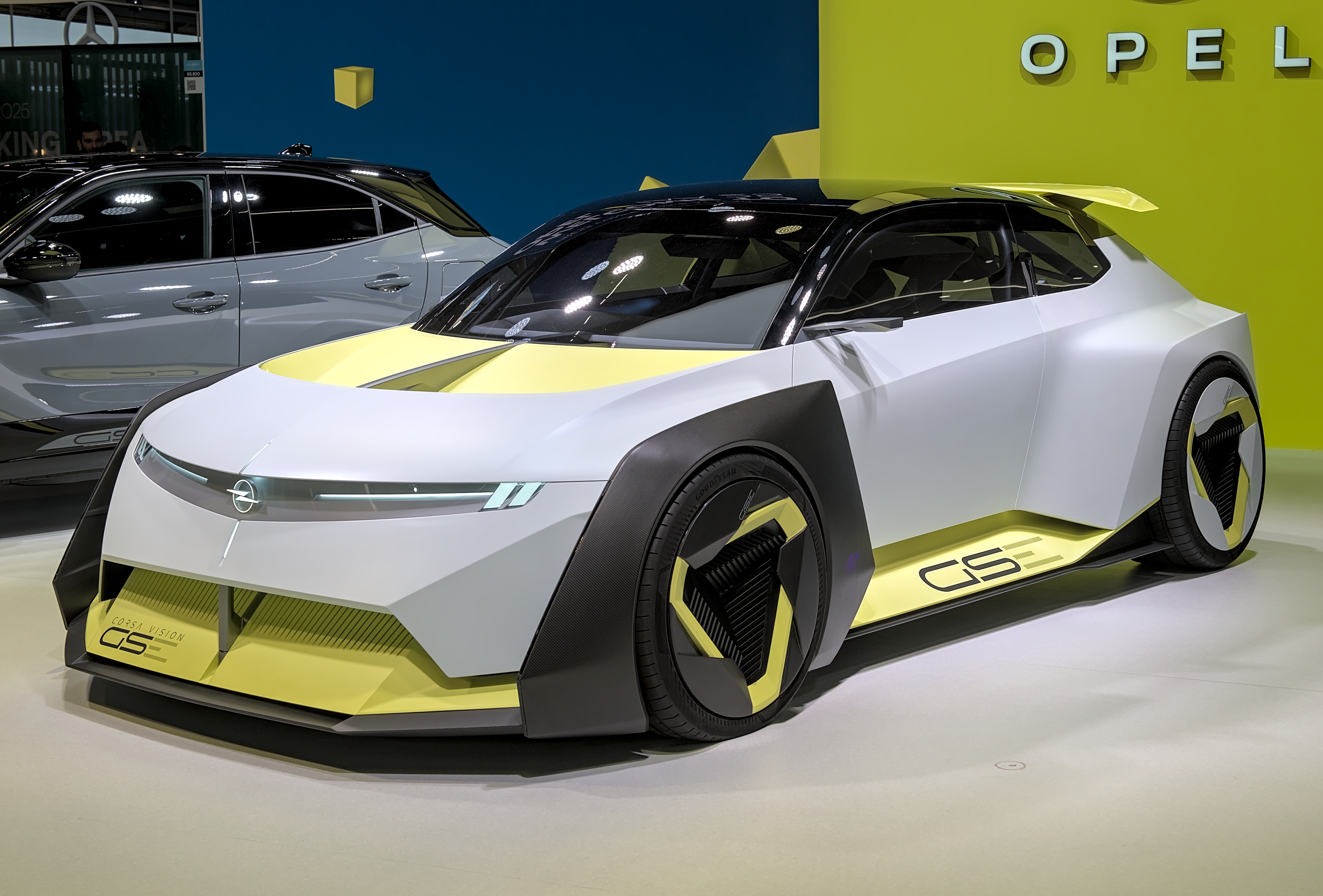
Opel Corsa GSE Vision Gran Turismo at IAA (2025)

Stellantis announced that it would be presenting a Vision Gran Turismo car under the European twin Opel/Vauxhall brands, with the Corsa GSE concept intended to preview the design and technology of the next-generation Corsa and the performance GSE sub-brand. First revealed in August 2025, the Corsa GSE Vision Gran Turismo would be presented as a full-size model at the IAA Mobility show in Munich in September 2025 and at the subsequent GT World Series event in Berlin later in the month, ahead of arriving in-game under the Opel brand alone in the autumn.

=== Release history ===
Release history (Gran Turismo 7)
Year	Exact date	Update	Car	Country	Lead
2022	2022/03/04	Stable release	Lamborghini Lambo V12 Vision Gran Turismo	(Italy)	Mitja Borkert
2022	2022/03/04	Stable release	Jaguar Vision Gran Turismo SV	(United Kingdom)	Julian Thomson
2022	2022/03/04	Stable release	Jaguar Vision Gran Turismo Roadster	(United Kingdom)	Julian Thomson
2022	2022/03/04	Stable release	Porsche Vision Gran Turismo	(Germany)	Peter Varga
2022	2022/05/26	1.15	Suzuki Vision Gran Turismo	(Japan)	Antonio Nozza
2022	2022/06/23	1.17	Suzuki Vision Gran Turismo (Gr. 3)	(Japan)	Antonio Nozza
2022	2022/09/29	1.23	Porsche Vision Gran Turismo Spyder	(Germany)	Peter Varga
2022	2022/12/15	1.27	Ferrari Vision Gran Turismo	(Italy)	Flavio Manzoni
2023	2023/02/21	1.29	Italdesign Exeneo Vision Gran Turismo (Street Mode)	(Italy)	Carsten Monnerjan
2023	2023/02/21	1.29	Italdesign Exeneo Vision Gran Turismo (Off-Road Mode)	(Italy)	Carsten Monnerjan
2024	2024/01/24	1.42	Genesis X Gran Berlinetta Vision Gran Turismo	(South Korea)	Tony Chen
2024	2024/01/24	1.42	Bulgari Aluminium Vision Gran Turismo	(Italy)	Fabrizio Buonamassa Stigliani
2024	2024/04/24	1.46	Škoda Vision Gran Turismo	(Czech Republic)	Oliver Stefani
2024	2024/07/25	1.49	Genesis X Gran Racer Vision Gran Turismo	(South Korea)	Tony Chen
2025	2025/08/28	1.62	Chevrolet Corvette CX.R Vision Gran Turismo	(United States)	Vlad Kapitonov
2025	2025/09/23	1.63	Opel Corsa GSE Vision Gran Turismo	(Germany)	Mark Adams
2026	2026/10/15	1.72	Xiaomi Vision Gran Turismo	(China)	Sawyer Li

== Confirmed participants with no entries ==
- Ford
- Jordan
- Nike
- Tesla

Alfa Romeo and Bertone had previously been listed as participants in Vision Gran Turismo at launch. Alfa Romeo intended to introduce a Vision Gran Turismo car of their own, referred to as the Alfa Romeo 6C Biposto. However, for reasons yet unknown, Alfa Romeo abandoned the project and was quietly delisted from Vision Gran Turismo sometime in 2014. Bertone also revealed plans for their unnamed Vision Gran Turismo car, hinted to have an unconventional three-wheeler-like shape and a highly futuristic design. Later in 2014, Bertone filed for bankruptcy, with the car never having been incorporated into GT6.

== Recognition ==
On 23 January 2016, the Japan Car Design Awards ceremony (hosted by Car Styling) was held in Minato, Tokyo, where Gran Turismo received the Golden Marker Special Award in recognition of the contribution made with the Vision Gran Turismo project. The trophy was presented by a collection of journalists and car designers.
