= Mazda RX-Vision =

Concept car produced by Mazda

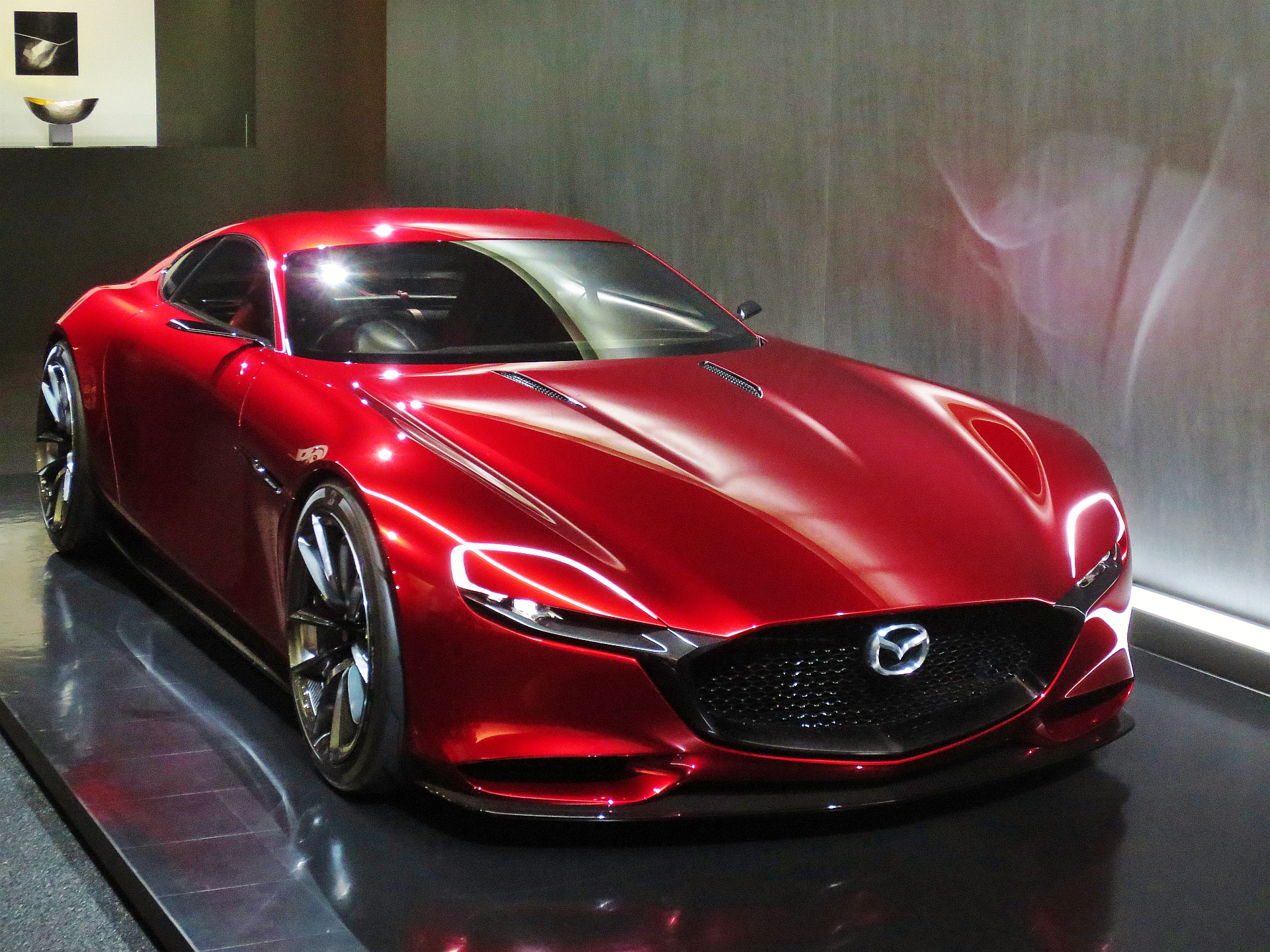

Overview
- Manufacturer: Mazda
- Production: 2015

Body and chassis
- Class: Concept car
- Body style: 2-door coupé
- Layout: FR layout

Powertrain
- Engine: 2.6 L SKYACTIV-R naturally aspirated four-rotor rotary (GT3 digital version)
- Transmission: 6-speed SKYACTIV-MT manual (GT3 digital version)

Dimensions
- Wheelbase: 2,700 mm (106.3 in)
- Length: 4,389 mm (172.8 in)
- Width: 1,925 mm (75.8 in)
- Height: 1,160 mm (45.7 in)

The Mazda RX-Vision is a concept sports car produced by the Japanese car manufacturer Mazda, presented in 2015.

== Presentation ==
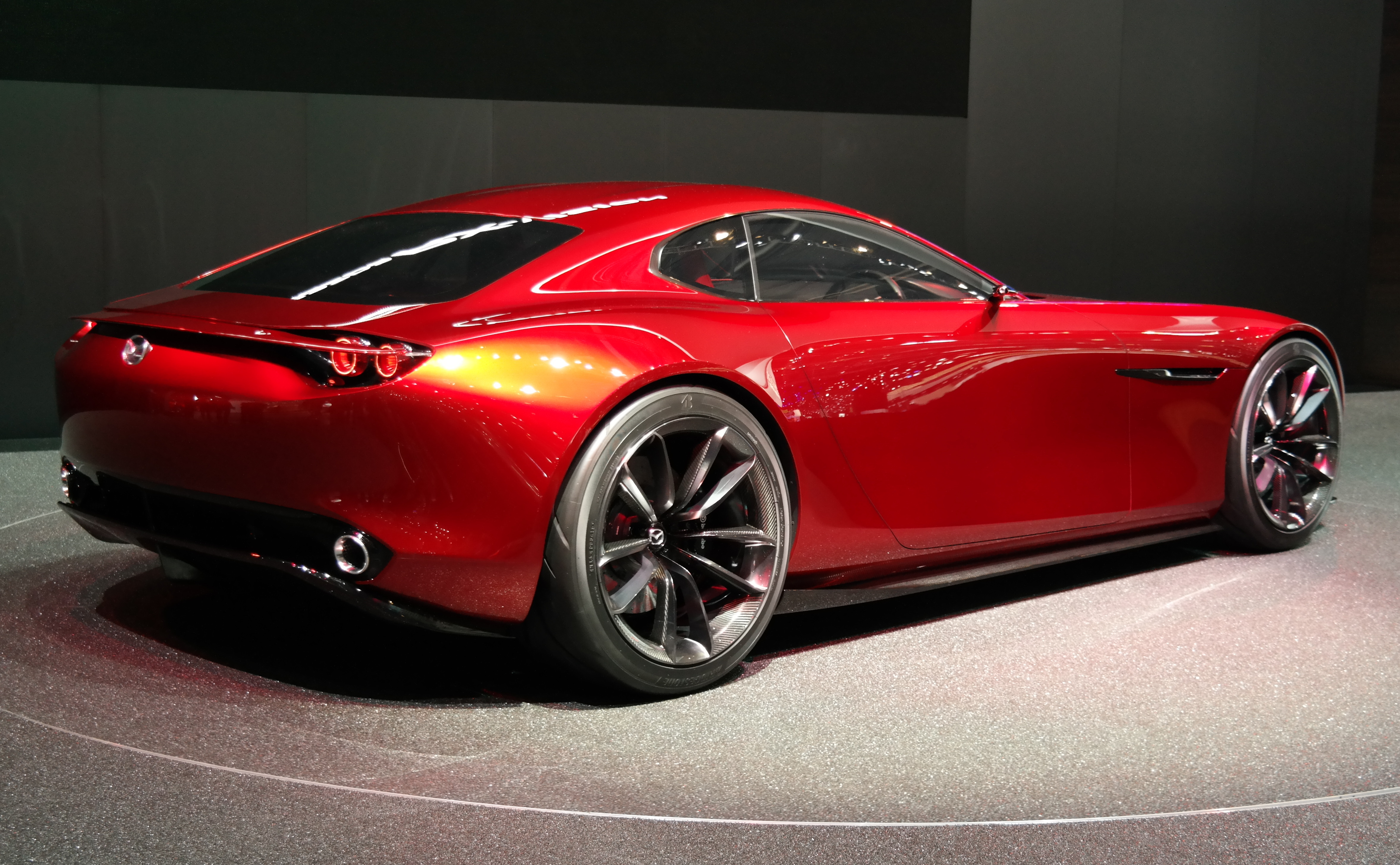
Rear 3/4 view

The RX-Vision was presented at the Tokyo Motor Show in October 2015. A racing version of the car, the Mazda RX-Vision GT3 Concept, was announced at the 2019 FIA Gran Turismo Championship World Finals. Designed for the Group GT3 regulations and for the Gran Turismo Sport video game, the car became available on the game in May 2020.

Mazda and Polyphony Digital revealed an updated "Evo" version of the racing car in August 2026 that featured revisions similar to those of real GT3 Evo models. This will be made available in Gran Turismo 7 during 2026.

== Specifications ==
The RX-Vision uses Skyactiv-R technology, to improve reliability and lower fuel consumption by reducing the weight of the parts. At the design level, the KODO philosophy (the soul of movement) has been applied. Although it is not specified how many rotors the original concept car has, the RX-Vision GT3 Concept is stated to use a four-rotor engine.

== Awards ==
The Mazda RX-Vision concept was voted "Most Beautiful Concept Car" at the International Automobile Festival in Paris in 2016.
