= List of Lamborghini automobiles =

The following is a list of production automobiles manufactured by Lamborghini, listed in chronological order. Only the main models are listed; sub-models (e.g. limited edition variants, roadster variants, etc.) are included with ”numbers produced”.

== Current production vehicles ==
Model	Duration of production	Numbers produced	Engine	Top speed	Image
Urus	2018–present	SUV: In production	Urus: V8 4.0-litre twin turbo Urus SE: V8 4.0-litre twin turbo with electric motor	305 km/h (190 mph)	
Revuelto	2023–present	Coupe: In production	V12 6.5-litre with 3 electric motors	350 km/h (217 mph)	
Temerario	2025–present	Coupe: In production	V8 4.0-litre twin turbo with 3 electric motors	343 km/h (213 mph)	

== Former production vehicles ==
Model	Duration of production	Numbers produced	Engine	Top speed	Image
350 GT	1964–1966	118 GTS: 2 3500 GTZ: 2	V12 3,464 cc	254 km/h (158 mph)	
400 GT	1966–1968	23 GT 2+2: 250 GT Flying Star II: 1 GT Monza: 1	V12 3,929 cc	249 km/h (155 mph)	
Miura	1966–1972	P400: 275 P400 S: 338 P400 SV: 150 Roadster: 1 Jota: 1	V12 3,929 cc	290 km/h (180 mph) S: 276 km/h (171 mph)	
Espada	1968–1978	Prototype: 1 Series I: 186 Series II: 575 Series III: 465	V12 3,929 cc	245 km/h (152 mph)	
Islero	1968–1969	125; S: 100	V12 3,929 cc	248 km/h (154 mph); S: 259 km/h (161 mph)	
Jarama	1970–1976	400 GT: 177 400 GTS: 150 400 GT 'Bob': 1	V12 3,929 cc	240 km/h (149 mph)	
Urraco	1973–1979	Prototype: 2 P250: 520 P300: 190 P200: 66 'Bob': 1	V8 2.0-litre (122 cid); V8 2.5-litre (153 cid); V8 3.0-litre (183 cid)	230 km/h (143 mph)	
Countach	1974–1990	LP500 Prototype: 1 LP400: 157; LP400S: 237; LP500S: 321; LP5000 QV: 610; 25th Anniversary: 650 Evoluzione: 1 "Alfieri": 1	V12 4.0-litre (240 cid); V12 5.0-litre (290 cid); V12 5.2-litre (320 cid)	254 km/h (158 mph)–299 km/h (186 mph)	
Silhouette	1976–1979	55	V8 3.0-litre (182.8 cid)	260 km/h (162 mph)	
Jalpa	1981–1988	P350: 410 Spyder: 2	V8 3.5-litre (213 cid)	249 km/h (155 mph)	
LM002	1986–1993	328	V12 5.17-litre (315 cid)	210 km/h (130 mph)	
Diablo	1990–2001	900 VT Mk1: 400 SE30: 135 SE30 Jota: 15 VT Mk1 Roadster: 200 SV Mk1: unknown VS Special: 1 SV Mk1 Roadster: 6 SV Mk1 Monterey Edition: 20 Alpine Edition: 12 VT Mk2: unknown SV Mk2: 100 VT Mk2 Roadster: 100 GT: 83 VT Mk2 Roadster Momo Edition: 12 GTR: 32 Millennium Roadster: 30 VT Mk2 6.0: 337 VT MK2 6.0 SE: 44	V12 5.7-litre (350 cid); V12 6.0-litre (370 cid)	330 km/h (205 mph)	
Murciélago	2001–2010	3084 40th Anniversary: 50 Concept: 1 Roadster: 899 LP640-4: LP640-4 Roadster: 186 LP670-4 Super Veloce: 186 LP670-4 SV China Edition: 10	V12 6.2-litre (380 cid); V12 6.5-litre (400 cid)	330 km/h (205 mph)–341 km/h (212 mph)	
Gallardo	2003–2013	7221 Spyder: 3353 SE: 250 Nera: 185 LP550-2 Valentino Balboni: 250 LP570-4 Super Trofeo Stradale: 150 Squadra Corse: 50	V10 5.0-litre (303 cid); V10 5.2-litre (317 cid)	309 km/h (192 mph)–325 km/h (202 mph)	
Aventador	2011–2022	J: 1; LP700-4:5000; LP700-4 Roadster: 1075; LP720-4 50th Anniversario Coupe: 100; LP720-4 50th Anniversario Roadster: 100; LP740-4 S: LP740-4 S Roadster: LP750-4 SV: 600; LP750-4 SV Roadster: 500; LP770-4 SVJ: 963; LP770-4 SVJ Roadster: 863; LP780-4 Ultimae: 350; LP780-4 Ultimae Roadster:	V12 6.5-litre (397 cid) (New L539)	349 km/h (217 mph)	
Huracán	2014–2024	LP610-4 Coupe: 6000-7000; LP610-4 Spyder: 2500-3500; LP580-2 Coupe: 2500-3500; LP580-2 Spyder: 1000-1500; Peformante Coupe: 2000-3000; Peformante Spyder: 800-1200; Evo Coupe: 2500-3500; Evo Spyder: 1000-1500; Evo RWD Coupe: 3000-4000; Evo RWD Spyder: 1500-2500; Tecnica: 2500-3500; STO: 2500-3500; Sterrato: 1499; STJ: 10	V10 5.2-litre odd-firing	325 km/h (202 mph)	

== One-off and limited production vehicles ==
Model	Duration of production	Numbers produced	Engine	Top speed	Image
Reventón	2008–2010	Coupe: 20+1 for museum Roadster: 15	V12 6.5-litre (400 cid)	330 km/h (205 mph)	
Sesto Elemento	2012	20	V10 5.2-litre (317 cid)	355 km/h (221 mph)	
Veneno	2013–2014	Prototype: 2 (1 for show, 1 for test); Coupe: 3 Roadster: 9	V12 6.5-litre (397 cid)	356 km/h (221 mph)	
Centenario	2016–2017	Coupe: 20 Roadster: 20	V12 6.5-litre	349 km/h (217 mph)	The Centenario is a limited edition Lamborghini commemorating the 100th birthday of Automobili Lamorghini's founder Ferruccio Lamborghini. The 40 planned production models were sold ahead of the cars debut at Geneva this year.
SC18 Alston	2018	1	V12 6.5-litre		
Sián FKP 37	2020	Coupe: 63; Roadster: 19	V12 6.5-litre and a supercapacitor hybrid system	349 km/h (217 mph)	
Essenza SCV12	2020	40	V12 6.5-litre		
SC20 Alston	2021	1	V12 6.5-litre		
Countach LPI 800-4	2022	112	V12 6.5-litre	355 km/h (221 mph)	
Invencible	2023	1	V12 6.5-litre		
Auténtica	2023	1	V12 6.5-litre		
Fenomeno	2025	29	V12 6.5-litre	350 km/h (217 mph)	

== See also ==
- List of Lamborghini concept vehicles
