= Dog-leg gearbox =

Manual transmission shift pattern

A dog-leg gearbox or dogleg gearbox is a manual transmission shift pattern distinguished by an up-over-up shift between first and second gear. The layout derives its name from a dog's hind leg, with its sharp angles. Dog leg gearboxes were replaced in most mass production vehicles by transmissions with a standard gear layout. Most modern manual performance cars have six-speed gearboxes, which are unsuited to the dog-leg layout.

Dog leg five-speed layout	Conventional five-speed layout

== Automobiles ==
Dog-leg layout gearboxes were a reinterpretation of the classic 5-speed gate pattern: as in road racing more frequent shifting occurs from second to third than from first to second gear, the dog-leg gearbox puts 2nd and 3rd gear opposed one to the other, for a very quick up-shifting or down-shifting. This could bring the driver a great speed range with only one shift, which was particularly suitable for hillclimbing. They were transferred to sports cars in the 60s as a desirable feature. With the introduction of 6-speed manual gearboxes in the mid-90s and automated manual transmissions a few years later, dog leg gearboxes started to fall out of use.

Examples of cars that have used this pattern for performance reasons include Alfa Romeo Montreal and Alfa 6 (all models 1979/1987), BMW M535, early 635CSi (non-US) and (non-US) M3 E30, BMW 2002 Tii and Turbo, Mercedes-Benz 190E 2.3-16 and 2.5-16, Mercedes-Benz 300 CE-24, Mercedes-Benz CW311, most Ferraris from 60s to mid 90s (last ones being Ferrari 348 and Ferrari F512M), Dino 206/246 GT and cars featuring its engine and ZF transmission combo (Lancia Stratos and Fiat Dino -only 2.4 version-), the 60s Ford GT40 with a ZF transaxle, early Porsche 911 and 5-speed 912, Porsche 914 and 914/6, Porsche 924 (optional in 1978 and 79, standard in 1979 and 1980 Turbo variant), 928 and 959 (all featuring Getrag gearboxes), Cosworth Vega, Talbot Sunbeam Lotus, later model Jensen-Healey, Vauxhall Firenza HPF, Vauxhall Chevette HS and HSR, Lancia Fulvia, many classic Lamborghinis (including Countach, Urraco/Silhouette/Jalpa and Diablo), Maserati Biturbo, De Tomaso Pantera, and Aston Martin V12 Vantage. Rather unusually, the Prince Skyline 2000GT-B uses a true double dog-leg transmission pattern for its four speed gearbox, as first gear is in the traditional dog-leg location, while fourth is to the left of third gear.

Despite the performance benefits, non-performance-oriented cars available with the dog-leg shift pattern were produced. Examples include the Ford Model A, Subaru 360, Datsun 140Y (Datsun Sunny B310 Coupe), Datsun 160J Hardtop SSS, 74–77 Datsun 610 SSS, 78–80 Datsun 200sx, 1980 Datsun 210 Wagon (built during the 210/310 crossover), 78–80 Datsun 510, Citroën 2CV, Mercedes 190, Mercedes-Benz 200D, Mercedes-Benz 300CE, Mercedes-Benz 320CE, Mercedes-Benz E320 sedan -94, Mercedes-Benz 300SL (R129), and the 1976–77 Oldsmobile Cutlass or Pontiac LeMans with the 260 V8, the 76–77 Chevrolet Vega or Pontiac Astre, 76–79 Chevrolet Monza or Buick Skyhawk or Oldsmobile Starfire, BMW E21, the 77–79 Pontiac Sunbird and TATA Sierra in India. The early model Renault 4 had a distinctive 'umbrella handle' dog-leg shift, which proved ideal for urban driving, though the shift was later changed to the 'conventional' pattern.

== Trucks ==
Many light trucks (e.g. Iveco Turbo Daily) have dog-leg five- or six-speed transmissions, because second gear is fine for normal starting; first is considered a "crawler" or "granny" gear in these trucks and is only used for starting with heavy loads and/or a trailer, or descending steep grades. In many older trucks, the shifter is marked with "Low" instead of "1", and 2nd gear is marked as 1st instead. A 4-speed truck gearshift might read "R, Low, 1, 2, 3", rather than "R, 1, 2, 3, 4", since the transmission is considered a 3-speed with an auxiliary low gear rather than a normal 4 speed.

The dog leg gearbox is typical of nine- and ten-speed heavy-truck transmissions. In the case of a ten-speed transmission, the gears are 1–5 in the low range and 6–10 in the high range (the 1 position is not used in the high range of a nine-speed transmission).
