= Lamborghini Miura =

Sports car

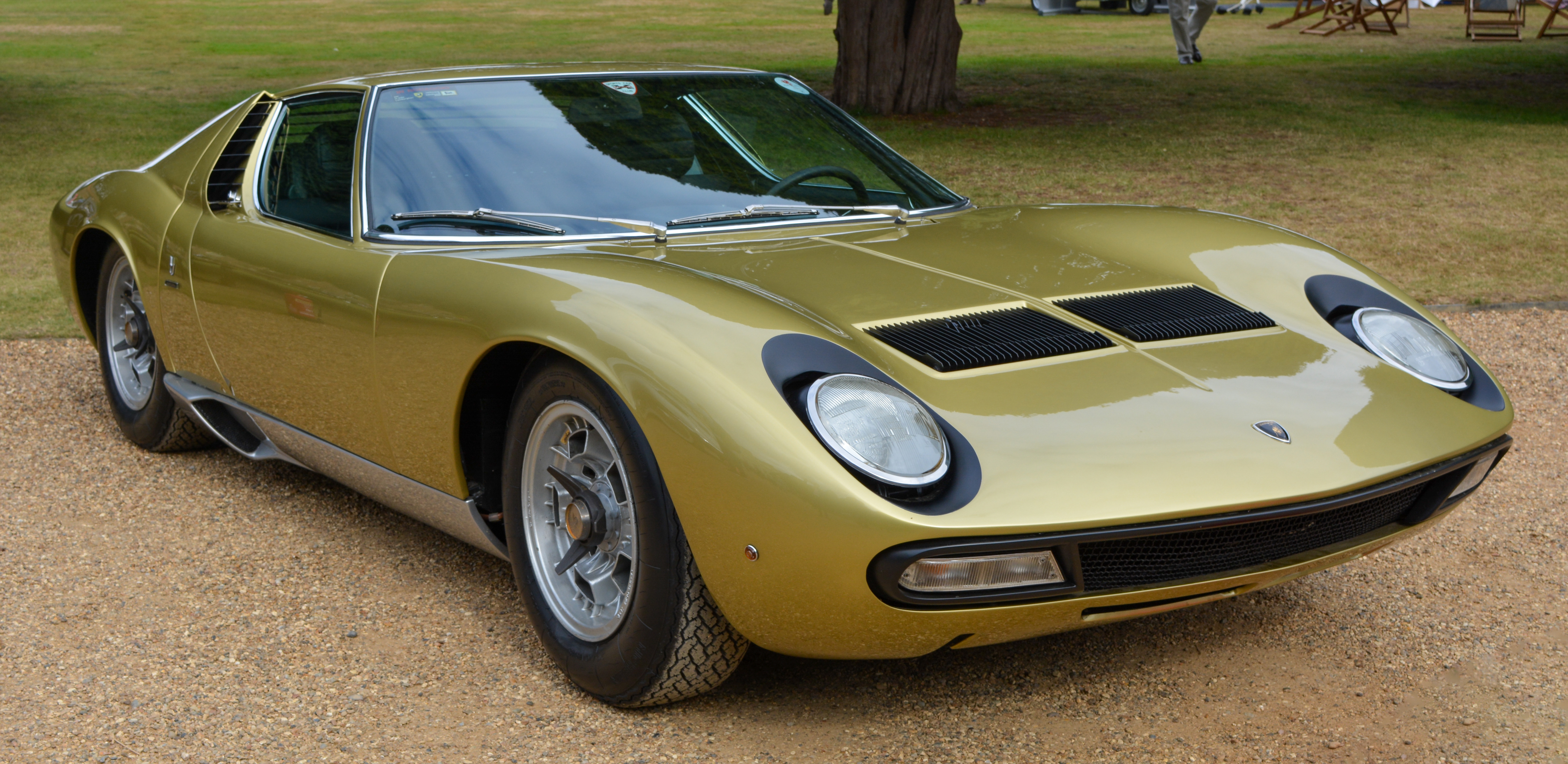
- 1971 Lamborghini Miura P400 SV

Overview
- Manufacturer: Automobili Lamborghini S.p.A.
- Production: 1966–1973; 764 made
- Assembly: Italy: Sant'Agata Bolognese
- Designer: Marcello Gandini at Bertone

Body and chassis
- Class: Sports car (S)
- Body style: 2-door coupé
- Layout: Transverse rear mid-engine, rear-wheel-drive

Powertrain
- Engine: 3,929 cc (3.9 L) L406 V12
- Transmission: 5-speed manual

Dimensions
- Wheelbase: 2,500 mm (98.4 in)
- Length: 4,360 mm (171.7 in)
- Width: 1,760 mm (69.3 in)
- Height: 1,055 mm (41.5 in)
- Curb weight: 1,292 kg (2,848 lb)

Chronology
- Successor: Lamborghini Countach

The Lamborghini Miura is a sports car produced by Italian automaker Lamborghini between 1966 and 1973. The car was the first high-performance production road car with a rear mid-engine, rear-wheel-drive layout, which has since become the standard for performance-oriented sports cars. When released, it was the fastest production car in the world.

The Miura was originally conceived by Lamborghini's engineering team, which designed the car in its spare time against the wishes of company founder Ferruccio Lamborghini, who preferred powerful yet sedate grand touring cars over the race car-derived machines produced by local rival Ferrari. However, when the development mule was revealed to Ferruccio, he gave approval for its development to continue.

The Miura's rolling chassis was presented at the 1965 Turin Auto Show, and the prototype P400 debuted at the 1966 Geneva Motor Show. It received stellar receptions from showgoers and the motoring press alike, each impressed by Marcello Gandini's sleek styling and the car's revolutionary mid-engine design.

Lamborghini's flagship, the Miura received periodic updates and remained in production until 1973. A year later the Countach entered the company's lineup, amid tumultuous financial times for the company.

== Development ==
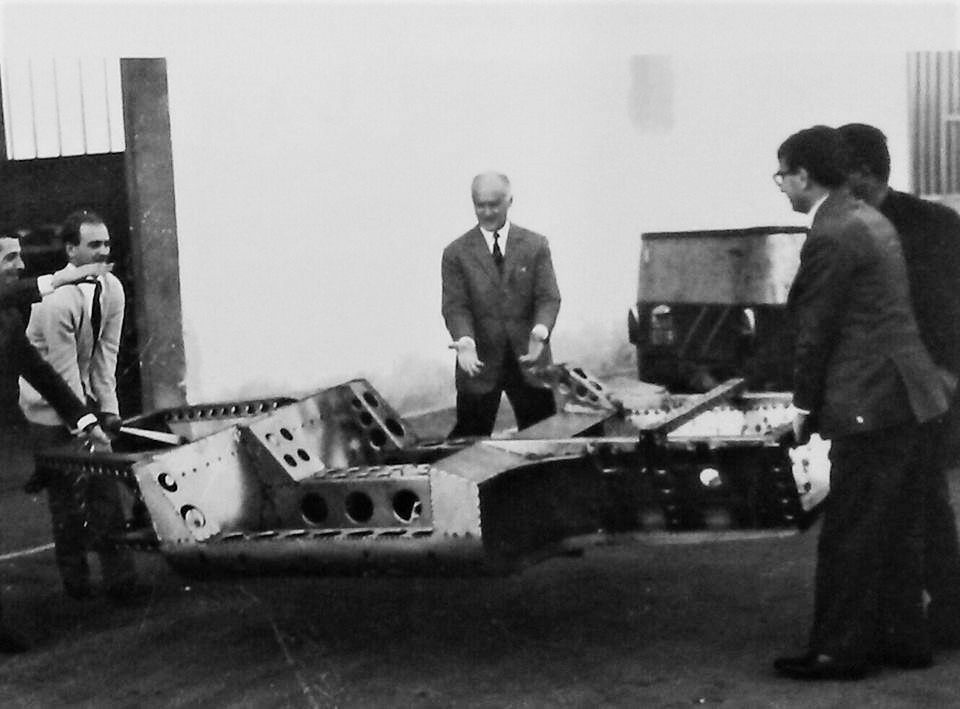
In the middle: Carlo Anderloni of Carrozzeria Touring, Milano. Also in picture are Lamborghini engineers Paolo Stanzani (left with light jacket) and Giampaolo Dallara (right, spectacles). The frame lifted was probably the one presented as a bodyless "rolling chassis" at Torino Auto Show which lasted November 3-11, 1965. With 4 wheels and the engine mounted.

During 1965, Lamborghini's three top engineers, Giampaolo Dallara, Paolo Stanzani and Bob Wallace put their own time into developing a prototype car known as the P400. The engineers envisioned a road car with racing pedigree, one which could win on the track and be driven on the road by enthusiasts. The three men worked on its design at night, hoping to convince company founder Ferruccio Lamborghini such a vehicle would neither be too expensive nor distract from the company's focus. When finally brought aboard, Lamborghini gave his engineers a free hand in the belief the P400 was a potentially valuable marketing tool, if nothing more.

The car featured a transversely-mounted mid-engine layout, a departure from previous Lamborghini cars. The V12 was also unusual in that it was effectively merged with the transmission and differential, reflecting a lack of space in the tightly wrapped design. The rolling chassis was displayed at the Turin Salon in 1965. Impressed showgoers placed orders for the car despite the lack of a body to go over the chassis.

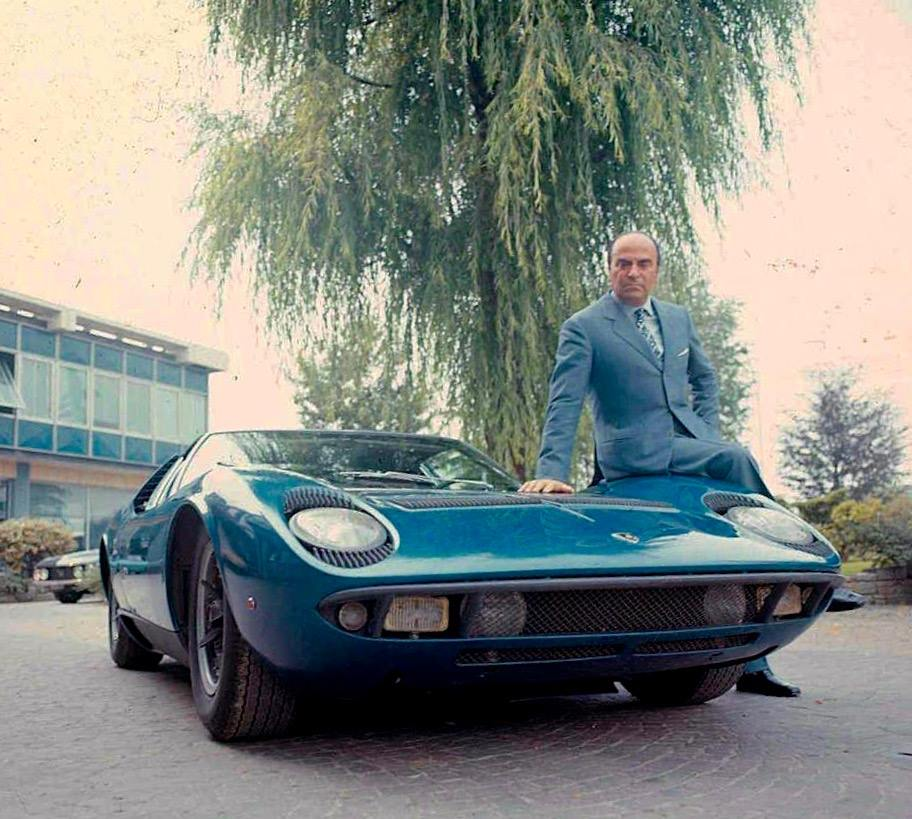
Nuccio Bertone sitting on a blue Miura.

Bertone was placed in charge of styling the prototype, which was finished just days before its debut at the 1966 Geneva Motor Show. None of the engineers had found time to check if the engine fit inside its compartment. Committed to showing the car, they decided to fill the engine bay with ballast and keep the hood locked throughout the show, as they had three years earlier for the début of the 350GTV. Sales head Ubaldo Sgarzi was forced to turn away members of the motoring press who wanted to see the P400's power plant. Despite this setback, the car was the highlight of the show, immediately boosting stylist Marcello Gandini's reputation.

The favourable reaction at Geneva meant the P400 was to go into production by the following year. The name "Miura", after the famous Spanish fighting bull breeder (pronounced [ˈmjuɾa]), was chosen and featured in the company's newly created badge. The car gained the worldwide attention of automotive enthusiasts when it was chosen for the opening sequence of the original 1969 version of The Italian Job.

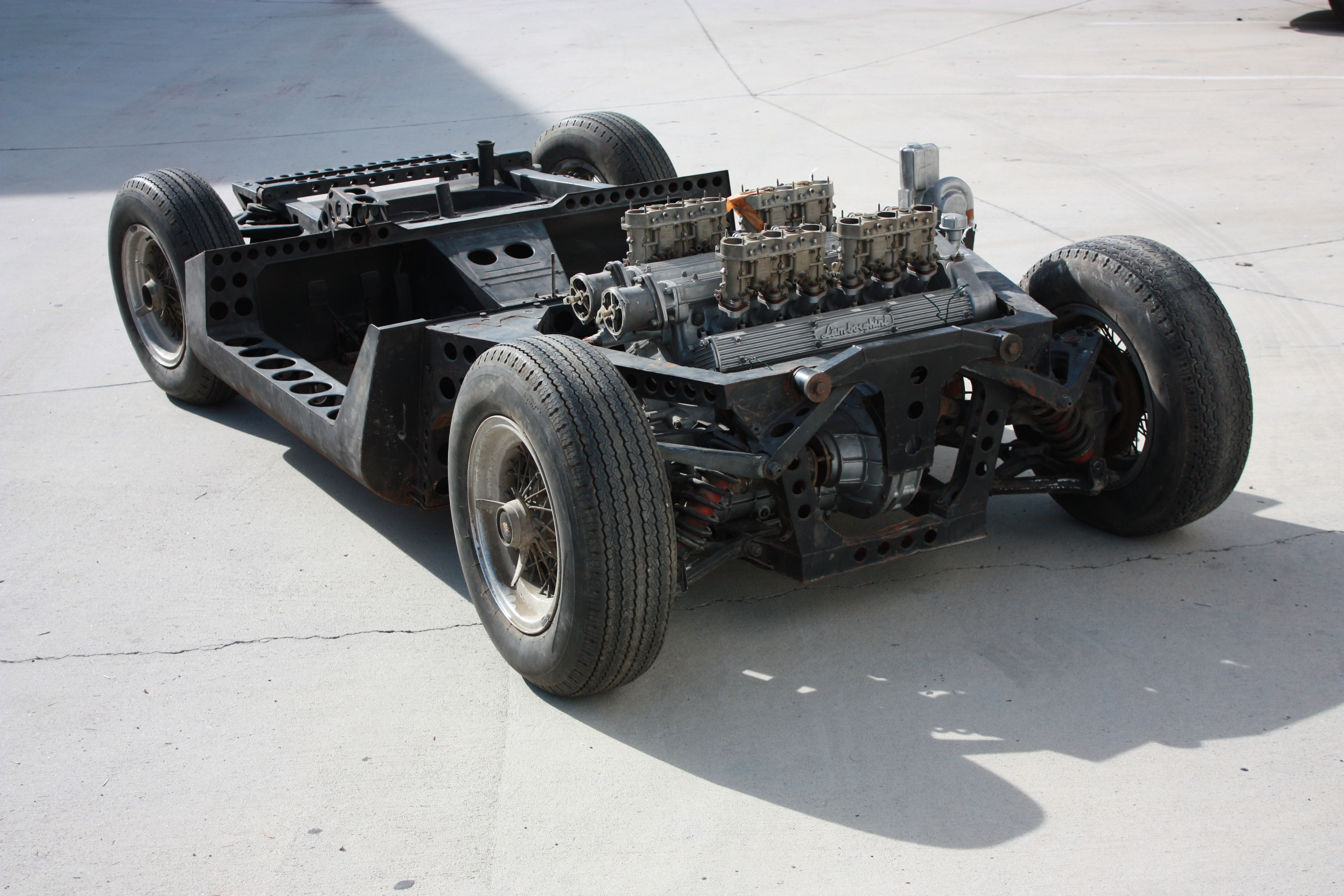
The prototype Miura chassis as it appeared at the 1966 Turin show

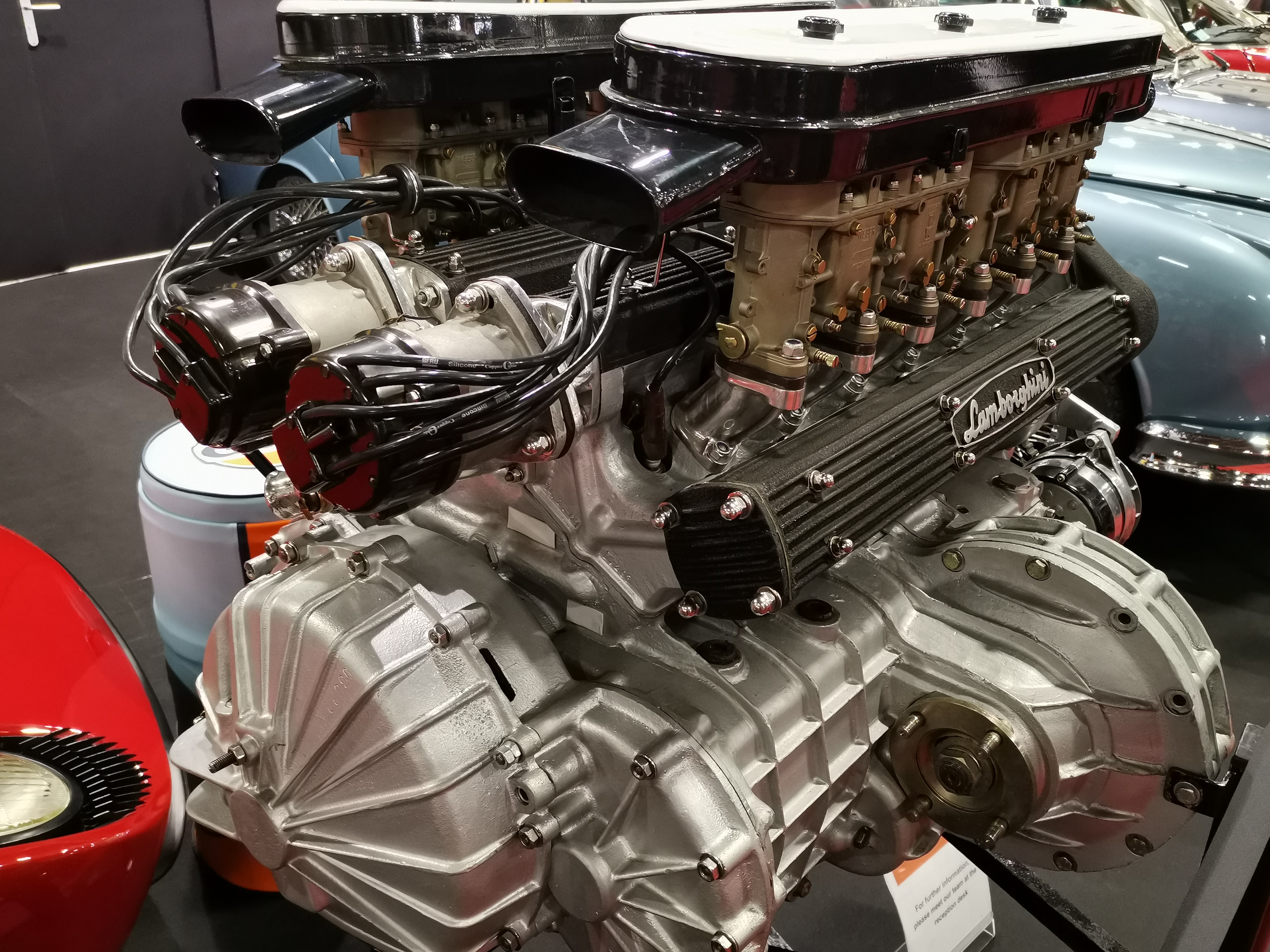
The V-12 engine and 5-speed transaxle

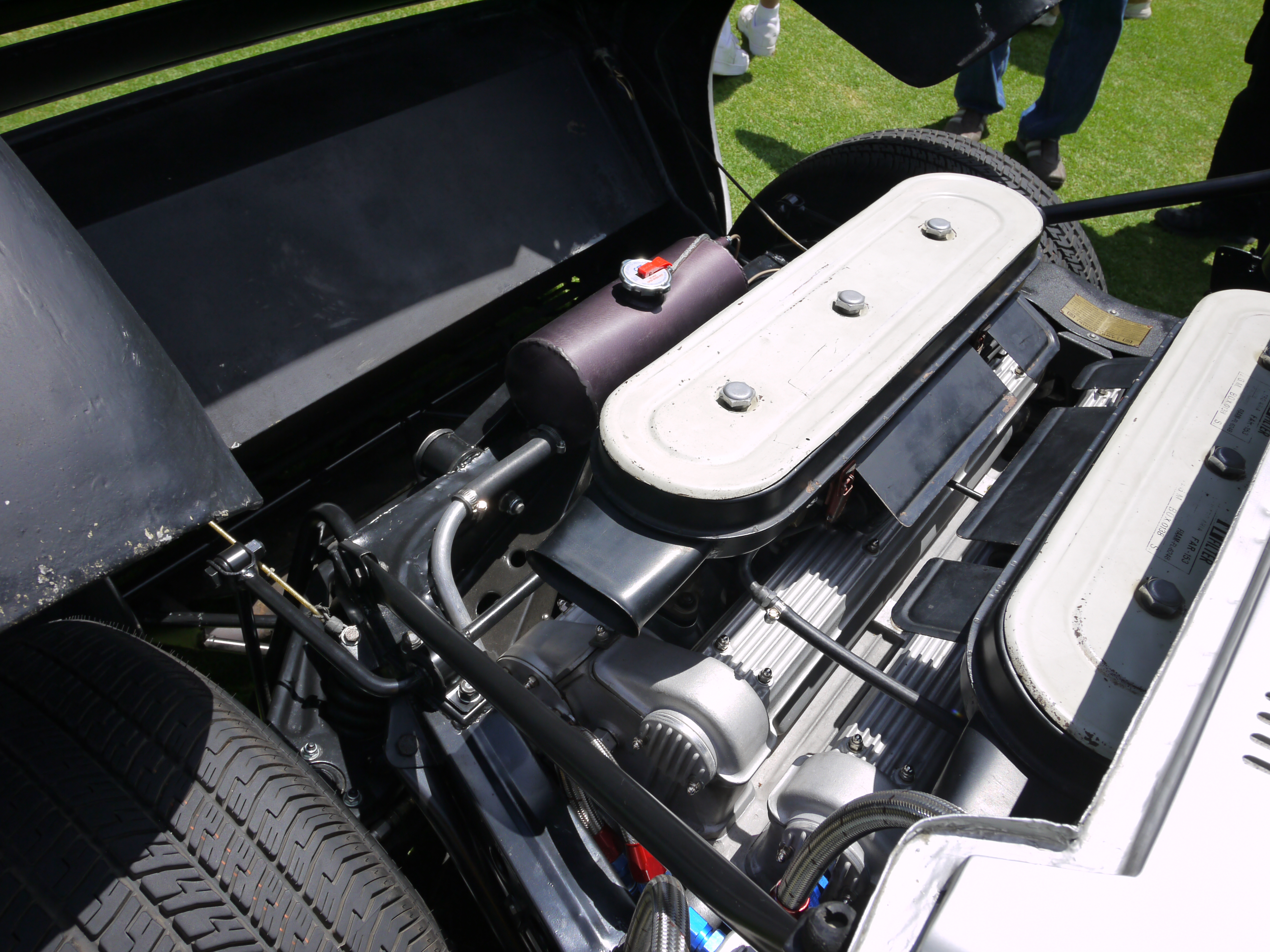
The engine bay, showing the transverse mounting of the engine ahead of the rear axle.

== Production history ==
=== P400 ===
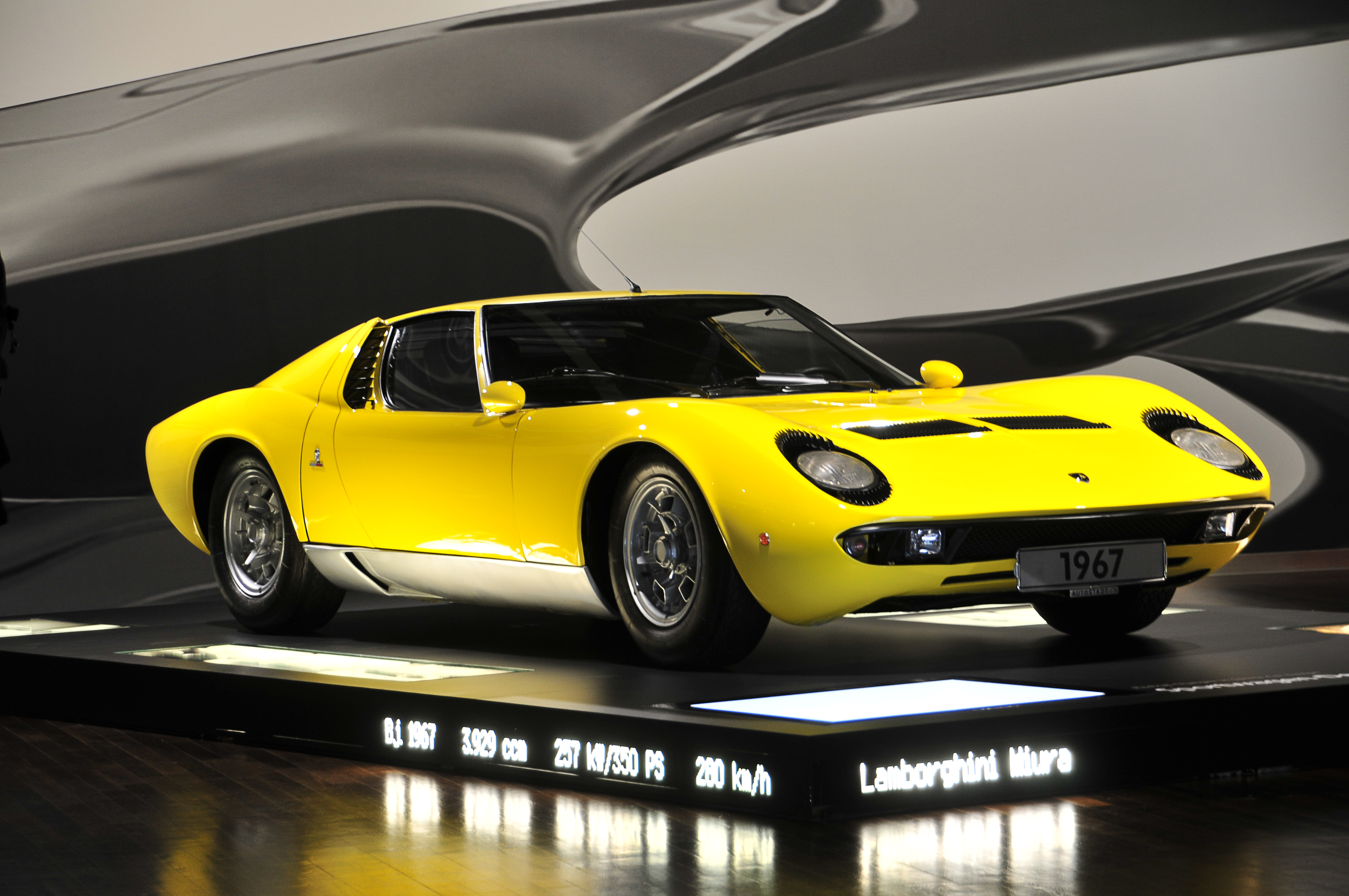
1967 Miura P400

The earliest model of the Miura was known as the P400 (for Posteriore 4 litri). It was powered by a version of the 3,929 cc (240 cu in) Lamborghini V12 engine used in the 400GT at the time. The engine was mounted transversely and produced 350 PS (257 kW; 345 hp). Exactly 275 P400s were produced between 1966 and 1969 – a success for Lamborghini despite its then-steep price of US$20,000 (equivalent to $198,462 in 2025).

Taking a cue from the Morris Mini, Lamborghini formed the engine and gearbox in one casting. Its shared lubrication continued until the last 96 SVs, when the case was split to allow the correct oils to be used for each element.

An unconfirmed claim holds the first 125 Miuras were built of 0.9 mm steel and are therefore lighter than later cars. All cars had steel frames and doors, with aluminium front and rear skinned body sections. When leaving the factory they were originally fitted with Pirelli Cinturato 205VR15 tyres (CN72).

==== Awards ====
The prototype version of the Miura won the prestigious Gran Turismo Trophy at the 2008 Pebble Beach Concours d'Elegance, and has been re-created for use in the Gran Turismo 5 sim racing video game.

=== P400S ===
The P400S Miura, also known as the Miura S, made its introduction at the Turin Motor Show in November 1968, where the original chassis had been introduced three years earlier. It was slightly revised from the P400, with the addition of power windows, bright chrome trim around external windows and headlights, new overhead inline console with new rocker switches, engine intake manifolds made 2 mm larger, different camshaft profiles, and notched trunk end panels (allowing for slightly more luggage space). The engine changes were reportedly good for an additional 20 PS (15 kW; 20 hp). The P400S had 215/70VR15 Pirelli Cinturato CN12 tyres on the front and 225/70VR15 CN12 tyres on the rear.

Other revisions were limited to creature comforts, such as a locking glovebox lid, a reversed position of the cigarette lighter and windshield wiper switch, and single release handles for front and rear body sections. Other interior improvements included the addition of power windows and optional air conditioning, available for US$800. About 338 P400S Miura were produced between December 1968 and March 1971. One S #4407 was owned by Frank Sinatra. Miles Davis also owned a Miura; in October 1972, he crashed it while attempting to turn off of the West Side Highway at 100 km/h (60 mph) while under the influence of cocaine, breaking both of his ankles and totaling the car. Eddie Van Halen can be heard revving the engine of his Miura on the Van Halen song "Panama".

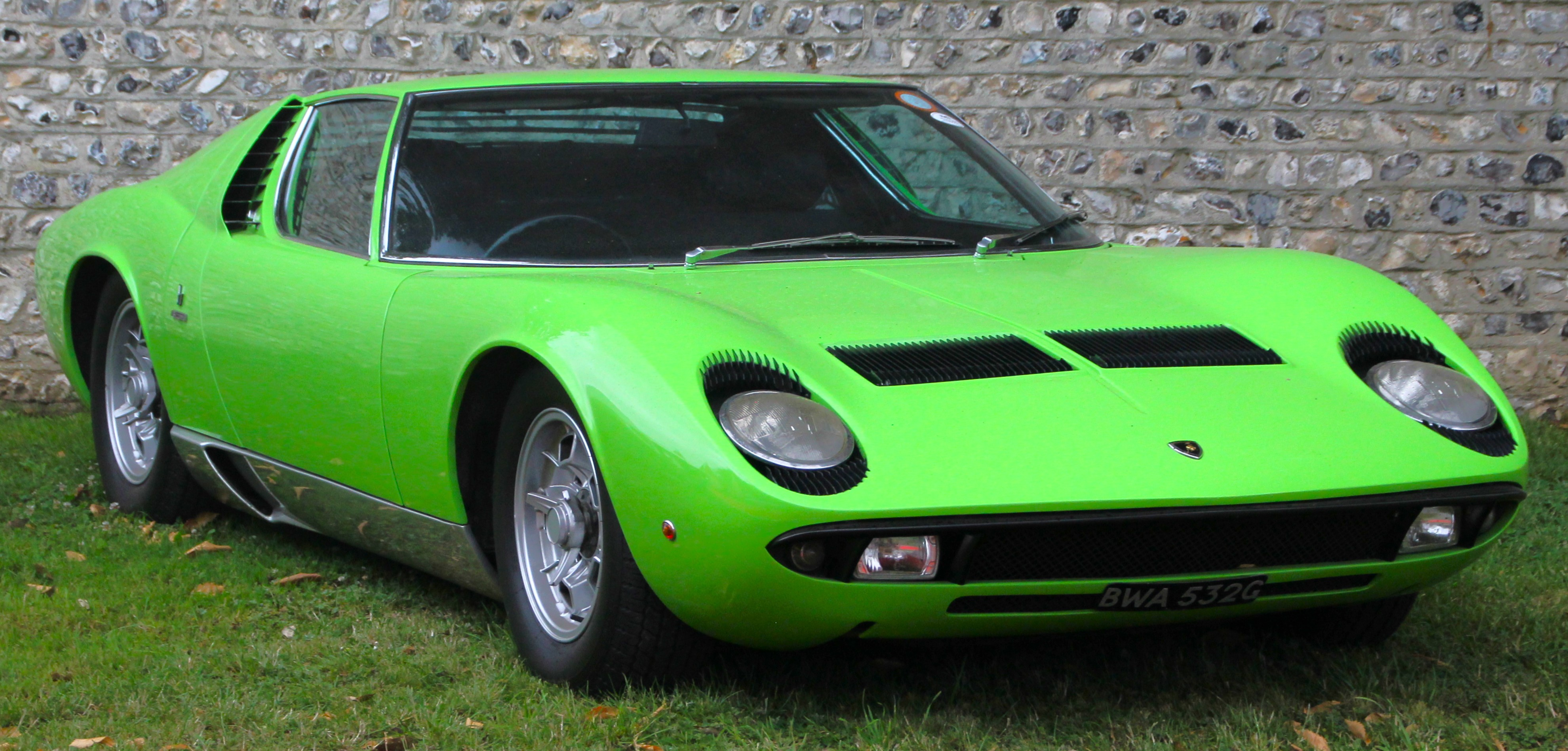
A 1968 Miura P400S

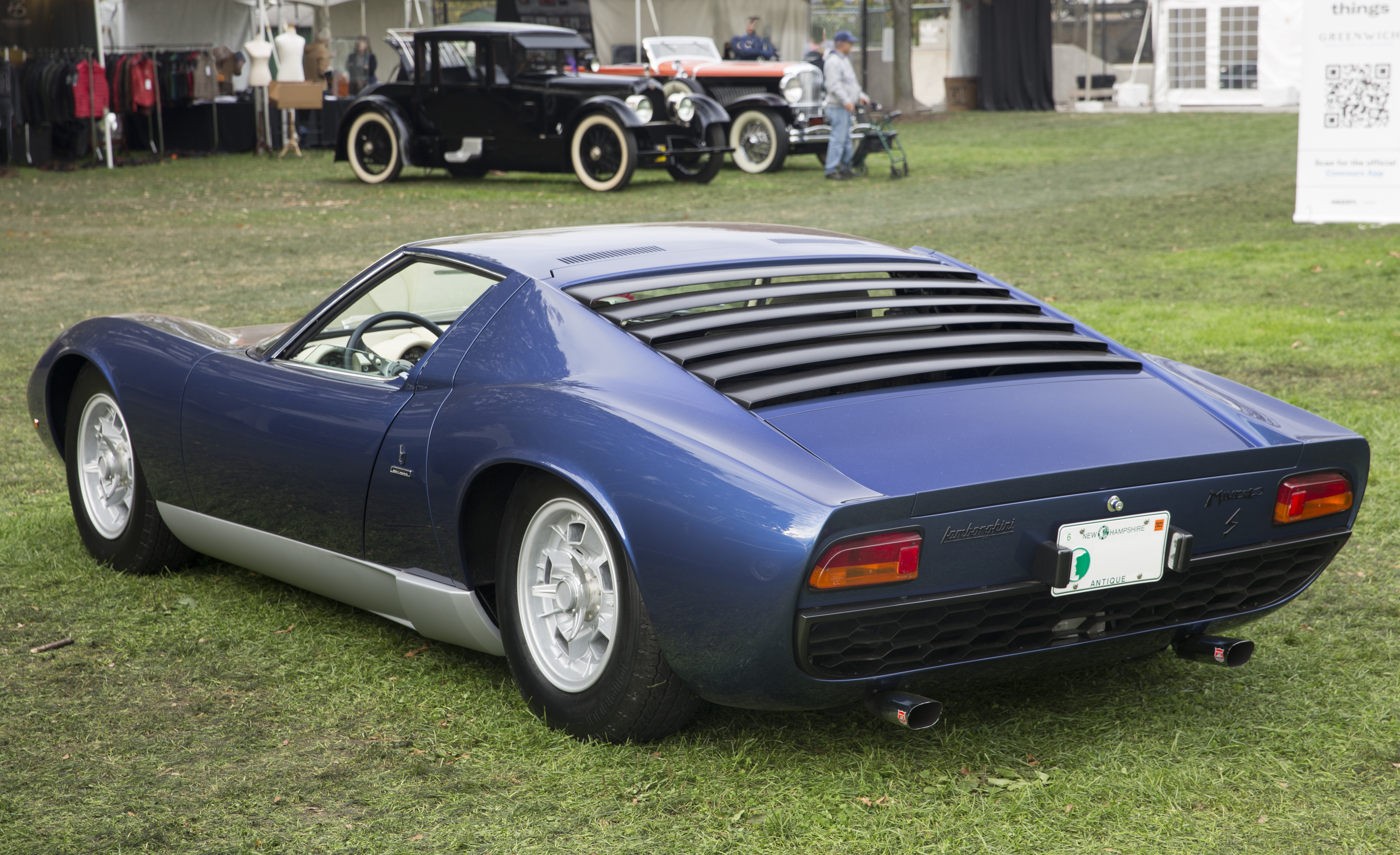
Rear view of a 1969 Miura P400 S

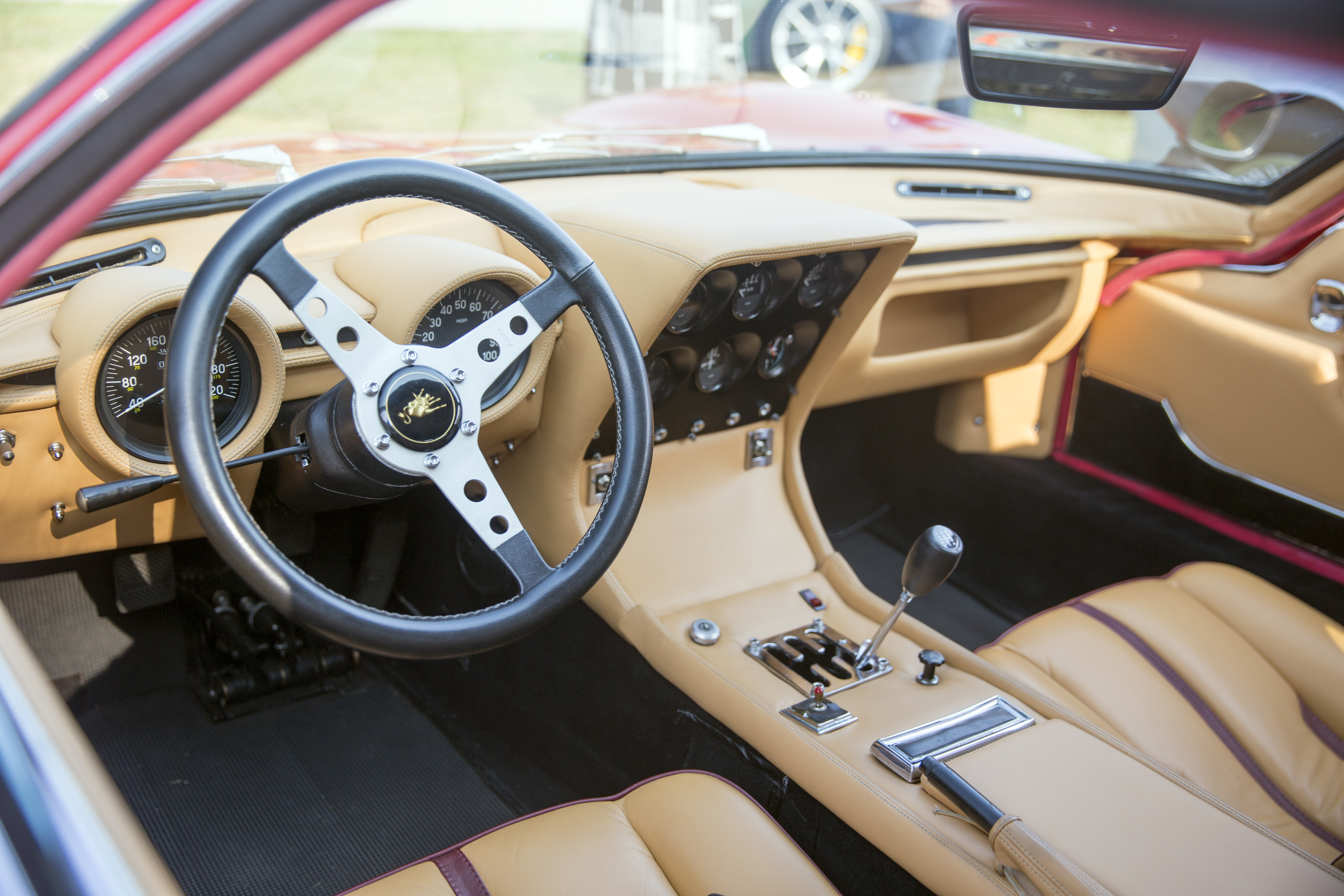
Interior

=== P400SV ===
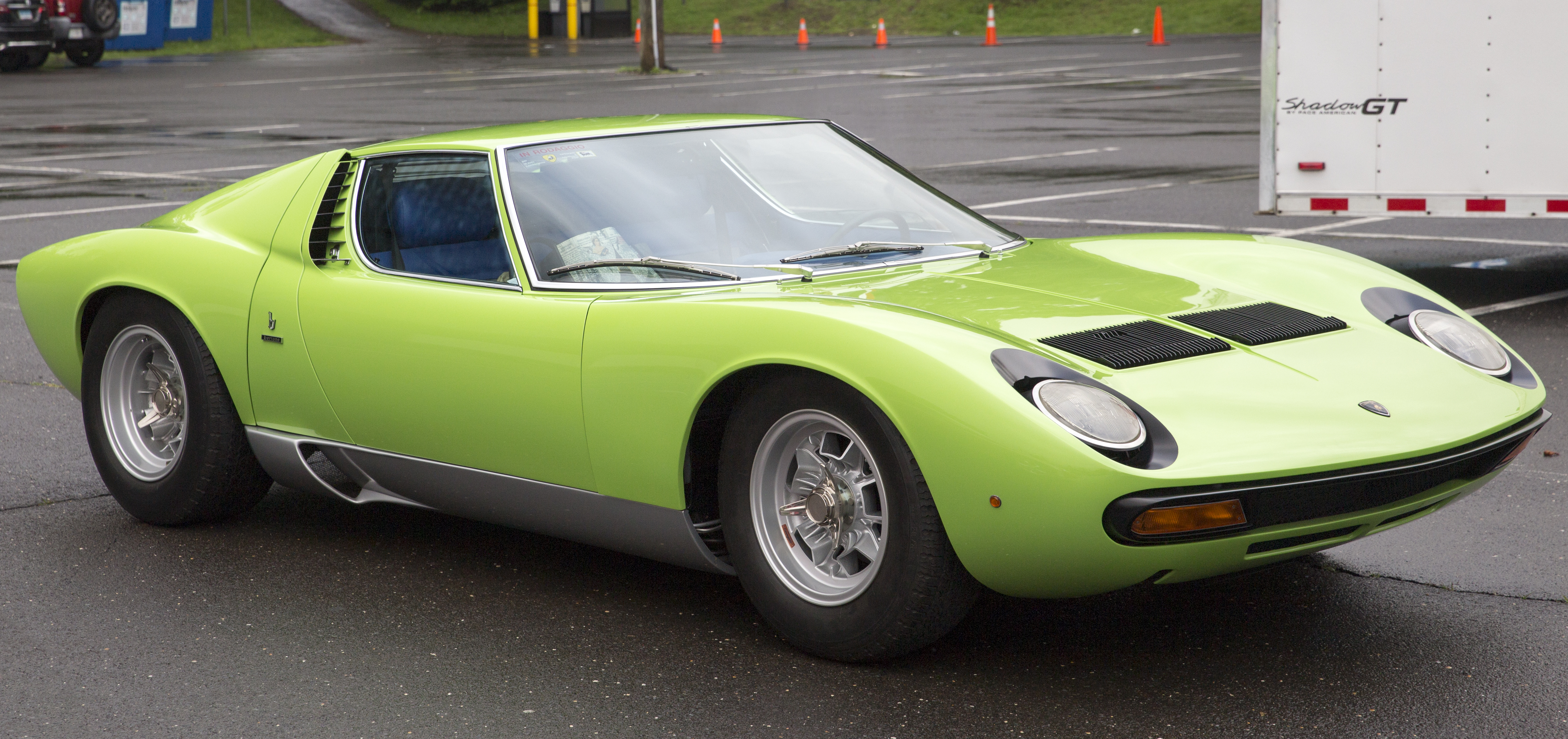
A Miura P400SV. Note the lack of "eyelashes" around the headlamps

The last and most famous Miura, the P400SV or Miura SV, was presented in 1971. It featured different cam timing and altered 4X3-barrel Weber carburetors. These gave the engine an additional 15 PS (11 kW), to 385 PS (283 kW; 380 hp) at 7,850 rpm and a maximum torque of 400 N⋅m (295 lb⋅ft) at 5,750 rpm. The last 96 SV engines had a split sump. The gearbox now had its lubrication system separate from the engine, which allowed the use of the appropriate types of oil for the gearbox and the engine. This also alleviated concerns that metal shavings from the gearbox could travel into the engine with disastrous and expensive results, and made the application of an optional limited-slip differential far easier. The SV can be distinguished from its predecessors by its lack of "eyelashes" around the headlamps, wider rear fenders to accommodate the new, 9-inch-wide (230 mm) rear wheels and different taillights. A total of 150 SVs were produced.

There was a misprint in the SV owners manual indicating bigger intake valves in English size (but correct size in metric). The intake and exhaust valves in all 4-litre Lamborghini V12 engines remained the same throughout all models. This intake size misprint carried forward into Espada 400GT and Countach LP 400/LP 400S owners manuals as well.

=== P400 Jota ===
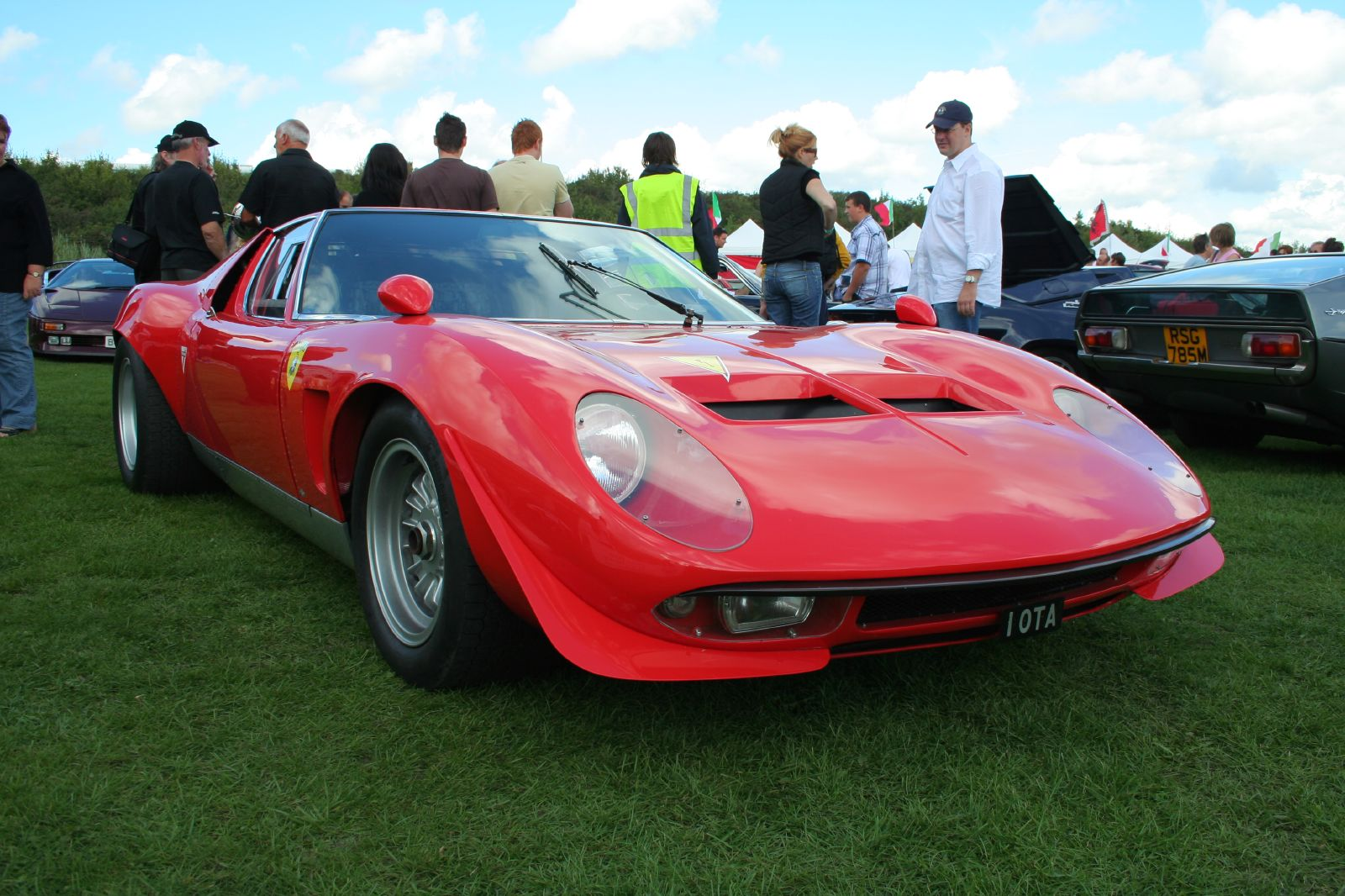
A recreation of the Miura P400 Jota

In 1970, Lamborghini development driver Bob Wallace created a test mule that would conform to the FIA's Appendix J racing regulations. The car was appropriately named the Miura Jota (the pronunciation of the letter 'J' in Spanish). Wallace made extensive modifications to the standard Miura chassis and engine. Weight reductions included replacing steel chassis components and body panels with the lightweight aluminium alloy Avional and replacing side windows with plastic, with the resulting car weighing approximately 800 lb (360 kg) less than a production Miura. A front spoiler was added and the headlights were replaced with fixed, faired-in units. Wallace substituted two smaller, sill-mounted fuel tanks for the single larger original unit. The suspension was reworked and the wheels widened (9" in the front, 12" in the rear), and lightweight wheels were fitted. The engine was modified to produce 418–440 bhp (312–328 kW) at 8800 rpm, with an increased compression ratio (from 10.4:1 to 11.5:1), altered cams, electronic ignition, dry-sump lubrication and a less restrictive exhaust system. This single example was eventually sold to a private buyer after extensive testing. In April 1971, the car crashed on the yet-unopened ring road around the city of Brescia, and burned to the ground.

It was once widely believed that the Jota had the chassis number of #5084 (a number well out of sequence for the date in question), it has been clarified by Miura expert Joe Sackey in his book The Lamborghini Miura Bible that this is not the case, and that #5084 is in fact a factory modified SV to SVJ spec.

After the Miura Jota had been destroyed, its original owner Walter Ronchi commissioned two former Lamborghini employees to build a P400S-based tribute car. This vehicle is known under the nickname "Millechiodi" and has been specially modified both inside and outside to match the specifications of the original Jota.

Another recreation of the Jota was later undertaken by Chris Lawrence of Wymondham Engineering for Lamborghini owner Piet Pulford from the United Kingdom on chassis #3033. Chassis #4280 is also known to be another Jota recreation based on a Miura S specification, receiving an SV engine stamped #30633 and a Jota conversion in Japan.

=== P400 SV/J ===
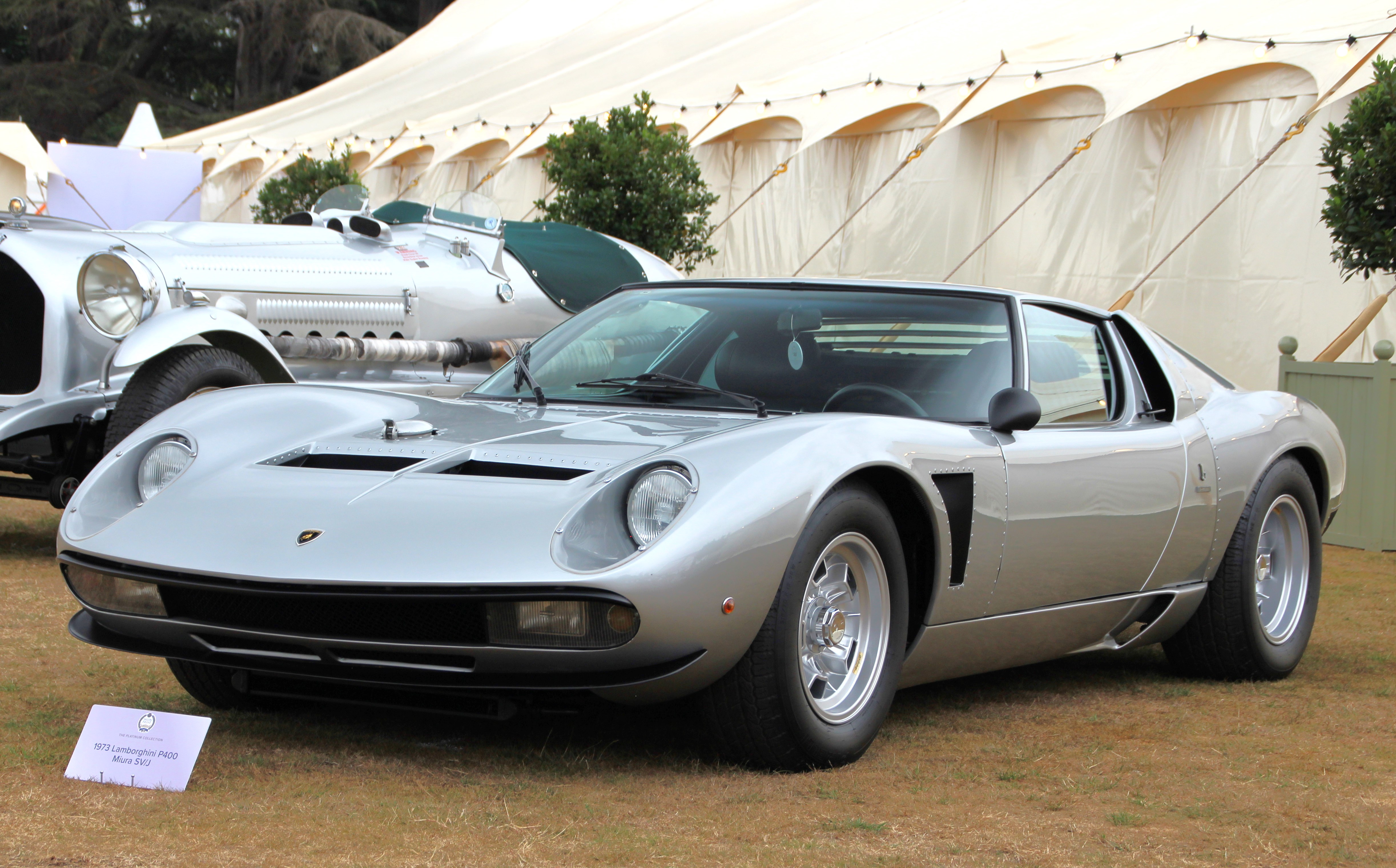
Miura SV/J (#4860)

There are six examples of the Miura SV/J known to be built by the factory while the Miura was still in production, one was built new (chassis #5090) and five were converted from existing SVs (chassis #4934, #4860, #4892, #4990 & #5084)

One of these cars, chassis #4934, was built for the Shah of Iran Mohammad Reza Pahlavi. The Shah stored this car under protection of armed guards along with another SV at the Royal Palace in Tehran. After he fled the country during the Iranian Revolution, his cars were seized by the Iranian government. The SV/J was sold to a collector in Dubai during 1995. In 1997 this car was sold in a Brooks auction to Nicolas Cage, at US$490,000, becoming the model's highest ever price at auction. Cage sold the car in 2002. Higher prices have been reached several times since then, including by SVJ #4892 selling for over $1.9M.

Of the six known original cars #4892 is a recent addition to the list of known genuine SVJ's with factory documentation now having come to light.

A seventh SV/J was built at the Lamborghini factory between 1983 and 1987 from an unused Miura S chassis. This was made for Jean Claude Mimran, one of the Mimran brothers, the then owner of Lamborghini. Most experts do not recognize this as an "official" SVJ due to it being converted (albeit done by the factory) long after the Miura went out of production.

Further Miuras were subsequently upgraded to SVJ specifications (trying to imitate the real factory SVJs) by various garages in Switzerland, the USA and Japan.

=== Roadster ===
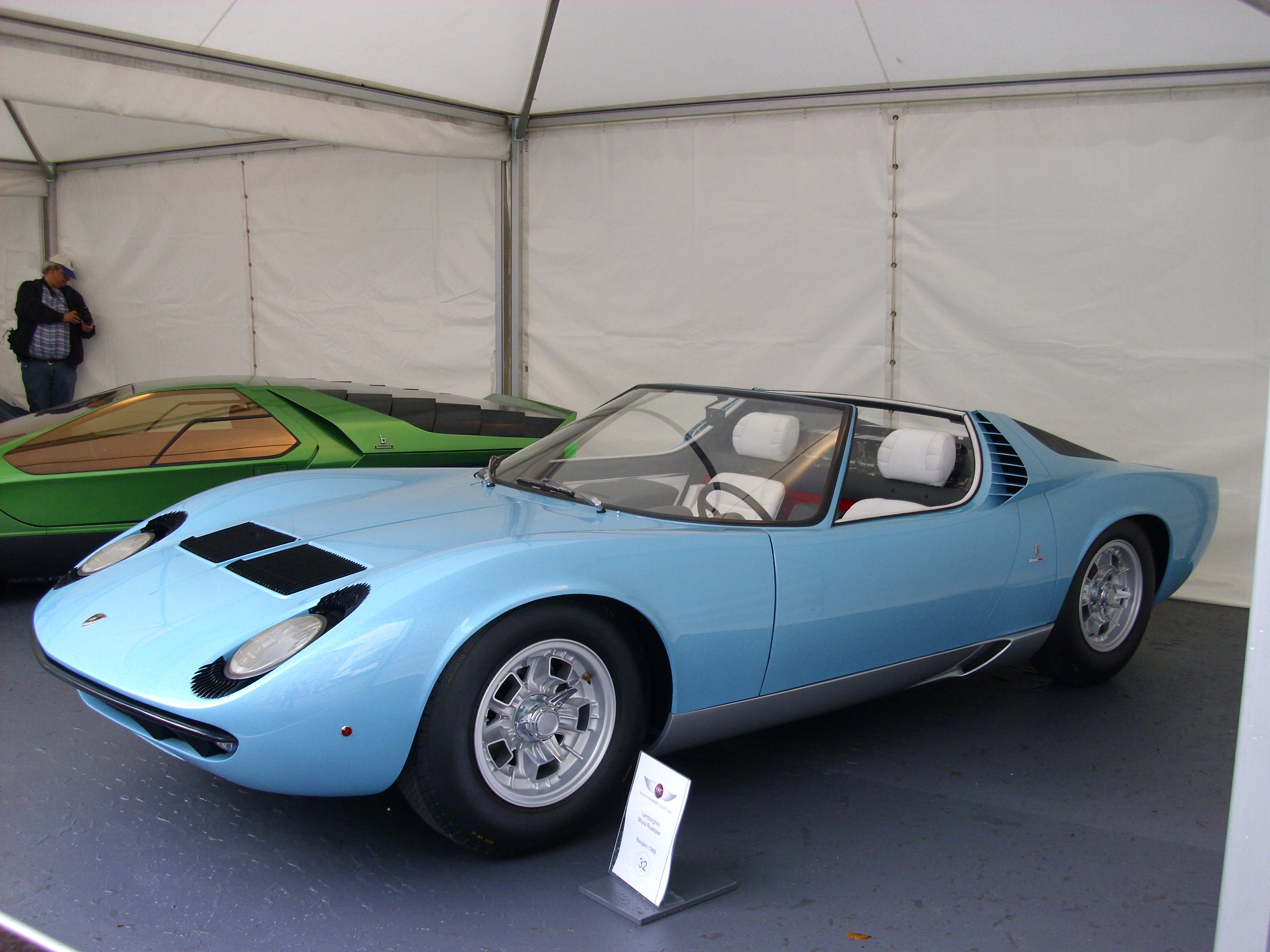
Miura Roadster

Another one-off, the Miura Roadster (actually more of a targa-model, but without a removable roof) was built by Bertone as a show car. Based on a P400, it was first shown at the 1968 Brussels Auto Show. Bertone used Fiat Dino Coupé taillights on the Roadster, while the early Miura's had Fiat 850 Spider units and the later ones used the taillights from the later Dino 2400 Coupé (also a Bertone design). After having been exhibited at several auto salons the car was sold to the International Lead Zinc Research Organization who turned it into a display-vehicle showcasing the possibilities of using zinc alloys in cars. The car was named the ZN75. A few other Miuras have had their tops removed, but this Bertone Miura Roadster was the only factory open-top Miura.

In 2006 the ZN75 was purchased by New York City real estate developer Adam Gordon. Gordon had Bobileff Motorcars in San Diego, California return the car to its original form. The restored car was first shown in August 2008 at the Pebble Beach Concours d'Elegance.

The one-of-a-kind Miura Roadster was shown at the Amelia Island Concours d'Elegance in 2013.

=== P400 SVJ Spider ===
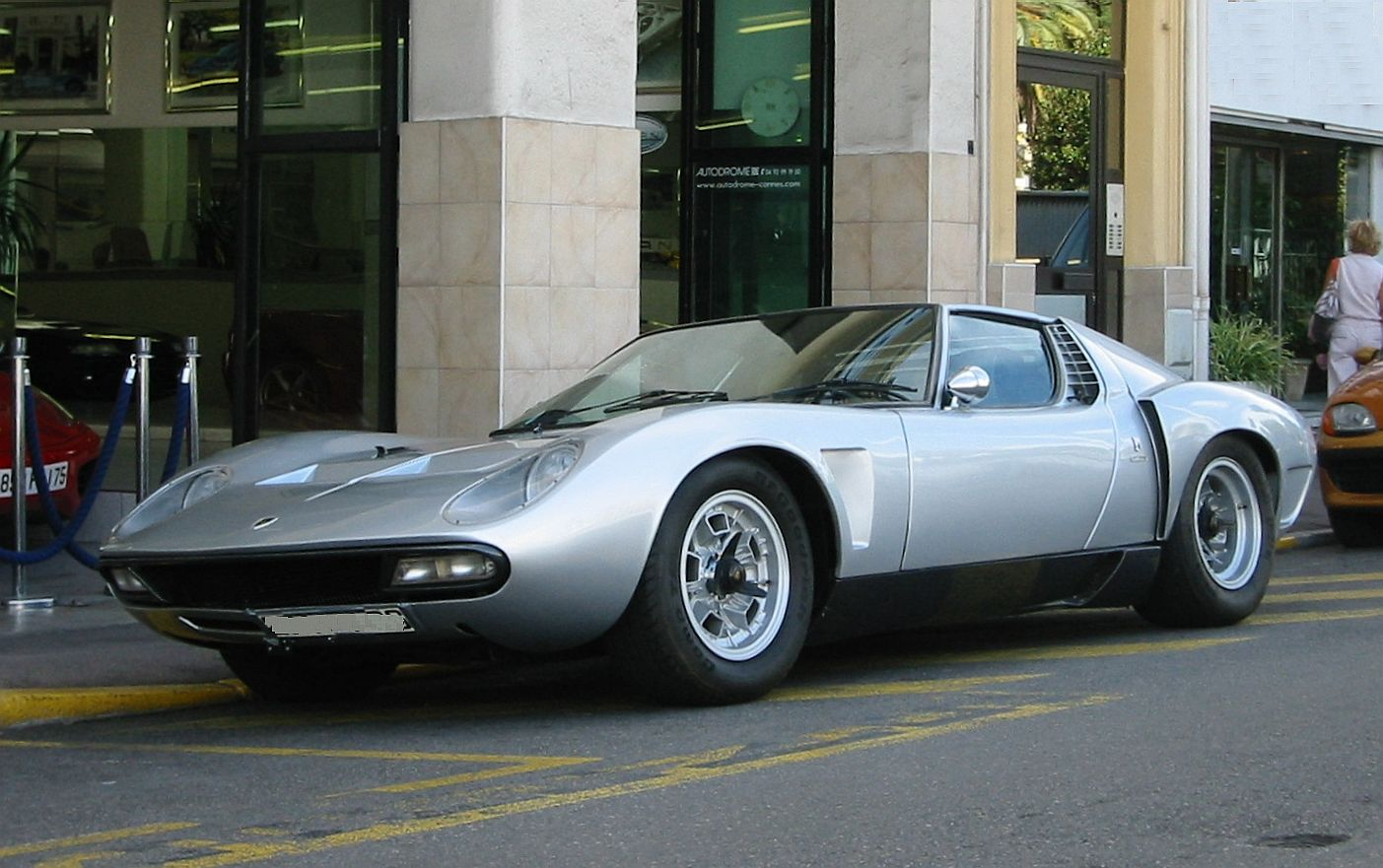
Miura 4808 with the targa top in place

This one-off example of the Miura was displayed at the 1981 Geneva Motor Show alongside other new Lamborghini models (Jalpa and LM002) shortly after new company CEO, Patrick Mimran, took over the factory although it was never factory authorized as a model. Finished in pearl white, the SVJ Spider was the formerly yellow Miura S presented at the 1971 Geneva Motor Show, and uses chassis #4808 Equipped with wide wheels and a rear wing reflecting the marque's revival, it was wrongly considered by some as a prototype for a possible limited series of Miura Spiders whereas in fact it was simply a one-off show car constructed on behalf of the Swiss Lamborghini importer Lambo-Motor AG (and as such is not an official factory modification or indeed has any link to the factory bar its original 1970 build).

Subsequently, when bought by Swiss Lamborghini collector Jean Wicki, the car had its rear wing and chin spoiler removed and was painted silver, bringing the car's style closer to the Berlinetta SVJ. During the modification of the rear panel, taillights from the Alfa Romeo Spider Series 2 were installed, replacing the initial Fiat Dino Coupé units (also fitted to the 1968 Roadster). Lamborghini specialist Autodrome (France) purchased the car from Wicki and restored its bodywork and upholstery in partnership with Carrosserie Lecoq (Paris). Painted traditional Miura lime green, the car was eventually sold to a Parisian collector. The car has stiffness issues and does not drive that well (as described by Miura expert Joe Sackey).

Other than private modifications, there are only two "open" Miuras, officially presented in International Motor shows: the Bertone Miura Roadster, exhibited on Bertone's own stand at Brussels in 1968, and this non-factory example, shown on the Lamborghini stand at the Geneva Motor Show in 1981.

== 2006 Miura concept ==
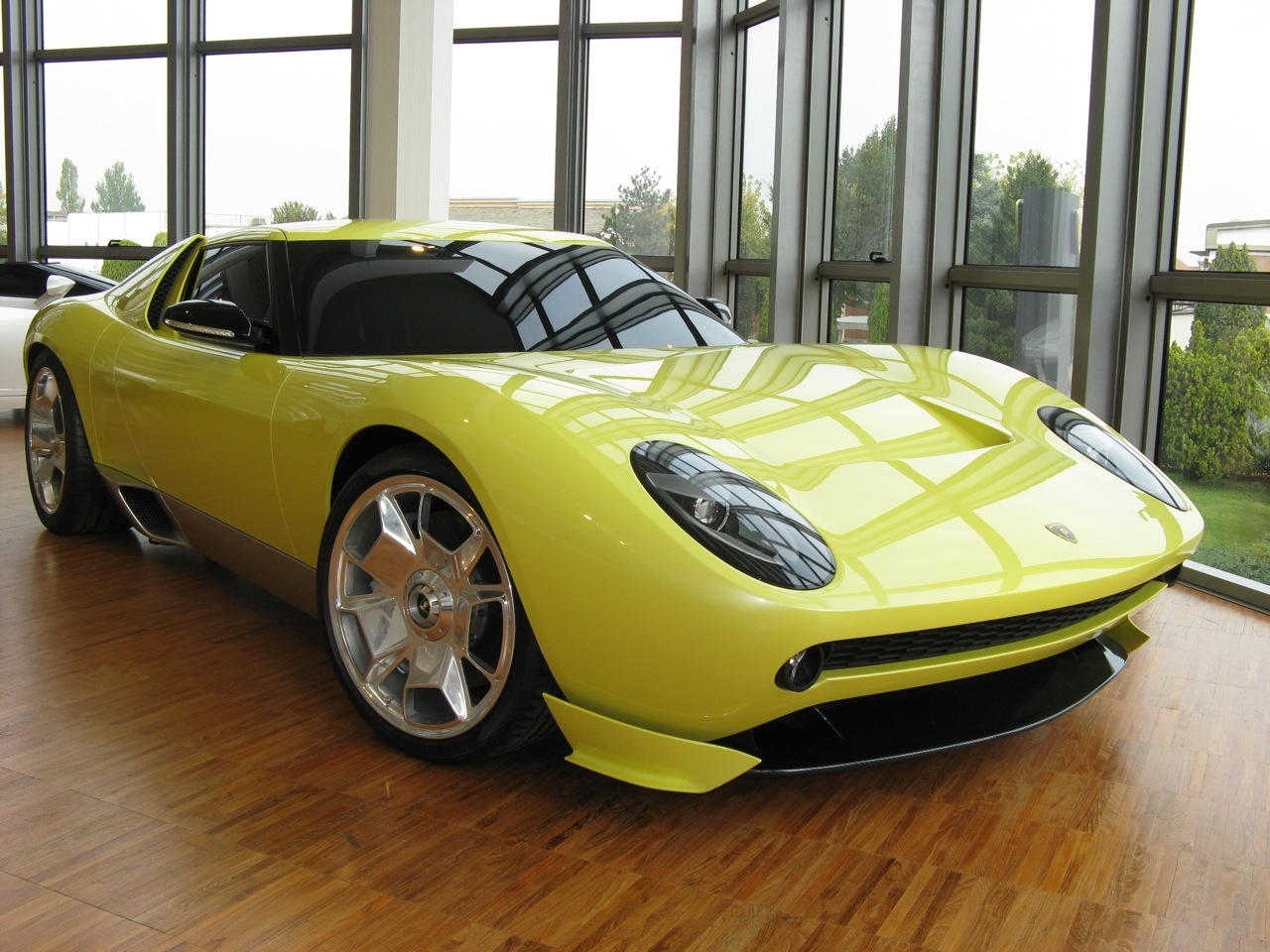
The 2006 concept car

A Miura concept car was presented at the American Museum of Television & Radio on 5 January 2006, alongside the Los Angeles Auto Show, though it was not presented at the show itself. Instead, the Miura concept car officially debuted at the North American International Auto Show two weeks later. It was the first design to be penned by Lamborghini design chief Walter de'Silva, commemorating the 40th anniversary of the 1966 Geneva introduction of the original Miura. Like the earlier 2005 Lamborghini Concept S, it introduce Y-shaped lighting elements that became a signature feature in subsequent models.

Lamborghini president and CEO Stefan Winkelmann denied that the concept would mark the Miura's return to production, saying “The Miura was a celebration of our history, but Lamborghini is about the future. Retro design is not what we are here for. So we won't do the Miura.”

== 2016 Lamborghini Special edition Aventador Miura Homage ==
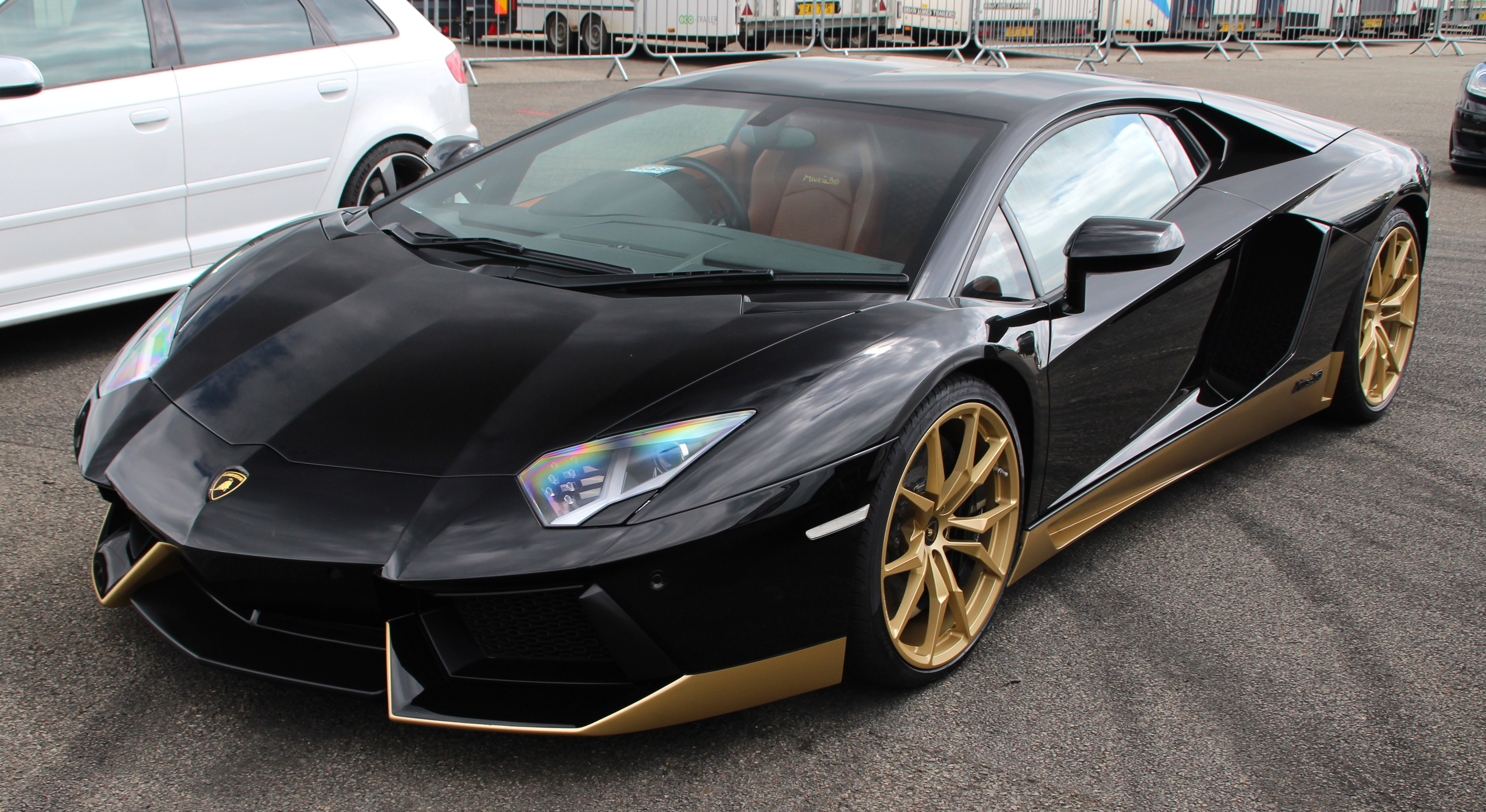
2016 Lamborghini Aventador LP700-4 Miura Homage

To celebrate the 50th anniversary of the Miura, Lamborghini unveiled the Aventador Miura Homage at the 2016 Goodwood Festival of Speed. The special edition car has been created by the company's Ad Personam customization division. There were only 50 units.

== Specifications ==
Lamborghini Miura	P400	P400S	P400SV
Produced:	1966–69; 275 built	1968–71; 338 built	1971–73; 150 built
Engine:	60° V-12 four-stroke; transverse-mounted Rear mid-engine, rear-wheel-drive layout		
Bore x Stroke:	82 mm × 62 mm (3.23 in × 2.44 in)		
Displacement:	3,929 cc (3.9 L; 239.8 cu in)		
Max. Power @ rpm:	350 PS (257 kW; 345 hp) @ 7000	370 PS (272 kW; 365 hp) @ 7700	385 PS (283 kW; 380 hp) @ 7850
Max. Torque @ rpm:	355 N⋅m (262 lb⋅ft) @ 5000	388 N⋅m (286 lb⋅ft) @ 5500	400 N⋅m (295 lb⋅ft) @ 5750
Compression Ratio:	9.5 : 1	10.7 : 1	10.7 : 1
Fuel feed:	Naturally aspirated, Four IDL40 3C 3-barrel downdraft Weber carburetors		
Valvetrain:	DOHC per cylinder bank, chain driven, bucket tappets, 2 valves per cylinder		
Cooling:	Liquid		
Gearbox:	5-speed-manual transmission, ratio 4.083:1		
Electrical system:	12 volt		
Front suspension:	Upper and lower wishbones, coil springs, stabilizing bar		
Rear suspension::	Upper and lower wishbones, coil springs, stabilizing bar		
Brakes:	Girling disc brakes all around, hydraulically operated		
Steering:	Rack and pinion		
Body structure:	Monocoque construction		
Dry weight:	1,125 kg (2,480 lb)	1,298 kg (2,862 lb)	1,298 kg (2,862 lb)
Track front/ rear:	1,400 mm (55 in) 1,400 mm (55 in)	1,400 mm (55 in) 1,400 mm (55 in)	1,400 mm (55 in) 1,540 mm (61 in)
Wheelbase:	2,500 mm (98 in)		
Length:	4,360 mm (172 in)		
Width:	1,760 mm (69 in)	1,760 mm (69 in)	1,780 mm (70 in)
Height:	1,060 mm (42 in)		
Tyre sizes:	Pirelli Cinturato 72 205 VR-15	GR70 VR 15	FR70 HR 15 front, GR70 VR 15 rear
Top speed (measured):	275 km/h (171 mph)	278 km/h (173 mph)	
Top speed (claimed):	300 km/h (186 mph)		
0–97 km/h (0–60 mph) (measured):	7.0	6.7 sec	
Fuel Consumption (measured):		21 L/100 km (13 mpg_{‑imp}; 11 mpg_{‑US})	

== Appearances in media ==
An orange Miura is seen driving through the Alps in the opening sequence of The Italian Job (1969). Although the film's events see the car destroyed by a bulldozer, the actual vehicle used in most of the shots still exists and was restored by Lamborghini's Polo Storico division in 2019. Two cars were supplied to Paramount Pictures by the Lamborghini factory for the scene, one of which was already wrecked and used for the post-crash scenes in the film.

== See also ==
- Alfa Romeo 33 Stradale
- De Tomaso Mangusta
- Ferrari Daytona
- Iso Grifo
- Maserati Ghibli
