= Lamborghini Urraco =

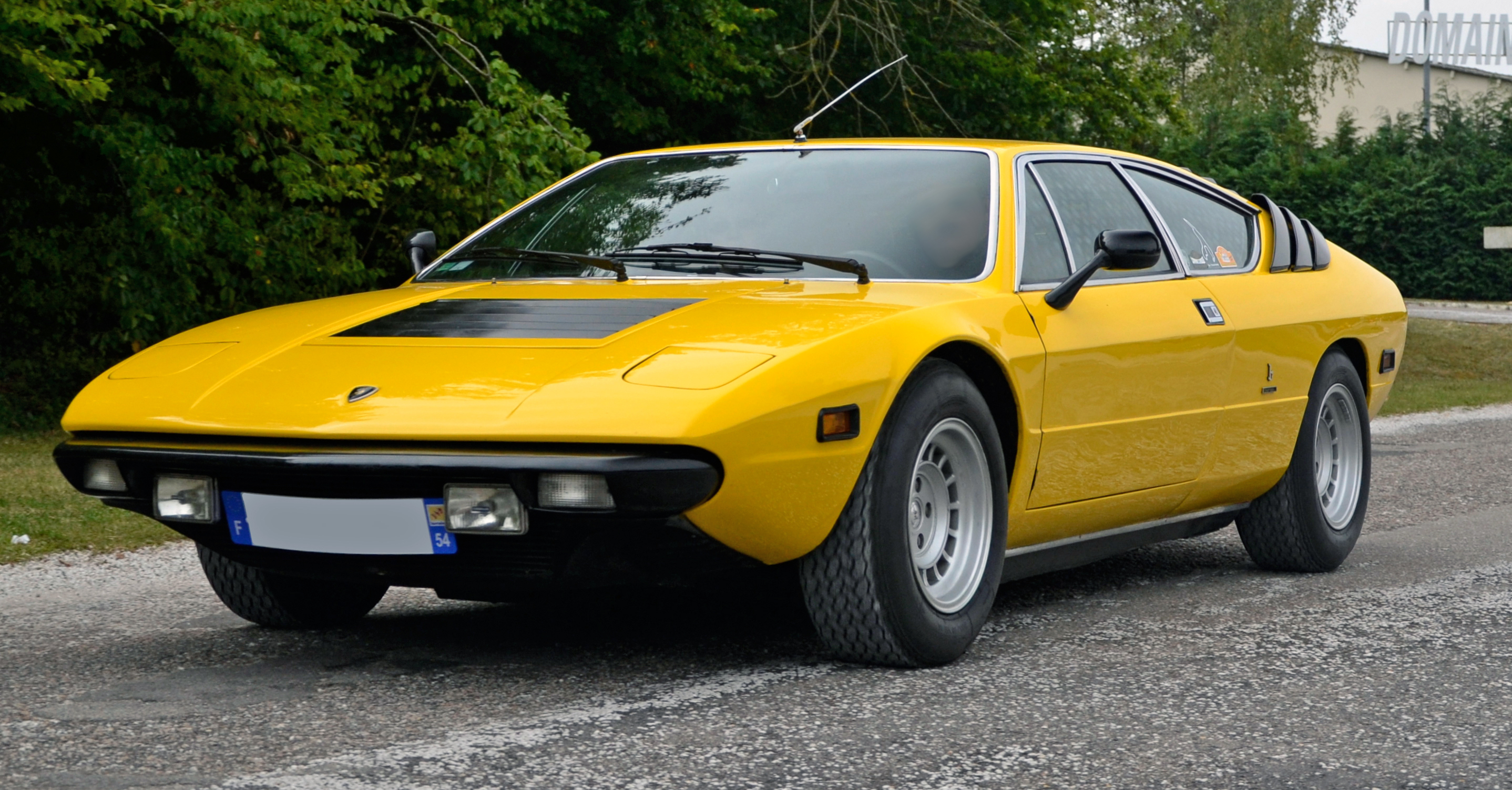

Overview
- Manufacturer: Lamborghini
- Production: 1972–1979; 791 produced
- Assembly: Italy: Sant'Agata Bolognese
- Designer: Marcello Gandini at Bertone

Body and chassis
- Class: Sports car
- Body style: 2+2 coupé
- Layout: Transverse mid-engine, rear-wheel-drive
- Related: Lamborghini Silhouette; Lamborghini Jalpa; Lamborghini Espada

Powertrain
- Engine: 2.0 L (1,995 cc) Lamborghini V8 (P200); 2.5 L (2,463 cc) Lamborghini L240 V8 (P250 & P111); 3.0 L (2,996 cc) Lamborghini V8 (P300)
- Transmission: 5-speed manual

Dimensions
- Wheelbase: 2,450 mm (96.5 in)
- Length: 4,250 mm (167.3 in)
- Width: 1,760 mm (69.3 in)
- Height: 1,160 mm (45.7 in)
- Kerb weight: 1,250–1,300 kg (2,756–2,866 lb)

Chronology
- Successor: Lamborghini Silhouette

The Lamborghini Urraco is a 2+2 sports car manufactured by Italian automaker Lamborghini, introduced at the Turin Auto Show in 1970 and marketed for 1972–1979 model years. It was named after a line of Miura-bred fighting bulls.

== History ==
The car is a 2+2 coupé with body designed by Marcello Gandini, at the time working for Carrozzeria Bertone. Rather than being another range topping sports car, like the Lamborghini Miura, the Urraco was intended to be more affordable and an alternative to the contemporary Ferrari Dino, Maserati Merak and Porsche 911.

The Urraco debuted as a prototype at the Turin Auto show in 1970, but took a further 2 years before production began with the P250. This was quickly revised with the P250S in 1973. Revisions for the Urraco S included full leather upholstery, tinted power windows and optional metallic paint. The engine received new Weber 40 DCNF carburetors for cars with no emission control. The P300 was introduced in 1974, featuring not only an increase in displacement to 3 liters, but also was chain driven, and featured dual overhead cams and a revised cylinder head. When production ceased in 1979, 791 Urracos had been built - Urraco P200 (77 Produced), Urraco P250 (520 produced) and Urraco P300 (190 Produced) with 2-litre, 2.5-litre, and 3-litre V8s respectively. Of the P250s, 21 were Urraco P111s (P250 Tipo 111s) for the American market. In order to comply with American regulations, these cars had larger front bumpers and emissions controls, the latter resulting in less horsepower. It is approximated that only 10% of Urracos were RHD, with the majority produced as LHD examples. The P200 was intended for domestic market, due to the Italy having a 38% VAT tax on vehicles with engine displacement over 2 litres.

The Lamborghini Silhouette, with its detachable roof panel, and its successor the Lamborghini Jalpa, with a 3.5 liter V-8 engine, were based upon the Urraco.

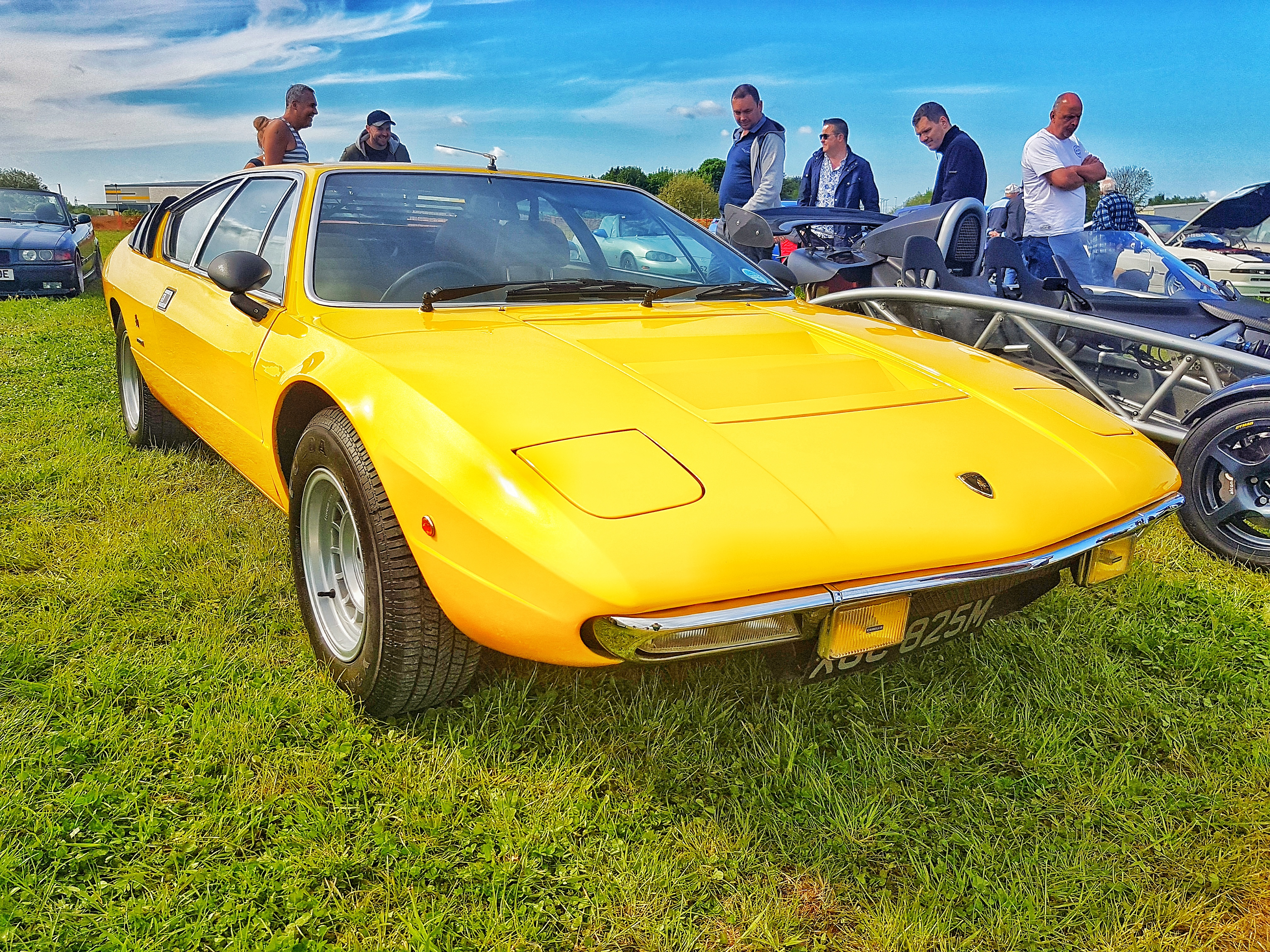
Lamborghini Urraco 2

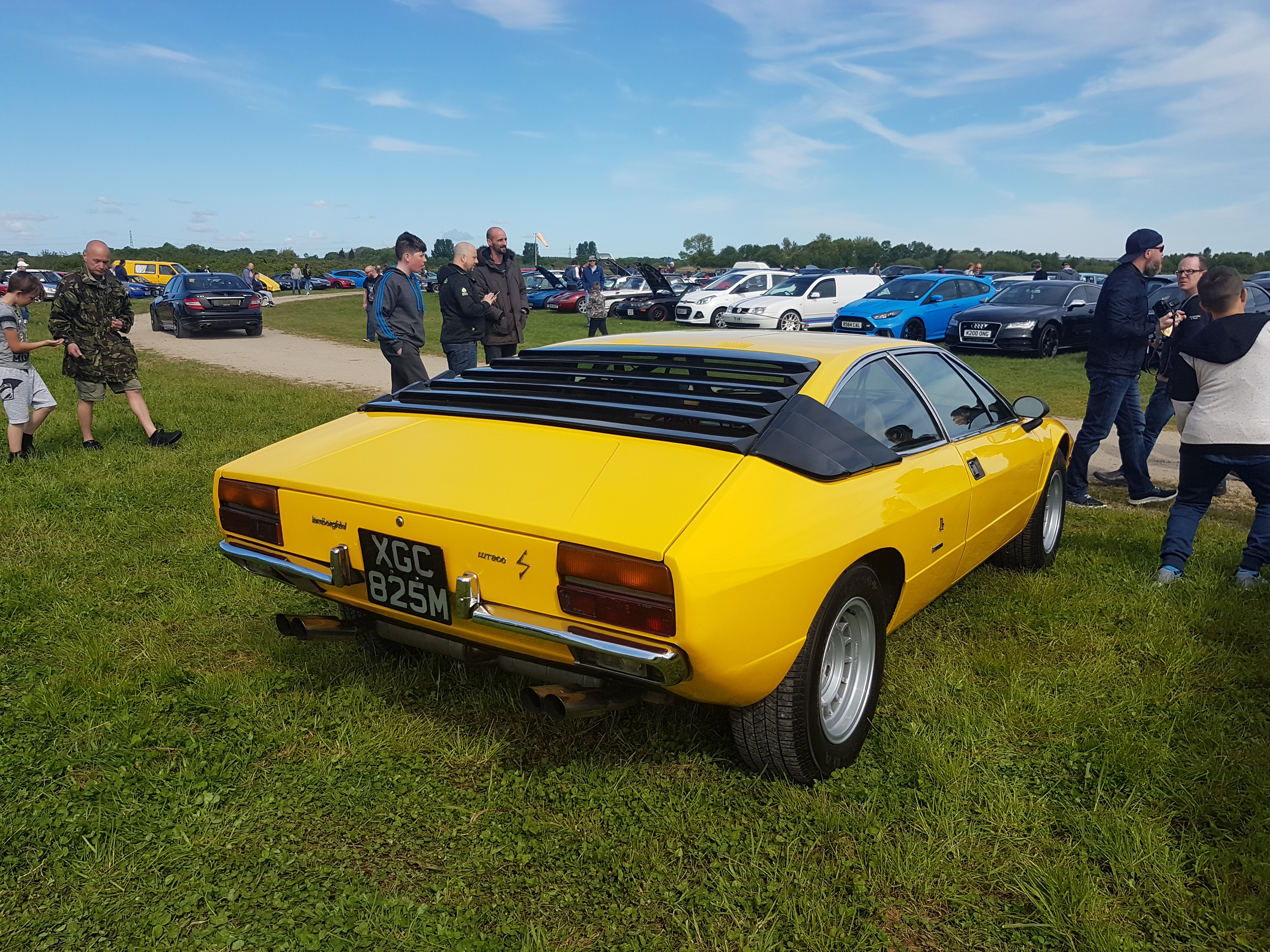
Lamborghini Urraco

== Specifications and performance ==
The Urraco initially featured a 2-litre single overhead cam crossplane V8. The later 2.5-litre and 3-litre V8s employed dual overhead cams.

Model	Engine	Displacement	Bore x Stroke	Compression Ratio	Max power	Max torque	0–100 km/h (0-62 mph)	Top speed	Units
P200	V8 OHC 16V	1,994 cc	77.4 mm x 53 mm	8.6:1	182 PS (134 kW; 180 hp) at 7,500 rpm	176 N⋅m (130 lb⋅ft) at 3,800 rpm	7.2 s	215 km/h (134 mph)	66
P250	V8 OHC 16V	2,463 cc	86 mm x 53 mm	10.5:1	220 PS (162 kW; 217 hp) at 7,500 rpm	220 N⋅m (162 lb⋅ft) at 3,750 rpm	6.9 s	240 km/h (149 mph)	520
P300	V8 DOHC 16V	2,996 cc	86 mm x 64.5 mm	10.5:1	250 PS (184 kW; 247 hp) at 7,500 rpm	265 N⋅m (195 lb⋅ft) at 3,500 rpm	5.6 s	260 km/h (162 mph)	190

== Sources ==
- Lamborghini Registry
