= Lamborghini V8 =

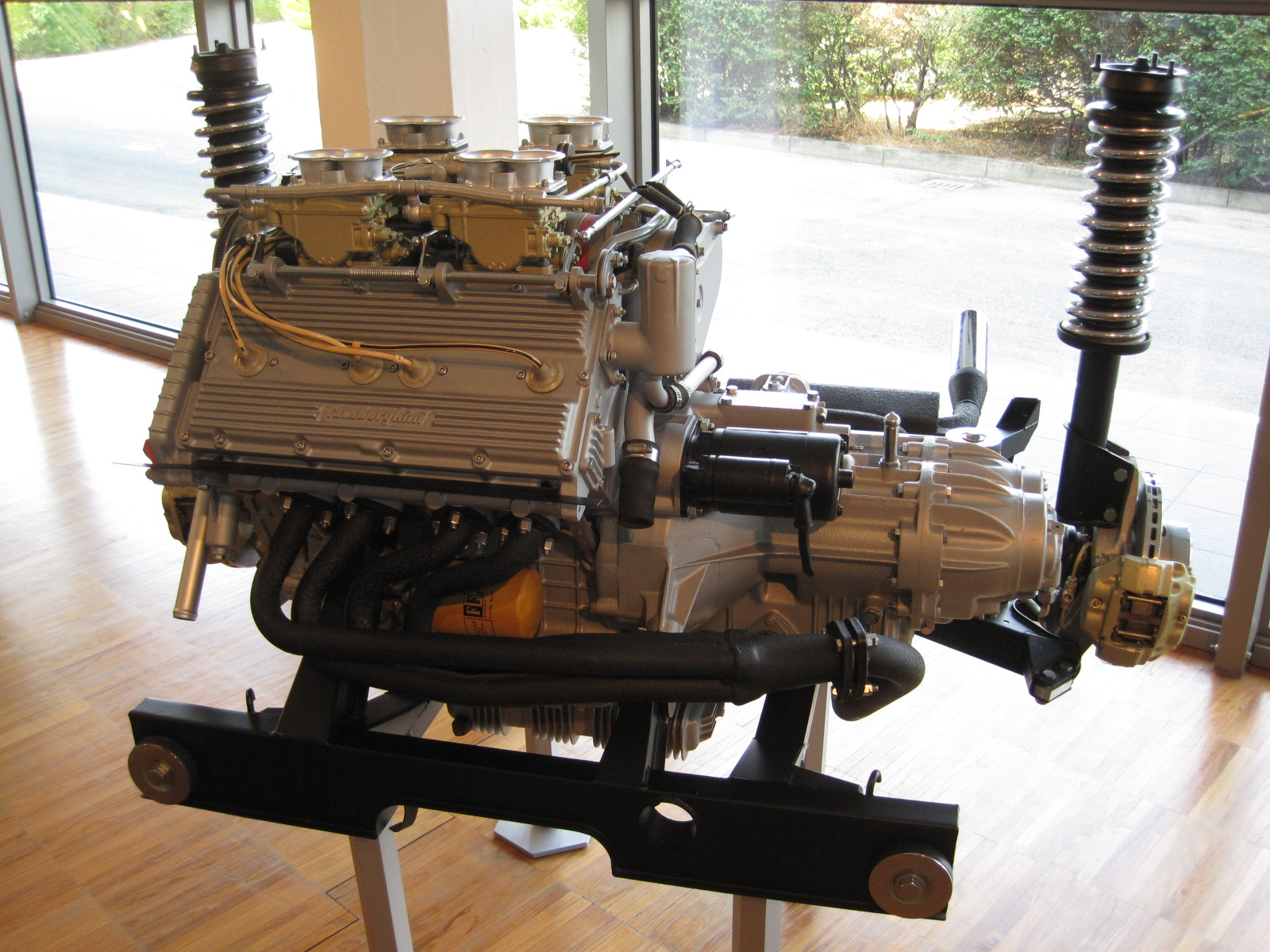

Overview
- Manufacturer: (Italy) Lamborghini
- Production: 1971–1988

Layout
- Configuration: Naturally aspirated 90° V8
- Displacement: 2.0 L; 121.7 cu in (1,995 cc); 2.5 L; 150.3 cu in (2,463 cc); 3.0 L; 182.9 cu in (2,997 cc); 3.5 L; 212.7 cu in (3,485 cc); 3.8 L; 231.8 cu in (3,798 cc); 4.0 L; 243.8 cu in (3,995 cc)
- Cylinder bore: 2.0: 77.4 mm (3.05 in); 2.5/3.0/3.5: 86 mm (3.39 in); 4.0/L411: 90 mm (3.54 in); 3.8/GTP: 91 mm (3.58 in)
- Piston stroke: 2.0/2.5: 53 mm (2.09 in); 3.0: 64.5 mm (2.54 in); 3.5: 75 mm (2.95 in); 4.0/L411: 78.5 mm (3.09 in); 3.8/GTP: 73 mm (2.87 in)
- Cylinder block material: Cast aluminium alloy
- Cylinder head material: Cast aluminium alloy
- Valvetrain: 2 valves per cylinder, 2.0/2.5: SOHC, 3.0/3.5/3.8/4.0: DOHC

Combustion
- Fuel system: Solex or Weber carburetors
- Fuel type: Petrol/Gasoline
- Oil system: Wet sump
- Cooling system: Water-cooled

Output
- Power output: 2.0: 136 kW (185 PS; 182 bhp) at 7,800 rpm 2.5: 164 kW (223 PS; 220 bhp) at 7,500 rpm 3.0: 186 kW (253 PS; 249 bhp) at 7,500 rpm, or 194 kW (264 PS; 260 bhp) at 7,500 rpm, or 198 kW (269 PS; 266 bhp) at 7,800 rpm 3.5: 190 kW (258 PS; 255 bhp) at 7,000 rpm 4.0/L411: 588 kW (799 PS; 789 bhp) at 9.000 - 9,750 rpm 3.8/GTP: 500 kW (680 PS; 671 bhp) at 10,000 rpm
- Specific power: 2.0: 68.2 kW (92.7 PS; 91.5 bhp) per litre 3.5: 54.5 kW (74.1 PS; 73.1 bhp) per litre 3.8/GTP: 131.6 kW (178.9 PS; 176.5 bhp) per litre
- Torque output: 3.0: 273 N⋅m (201 lb⋅ft) at 5,750 rpm 4.0/L411: 730 N⋅m (538 lb⋅ft) at 4.000 - 7,000 rpm

Chronology
- Successor: Lamborghini V10 (indirect)

The Lamborghini V8 is a ninety degree (90°) V8 petrol engine designed by Lamborghini in the 1970s for their less-expensive vehicles. It was only the second internal combustion engine ever developed by the company, and first saw production for the 1971 Lamborghini Urraco. It was designed by Giampaolo Dallara. The all-aluminium alloy engine was introduced as a 2.5-litre variant, displacing 2,463 cc (150.3 cu in), but was expanded, by increasing the piston stroke to a 3.0-litre variant for 1975 - now displacing 2,997 cc (182.9 cu in).

A 2.0-litre reduced-stroke version was also introduced in 1975 for sale in Italy, displacing 1,994 cc (121.7 cu in), because of Italian legislation which imposed punitive taxes on cars whose engines displaced more than 2.0 litres.

This V8 engine was also used in two other models, the Lamborghini Silhouette in 1976–1977 in which it kept the 3.0-litre displacement, and the slightly updated replacement in 1982, the Lamborghini Jalpa, which saw the engine increased in size to 3.5 litres, displacing 3,485 cc (212.7 cu in), for ease in meeting ever-tighter emissions requirements.

== Specifications ==
engine configuration
90° V8 engine; wet sump lubrication system
engine displacement etc.
2.0: 1,995 cc (121.7 cu in); bore x stroke: 77.4 mm × 53 mm (3.05 in × 2.09 in) (stroke ratio: 1.46:1 - oversquare/short-stroke), 249.4 cc (15.2 cu in) per cylinder
2.5: 2,463 cc (150.3 cu in); bore x stroke: 86 mm × 53 mm (3.39 in × 2.09 in) (stroke ratio: 1.62:1 - oversquare/short-stroke), 307.9 cc (18.8 cu in) per cylinder
3.0: 2,997 cc (182.9 cu in); bore x stroke: 86 mm × 64.5 mm (3.39 in × 2.54 in) (stroke ratio: 1.58:1 - oversquare/short-stroke), 374.6 cc (22.9 cu in) per cylinder
3.5: 3,485 cc (212.7 cu in); bore x stroke: 86 mm × 75 mm (3.39 in × 2.95 in) (stroke ratio: 1.15:1 - oversquare/short-stroke), 435.6 cc (26.6 cu in) per cylinder
cylinder block and crankcase
cast aluminium alloy
cylinder heads and valvetrain
2.0/2.5: cast aluminium alloy, two valves per cylinder, 16 valves total, belt driven single overhead camshafts
3.0/3.5: cast aluminium alloy, two valves per cylinder, 16 valves total, chain driven double overhead camshafts
aspiration
Naturally aspirated
fuel system
2.0: 4 twin-barrel down-draught Weber 40 IDF 1 carburettors
2.5: 4 twin-barrel down-draught Weber 40 IDF 1 or Solex C40P117 carburettors
3.0: 4 twin-barrel down-draught Weber 40 DCNF carburetors
3.5: 4 twin-barrel down-draught Weber 42 DCNF carburetors
ignition system and engine management
2 Magnetti Marelli coils and 1 Marelli Distributor S127E
exhaust system
2 Four-way manifolds to twin silencers
2.0 rated motive power & torque outputs and applications
136 kW (185 PS; 182 bhp) at 7,800 rpm; — Lamborghini Urraco
2.5 rated motive power & torque outputs and applications
164 kW (223 PS; 220 bhp) at 7,500 rpm; — Lamborghini Urraco
3.0 rated motive power & torque outputs and applications
273 N⋅m (201 lb⋅ft) at 5,750 rpm
186 kW (253 PS; 249 bhp) at 7,500 rpm; — Lamborghini Urraco
194 kW (264 PS; 260 bhp) at 7,500 rpm; — Lamborghini Silhouette
198 kW (269 PS; 266 bhp) at 7,800 rpm; — Lamborghini Urraco
3.5 rated motive power & torque outputs and applications
190 kW (258 PS; 255 bhp) at 7,000 rpm; — Lamborghini Jalpa
