= Lamborghini Silhouette =

Overview
- Manufacturer: Bertone for Lamborghini
- Also called: Lamborghini Silhouette P300
- Production: 1976–1979; 54 produced
- Assembly: Italy: Sant'Agata Bolognese
- Designer: Marcello Gandini at Bertone

Body and chassis
- Class: Sports car
- Body style: 2-door targa
- Layout: Transverse mid-engine, rear-wheel drive

Powertrain
- Engine: 3.0 L (2,997 cc) Lamborghini V8
- Power output: 268.9 PS (198 kW; 265 bhp) and 275 N⋅m (203 lbf⋅ft) of torque
- Transmission: 5-speed manual

Dimensions
- Wheelbase: 2,450 mm (96.5 in)
- Length: 4,320 mm (170.1 in)
- Width: 1,880 mm (74.0 in)
- Height: 1,120 mm (44.1 in)
- Kerb weight: 1,240 kg (2,734 lb)

Chronology
- Predecessor: Lamborghini Urraco
- Successor: Lamborghini Jalpa

The Lamborghini Silhouette is a two-door two-seat mid-engined rear-wheel drive sports car that was made by Lamborghini between 1976 and 1979 in small numbers.

Officially presented at the 1976 Geneva Auto Show, the Silhouette began as a styling exercise by noted Italian Carrozzeria Bertone. It was based on the earlier Lamborghini Urraco, but was distinguished from the Urraco by more angular styling. The Silhouette was the first Lamborghini to employ a targa top roof. The Silhouette later evolved into the similar looking but more successful Lamborghini Jalpa. The car had a 3.0-litre all-aluminium alloy Lamborghini V8 engine mounted transversely behind the driver. Of the 54 units (42 left-hand-drive and 12 right-hand drive), 31 are currently known to exist.

Official performance figures indicate the Silhouette could complete the 0 to 100 km/h (0 to 62 mph) sprint in 6.5 seconds, 0 to 100 mph (0 to 161 km/h) in 16.1 seconds, and could reach a top speed of 260 km/h (162 mph)

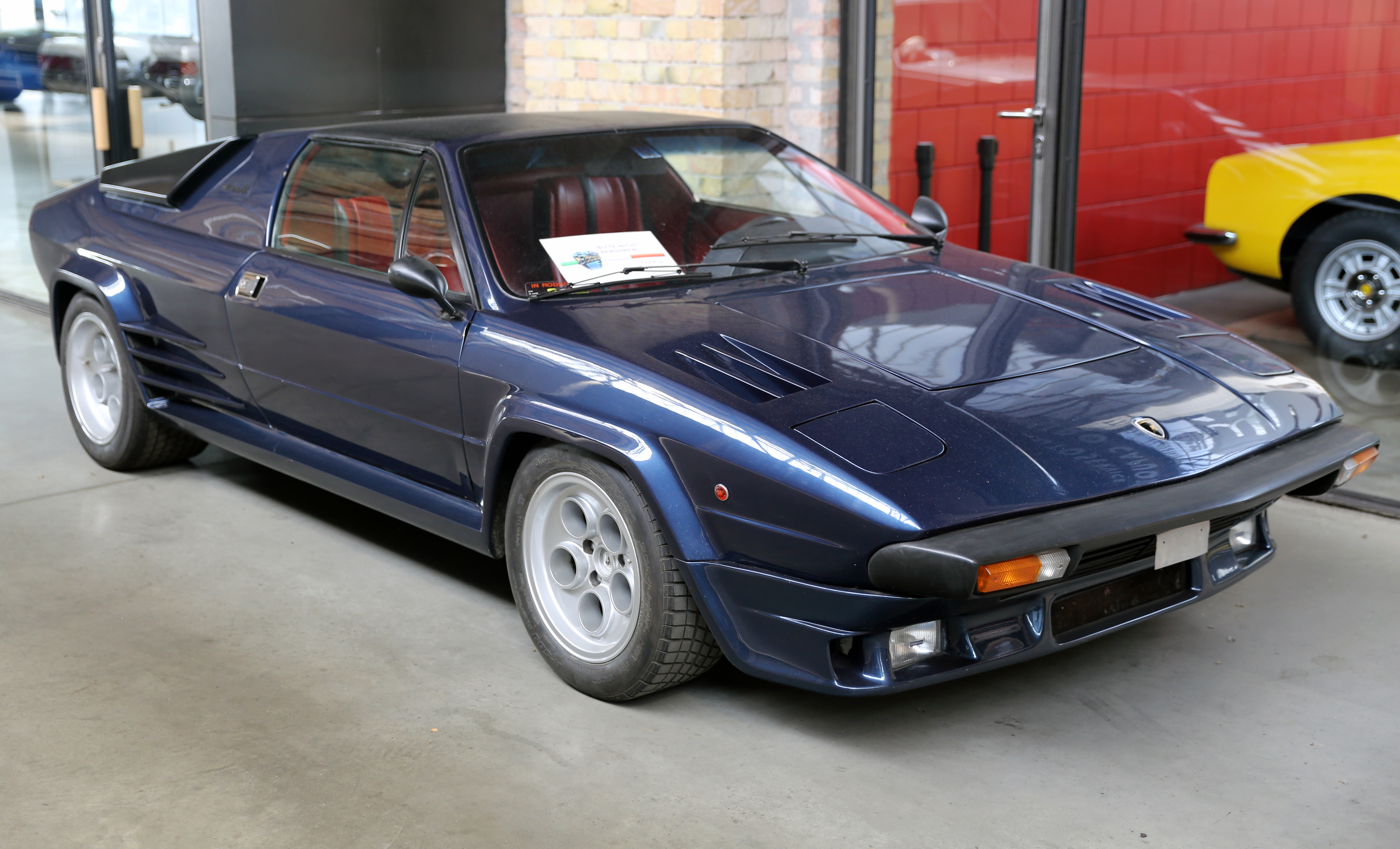
Front side view

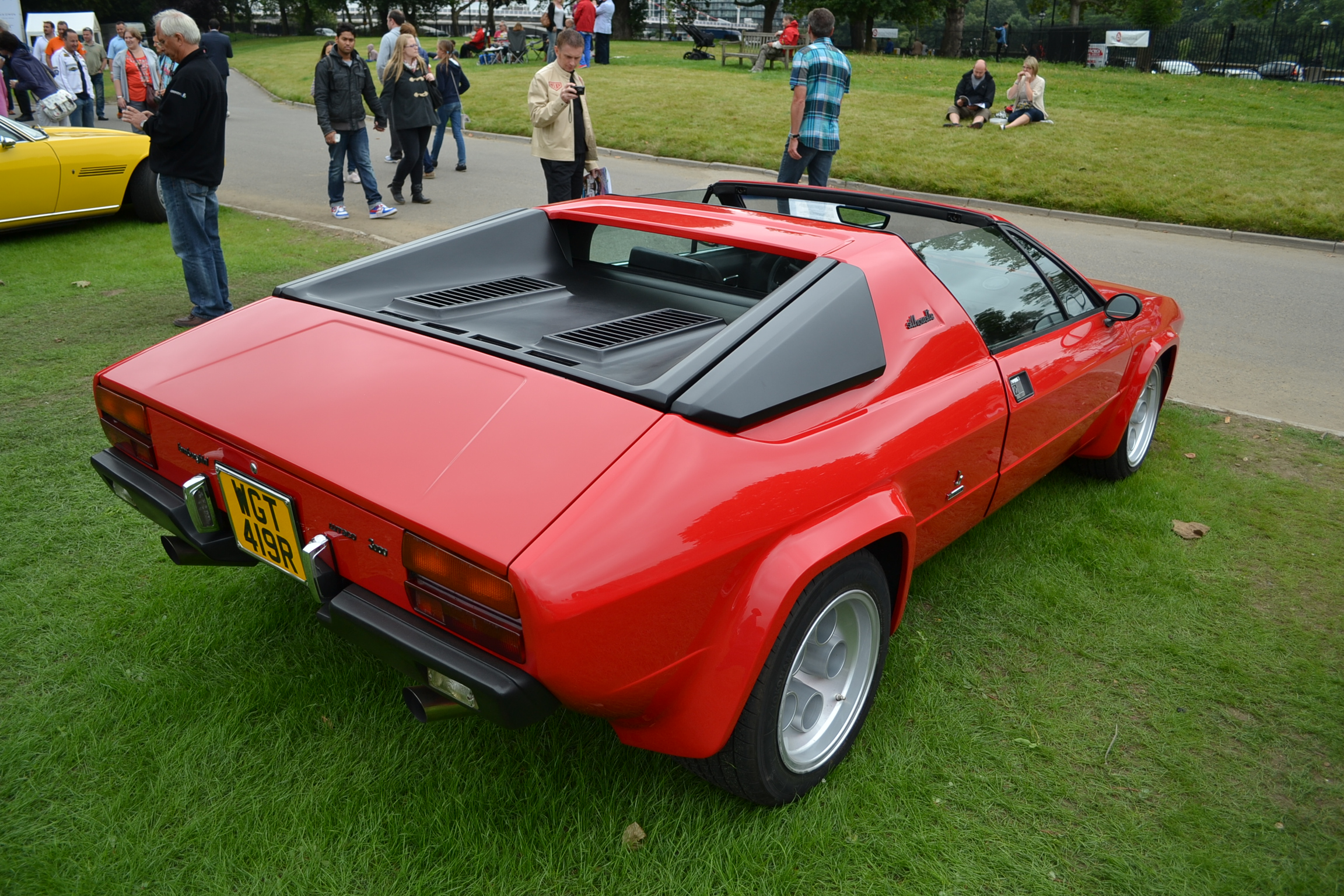
Rear
