= Lamborghini Jalpa =

Entry level sports car manufactured by Lamborghini from 1981 to 1988

Overview
- Manufacturer: Lamborghini
- Also called: Lamborghini Jalpa P350
- Production: 1981–1988 (410 produced)
- Assembly: Italy: Sant'Agata Bolognese
- Designer: Marc Deschamps at Bertone

Body and chassis
- Class: Sports car (S)
- Body style: 2-door targa 2-door roadster (Jalpa Spyder)
- Layout: Transverse mid-engine, rear-wheel drive

Powertrain
- Engine: 3.5 L (3,485 cc) L353 V8
- Transmission: 5-speed synchromesh manual

Dimensions
- Wheelbase: 2,451 mm (96.5 in)
- Length: 4,330 mm (170.5 in)
- Width: 1,880 mm (74.0 in)
- Height: 1,140 mm (44.9 in)
- Kerb weight: 1,510 kg (3,329 lb)

Chronology
- Predecessor: Lamborghini Silhouette
- Successor: Lamborghini Gallardo

The Lamborghini Jalpa (Spanish pronunciation: [ˈxalpa]) is a sports car produced by the Italian automotive manufacturer Lamborghini from 1981 until 1988. It debuted at the 1981 Geneva Motor Show alongside the Lamborghini LM001 concept off-road vehicle. The Jalpa was the last Lamborghini to use a V8 engine until the Urus SUV in 2018.

== Overview ==
The Jalpa was a development of the earlier Silhouette intended to fill a role as a more "affordable" Lamborghini, being much less expensive than the flagship Countach and being also designed by Bertone. Compared to the Countach, the Jalpa was much easier to drive, having better visibility and being more tractable in heavy traffic and at slow speeds, although reviewers have noted that it had heavy steering and throttle. Chief engineer at that time was Giulio Alfieri.

=== Name ===
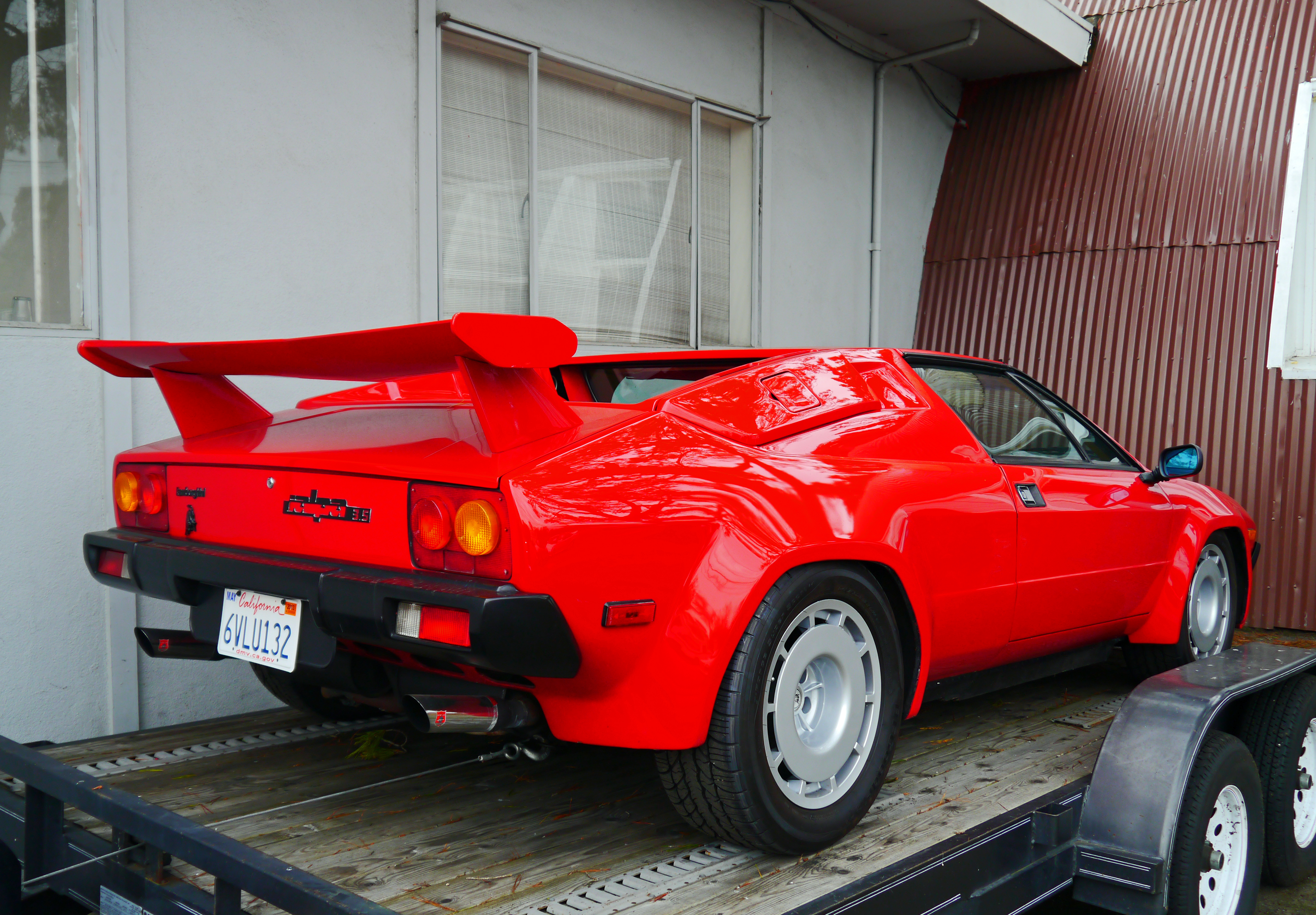
Rear 3/4 view of the Jalpa (with the optional rear wing)

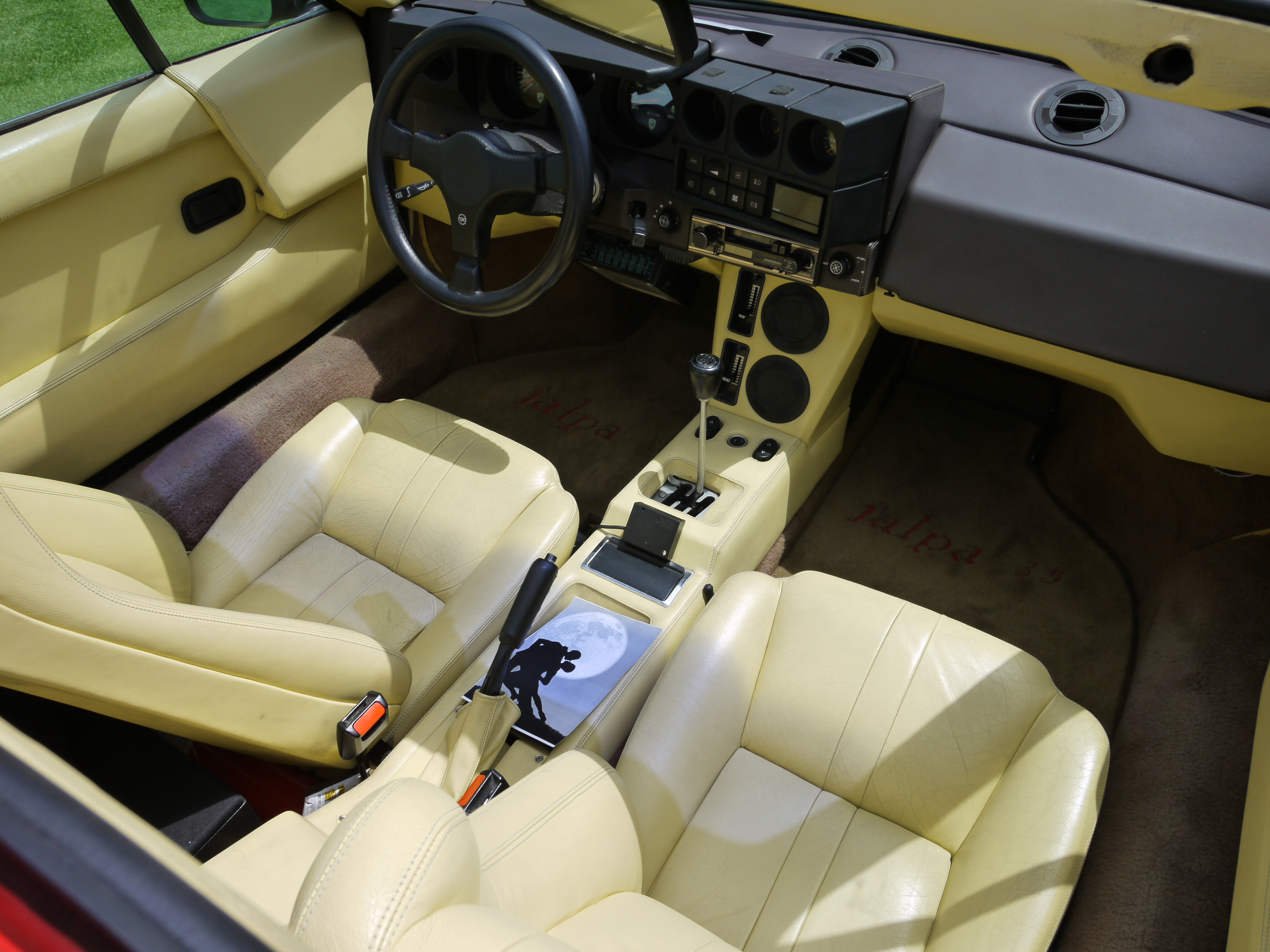
Interior

The name Jalpa Kandachia came from a famous breed of fighting bulls, a tradition later followed with the Gallardo.

=== Engine ===
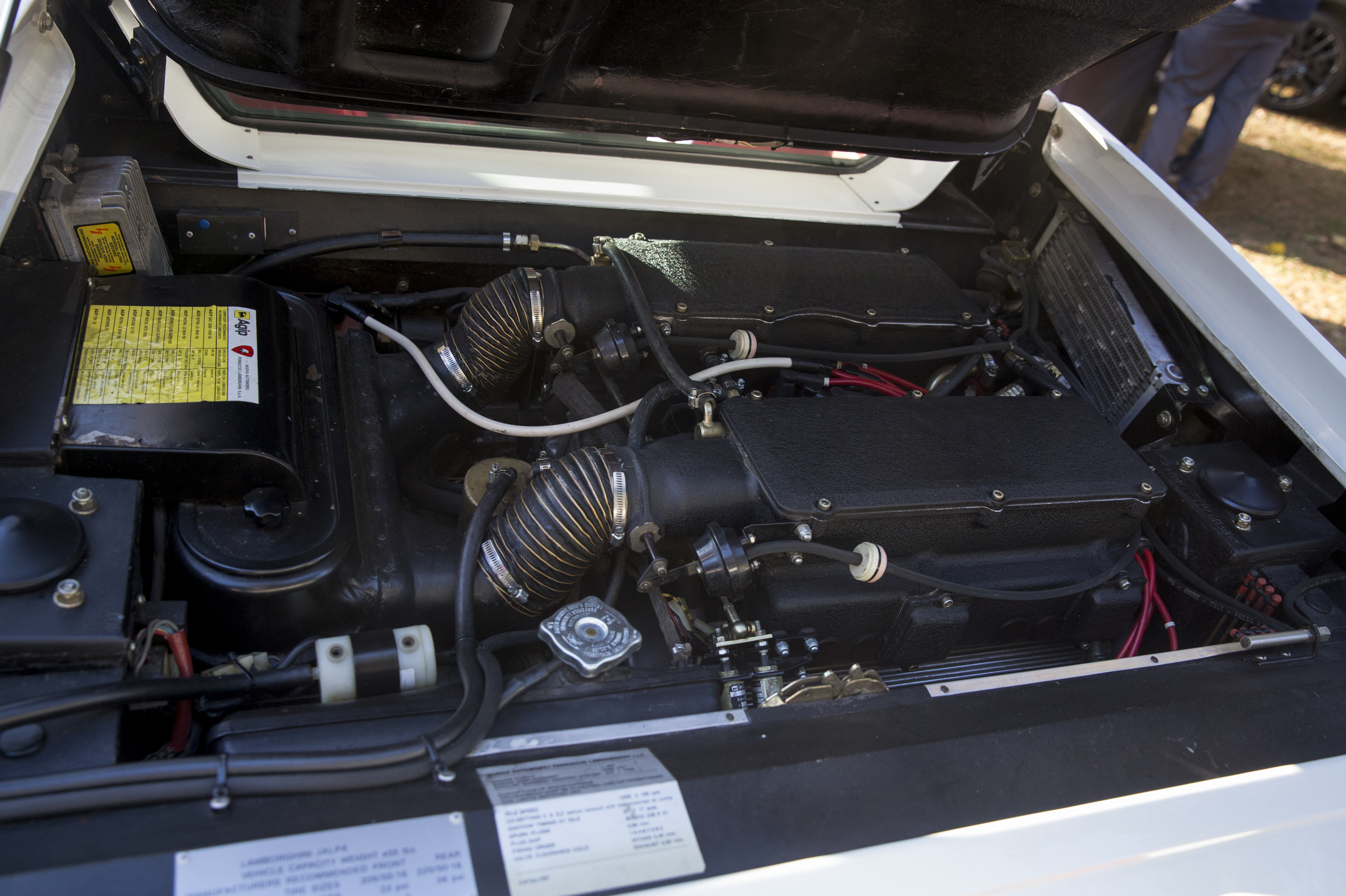
The 3.5-litre transverse V8 engine in a 1988, US-spec Jalpa

The Jalpa was fitted with a 3.5 L (210 cu in) double overhead camshaft version of the V8 engine used in the Silhouette on which it was based, designated the L353. The version used in the Jalpa had a power output of 255 PS (188 kW; 252 hp) at 7,000 rpm and 225 lb⋅ft (305 N⋅m) of torque at 4,000 rpm in European specification. The engine in the US models had a power output of 250 hp (186 kW; 253 PS). Fuel flow was managed by four twin-barrel down-draught Weber 42 DCNF carburetors.

=== Performance ===
Lamborghini claimed the Jalpa could accelerate from 0 to 100 km/h (62 mph) in 6.0 seconds, to 161 km/h (100 mph) in 19.1 seconds and a 1/4 mile time of 15.4 at 148 km/h (92 mph) with a top speed of 249 km/h (155 mph), Curb weight was 1,510 kg (3,329 lb). The performance of the Jalpa was comparable to the entry-level Ferrari 328 which was based on the older Ferrari 308.

Classic & Sports Car magazine quoted a 0–97 km/h (0–60 mph) acceleration time of 6.8 seconds and a 0–161 km/h time of 16 seconds for the Jalpa, while Car and Driver reported a 0–60 mph acceleration time of 5.8 seconds.

=== Revisions and end of production ===
When Lamborghini was sold in 1980, the plastic components (bumpers, air intakes and engine cover) were black, and the car carried over the rectangular taillights of the Silhouette along with a targa top body style. This was changed in 1984 when round taillights were fitted and the black plastic parts were replaced by parts in body colour. A rear wing, as with the Countach, was optional.

In 1988, after falling sales and new ownership by Chrysler, Lamborghini decided to end Jalpa production despite its being Lamborghini's second most successful V8 car to date (after the Urraco), having sold 410 units.
