= Lamborghini Militaria =

Series of off-road utility trucks and SUVs

The Lamborghini Militaria (Lamborghini LM series; the Rambo Lambos) were a series of off-road utility trucks produced by automotive manufacturer Lamborghini. It was started as an attempt at the military light utility truck market (the "jeep" market segment). The vehicles in the series are greatly reminiscent of the FMC XR311, and is in turn reminiscent of the Humvee (U.S. Army HMMWV). The series expanded into the luxury sport utility market, and its primary production run was the Lamborghini LM002, which sold over 300 units. It is considered the pioneer of the luxury sport utility market, all other comparable vehicles being utility rather than luxury. This chassis family existed from 1977 through 1993.

== Models ==
- Lamborghini Cheetah, prototype military light truck (1977) US-Italian joint venture
- Lamborghini LM001, prototype offroad truck (1981)
- Lamborghini LMA002, offroad truck concept vehicle (1982)
- Lamborghini LM002, production model offroad utility truck (MY1986-MY1993) generally with the powerplant of the Lamborghini Countach
- Lamborghini LM003, prototype military light truck (1997)
- Lamborghini LM004, prototype ultraluxury offroad truck

== Successors ==
Several successors to the Lamborghini Militaria were mooted.

In 1997, MegaTech, then owners of Lamborghini, initiated a project to create a new vehicle in the luxury SUV segment as successor to the LM002, codenamed LM003 (though this model number was already previously used), it would be called the Borneo or Galileo; and be similar to a Range Rover; as an Indonesian joint venture with Timor. The vehicle was designed by Nori Harada's team at SZ Design (formerly Zagato), which also built a mockup.

In 2006, Lamborghini again tried to resurrect its SUV segment, with the Lamborghini Lagartijo (LM005). This would use the powerplant from the Lamborghini Murcielago in a chassis similar to the LM002.

In 2010, Lamborghini, then already owned by the Volkswagen Group, started the LM00X project that would become the Urus, with an Audi Q5 platform and Audi S7 V8 Turbo. In 2012, they unveiled a concept car, the Urus; which was similar to a Porsche Cayenne and Bentley Bentayga. The Urus concept vehicle would evolve into the 2019 production SUV Lamborghini Urus.

== See also ==
- Lamborghini Urus (MY2019-onwards), the successor to the original Lamborghini SUV.
- Toyota Land Cruiser
- Toyota Mega Cruiser, civilian and military jeep
- Land Rover Range Rover, civilianized derivative of military jeep
- Mercedes-Benz G-Class (Geländewagen or G-Wagen), civilianized military jeep
- Hummer H1, civilianized military jeep (the Humvee)
