= Lamborghini LM003 =

Off Roader

The Lamborghini LM003 was a very short-lived offroad prototype project designed and built by Lamborghini in an attempt to meet military needs. It was virtually identical to the LM002, but instead of the V12 Lamborghini engine, it utilized a 5-cylinder, 150 bhp (112 kW), 3.6L turbocharged diesel engine provided by VM Motori. The engine was determined to be entirely insufficient to power the 2600 kg (5700 lb) vehicle and the project was abandoned.

Another model that may have been dubbed the LM003 was developed when Lamborghini was under the ownership of Megatech. They realized that the LM002 was a steady and consistent seller, so they wanted to bring it back into production with an updated design. It was to have been named the Borneo or Galileo, to differentiate it with the previous LM003. The idea was taken to SZ Design, an offshoot of Zagato, but it never went past a few concept drawings that looked vaguely similar to a modern Range Rover.
