= Lamborghini LM004 =

Prototype off-road vehicle

The Lamborghini LM004 was a prototype off-road vehicle designed and built by Lamborghini in 1984.

The LM004 was essentially a modified LM002, but in an attempt to make it appeal to a new range of customers it was outfitted with bucket seats, a phone, a refrigerator, and several other luxury features. The main change in the new vehicle was to outfit it with a new, noticeably larger, 420 bhp (313 kW), 7 L V12 engine. The engine did not perform as well as expected, and the increase in weight and size was determined to not be worth the additional development but also heavy. Only a single prototype was produced.
