= Lamborghini LMA002 =

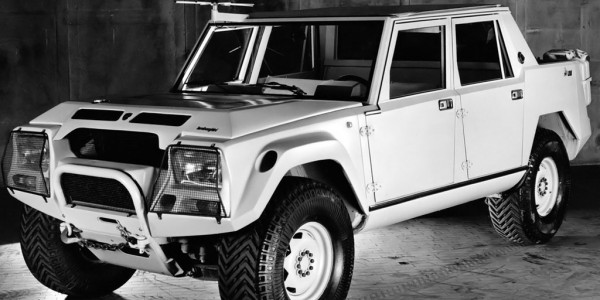

Overview
- Manufacturer: Lamborghini
- Production: 1982; 1 built
- Designer: Giulio Alfieri

Body and chassis
- Class: Concept car
- Layout: Front-engine, four-wheel-drive

Powertrain
- Engine: Lamborghini V12
- Power output: 332 bhp (248 kW; 337 PS)
- Transmission: 5-speed ZF manual

Dimensions
- Curb weight: 2,600 kg (5,732 lb)

Chronology
- Predecessor: Lamborghini LM001
- Successor: Lamborghini LM002

The Lamborghini LMA002 (Lamborghini Mimran Anteriore 002; Lamborghini, Mimran, front-engined 002) was a prototype offroad vehicle designed and built by Lamborghini while the company was headed by the then 26-year-old Patrick Mimran. It was a follow-up to the LM001 and was first presented at the 1982 Geneva Auto Show.

Finally seeing the problems with their initial designs (the Cheetah, and the LM001), Lamborghini decided to move the engine to the front. This required a redesign of the entire chassis. This was also the first time the V12 engine from the Countach was actually used in an offroad vehicle, producing 332 bhp (248 kW; 337 PS) and 314 lb⋅ft (426 N⋅m) of torque, significantly more power than its predecessors. The redesign used a tubular steel spaceframe and increased the overall weight by about 500 kg to 2,600 kg (5,732 lb). Moving the engine also freed up a large amount of space in the rear, which allowed for enough room to fit 6 more passengers, for a total of 11 occupants.

The increased weight required a suspension redesign and the addition of power steering. A five-speed transmission with a hydraulic clutch was used. Also, for the first time the four-wheel-drive capabilities could be turned off, allowing the vehicle to become only rear-wheel drive when desired. The front differential provided a maximum lock of 25 percent, while the rear and center ones could lock up to 75 percent. The center differential could also be fully locked mechanically for the severest off-roading. The body panels were all very straight and flat to facilitate the addition of armor plating, and the entire roof and doors could be removed.

At the time, it was reported that the LMA had won a competition for a Saudi military contract for between 500 and 1000 cars, with Lamborghini increasing its staffing levels by thirty percent in anticipation. This order did not materialize, and only the single LMA002 would be produced. However, after many alterations and adjustments, the design entered series production as the LM002.

== Armament ==
One photo exists of a LMA002 mounting a Oerlikon 25mm type KBA auto cannon, likely a mock-up. This specific armament was fitted on a wide array of military vehicles such as IFVs, APCs, helicopters and naval vessels. The modes of fire are semi-automatic and fully automatic at a rate of fire of 600 rounds per minute. The weapon can fire a wide array of munitions, including APDS and APFSDS rounds.
