= Bentley Bentayga =

SUV manufactured by Bentley Motors

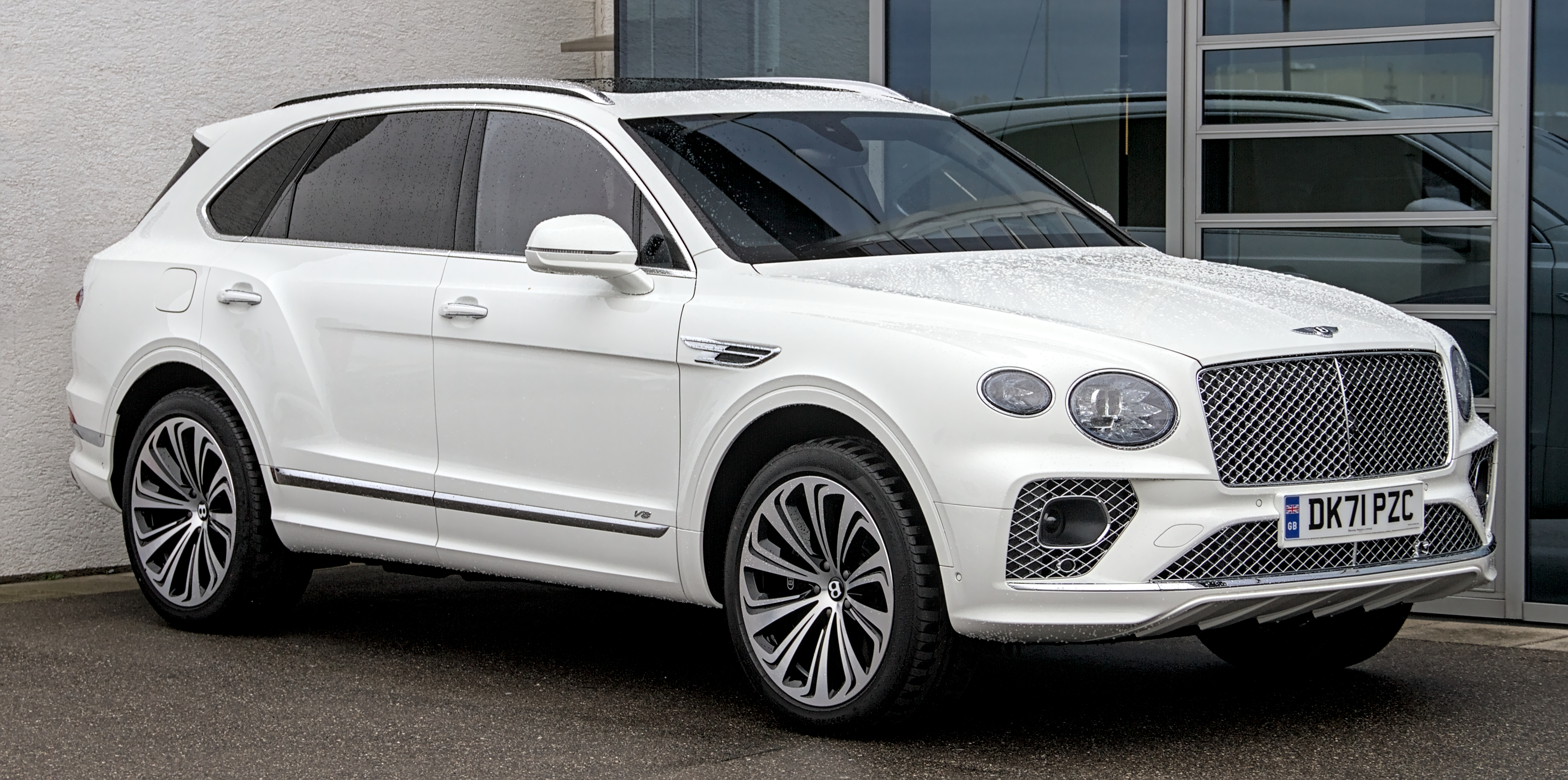
- Bentley Bentayga V8

Overview
- Manufacturer: Bentley
- Production: December 2015 – present
- Assembly: United Kingdom: Crewe (Bentley Crewe)
- Designer: SangYup Lee

Body and chassis
- Class: Mid-size/Full-size luxury crossover SUV
- Body style: 5-door 4x4
- Layout: Front-engine, four-wheel-drive
- Platform: Volkswagen Group MLB Evo
- Related: Audi Q7; Audi Q8; Lamborghini Urus; Porsche Cayenne; Volkswagen Touareg

Powertrain
- Engine: Petrol: 4.0 L EA825 twin-turbo V8; 6.0 L twin-turbo W12; Petrol plug-in hybrid: 3.0 L EA839 turbo V6; Diesel: 4.0 L twin-turbo V8
- Electric motor: 94 kW (126 hp; 128 PS) AC induction motor (PHEV)
- Transmission: 8-speed ZF 8HP90 automatic
- Hybrid drivetrain: Plug-in hybrid (PHEV)
- Battery: 17.3 kWh lithium ion (PHEV)
- Electric range: 31 mi (50 km) (PHEV)

Dimensions
- Wheelbase: 2,992 mm (117.8 in); 3,175 mm (125.0 in) (EWB)
- Length: 5,141 mm (202.4 in); 5,322 mm (209.5 in) (EWB)
- Width: 1,998 mm (78.7 in)
- Height: 1,742 mm (68.6 in)
- Kerb weight: 2,440 kg (5,379 lb)

The Bentley Bentayga is a luxury SUV produced by British marque Bentley Motors. Introduced in late 2015, it is the brand's first luxury crossover SUV. Its unibody is manufactured at the Volkswagen Zwickau-Mosel Plant in Germany, then painted and assembled at Bentley's factory in Crewe, United Kingdom.

== Concept ==
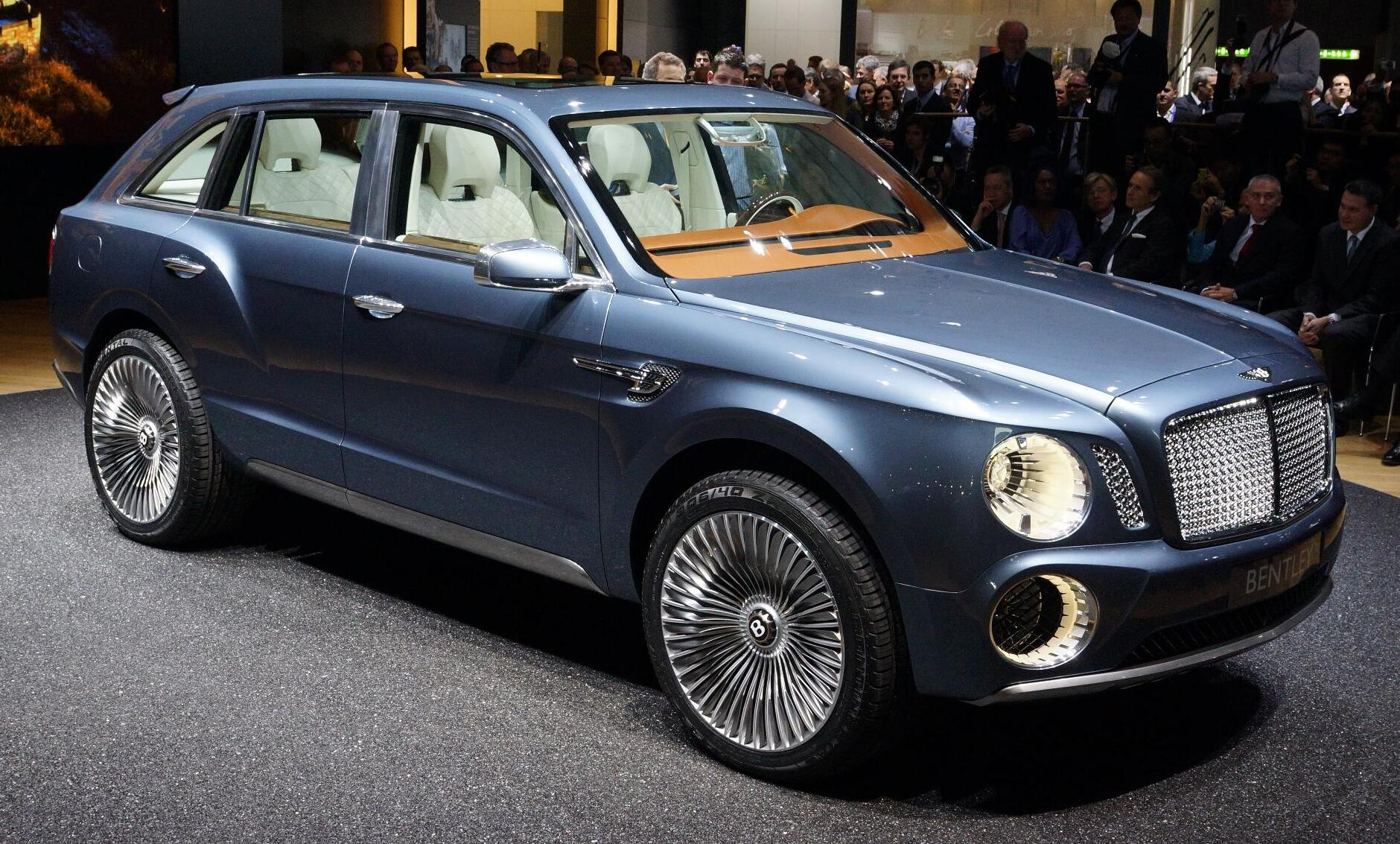
Bentley EXP 9 F concept at the 2012 Geneva Motor Show

Bentley's first SUV was previewed as the Bentley EXP 9 F concept car at the 2012 Geneva Motor Show. The concept car was based upon the Volkswagen Group MLB platform, powered by a 6.0 L W12 engine producing 600 hp (447 kW). The initial design of the EXP 9 F was redesigned to achieve "more traditional SUV proportions and less retro surfacing." An early name for the model was the Falcon.

The production version was announced in July 2013. The Bentley EXP 9 F's design received a mixed response from the motoring press. After some criticism for the design of the EXP 9 F, Bentley announced that it would change the styling for the production versions.

== Overview ==
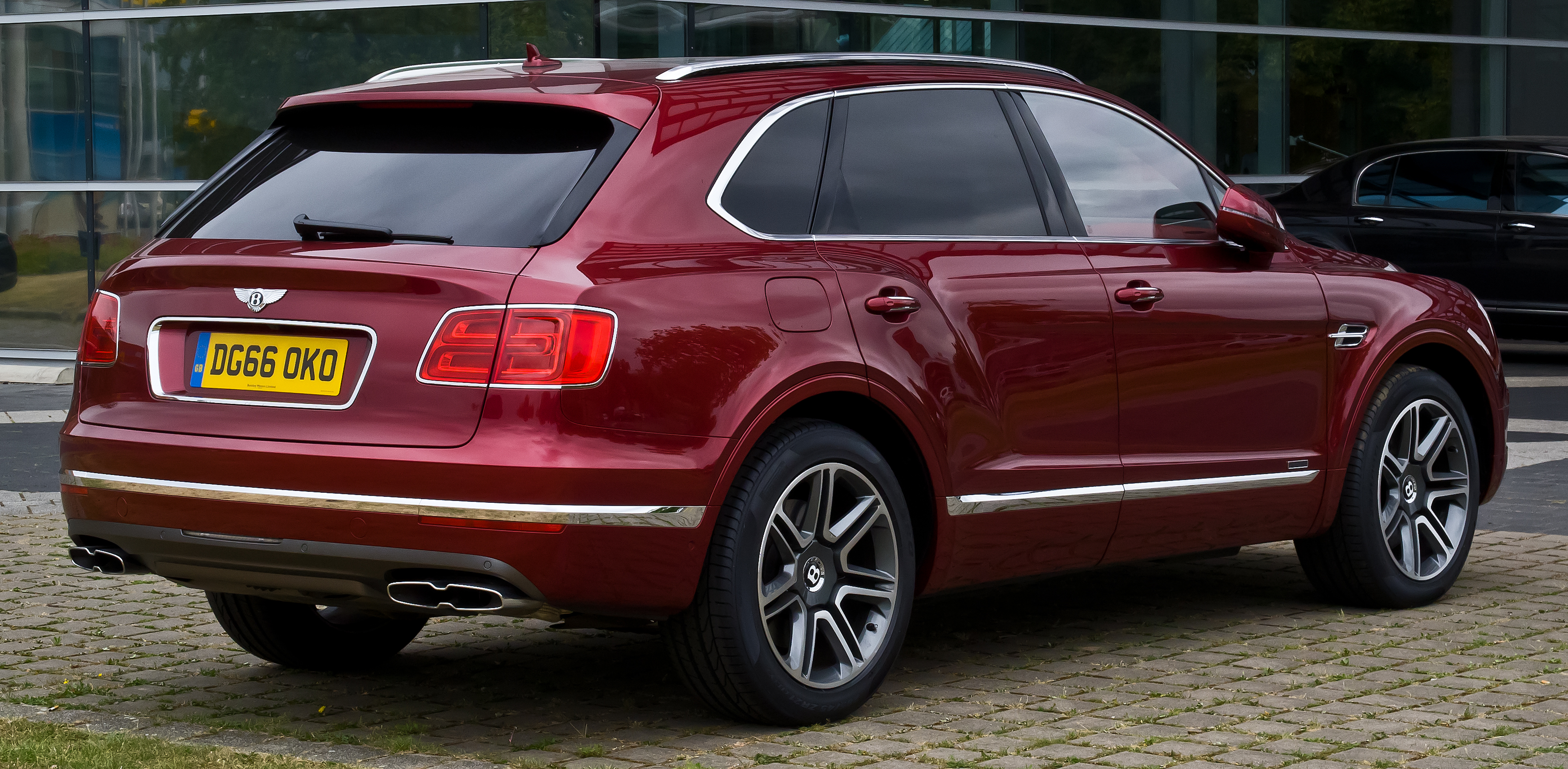
Rear view

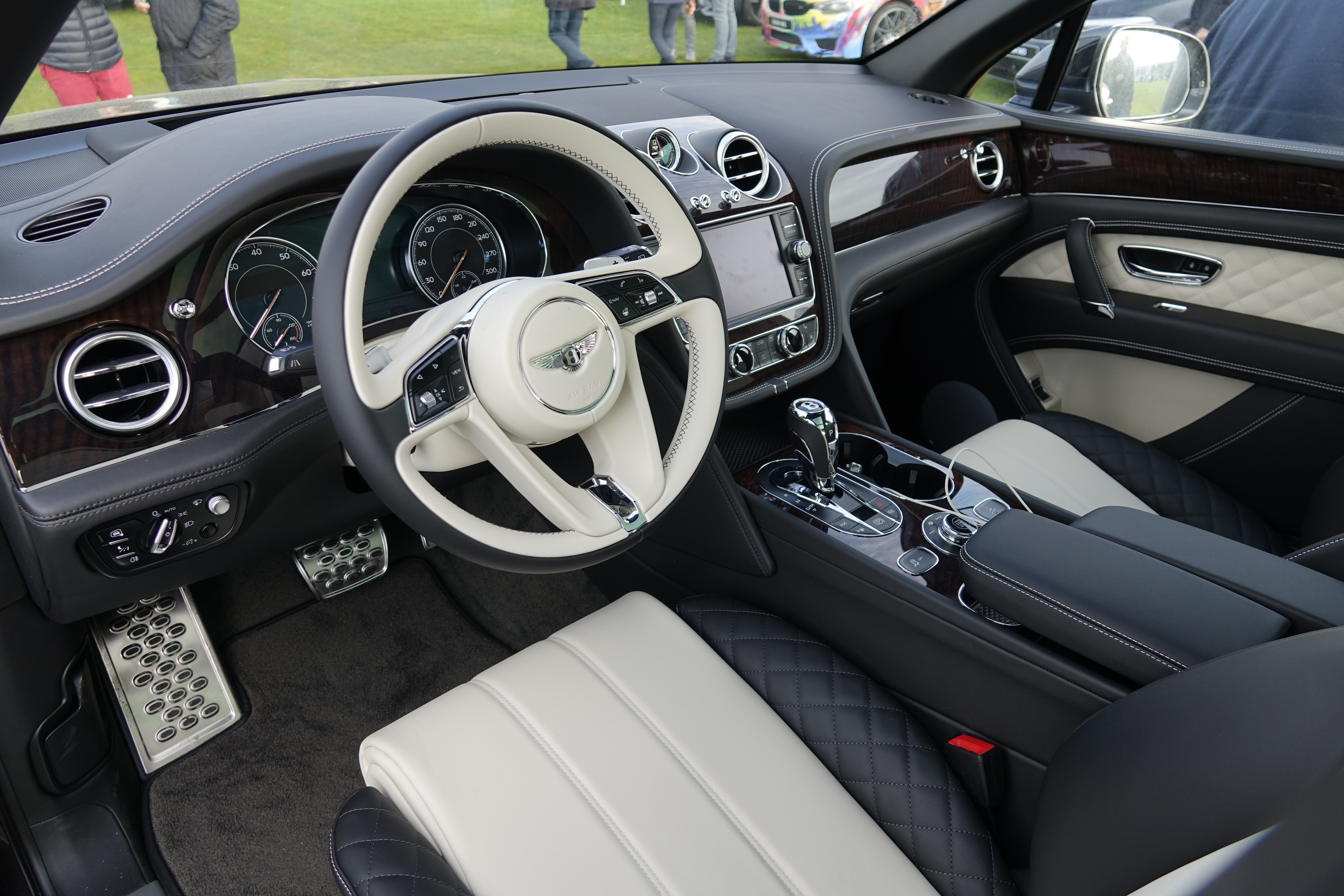
Interior

The production Bentayga debuted at the Frankfurt Motor Show in September 2015 as Bentley's first SUV. it features unibody construction and permanent all-wheel drive with a Torsen self-locking center differential and asymmetric 40/60 front-to-rear torque split, as well as Volkswagen Group's bi-turbo W12 engine and MLB platform, the latter shared with the second-generation Audi Q7 and the third-generation Porsche Cayenne, Audi Q8, and Lamborghini Urus. Available in seating configurations for four, five, or seven, at launch the Bentayga was claimed by the manufacturer as the second most expensive and fastest production SUV. It has been described by the Guardian and the Sunday Times as "huge" and by the Daily Telegraph as "gargantuan".

A total of 608 "First Edition" units (featuring the 608PS W12) were manufactured upon introduction. The original prediction for 2016 was that 3,500 Bentaygas would be sold. When the entire production volume for the year sold out in advance, production was increased and resulted in 5,586 units being sold. Despite its high price tag, the car was a sales success for Bentley in 2016 and became Bentley's most popular model. It has contributed to Bentley's increasing sales as of 2022. In 2022 about 6370 Bentley Bentaygas were sold.

Bentley revealed the name Bentayga in January 2015. The name comes from Roque Bentayga, an emblematic highland rock situated in Tejeda, Gran Canaria, the subtropical Canary Island. The company also drew inspiration from a portmanteau of Bentley and Taiga, the world's largest transcontinental snow forest, composed of the first four letters of Bentley and an altered spelling of taiga.

== Assembly ==
Originally slated by Volkswagen to be produced at the Volkswagen Bratislava Plant in Slovakia where other models based on the platform are produced, an agreement was reached with the British Government for the model to be produced at the Crewe factory. Bentley invested £800 million in a new assembly facility there and employed 1,000 new employees to support production of the new model.

Production of the Bentayga's body shell remained at the Bratislava facility, but was moved to Volkswagen's Zwickau-Mosel Plant at the end of 2016.

== Powertrains ==
=== W12 ===
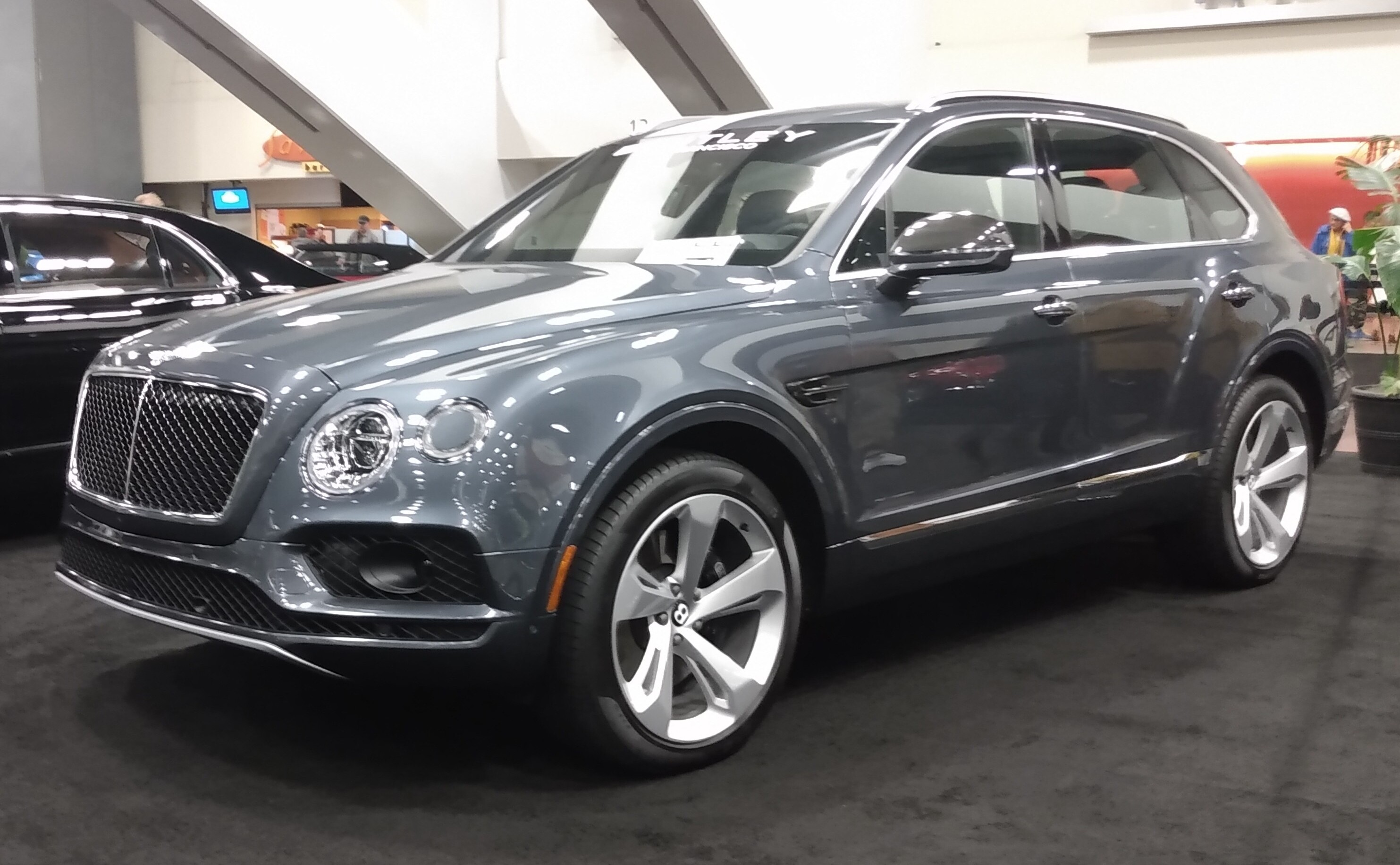
Bentley Bentayga W12

The 2016 Bentayga was launched with (and was first to receive) Bentley's new twin-turbo W12 engine. The engine was fitted with variable displacement technology and could deactivate 6 of the engine's 12 cylinders if needed. Bentley claimed the 6.0 L capable of 0–60 mph (0–97 km/h) in 4.0 seconds, 0–100 km/h (0–62 mph) in 4.1 seconds, and a top speed of 187 mph (301 km/h).

A second, more powerful version of the twin-turbo W12 was introduced for the Bentayga Speed in 2020 helping the car to achieve a claimed 0–100 km/h (0–62 mph) of 3.9 seconds.

=== Diesel V8 ===
Starting in 2017, a diesel V8 derived from the VW Group diesel V8 was available. This engine is Bentley's first diesel and only offered in the Bentayga. Included are a badge on the front wing and the trapezoid quad exhaust tips. Bentley claims performance of the 4.0 L, twin-turbo diesel of 0–60 mph (0–97 km/h) in 4.6 seconds, 0–100 km/h (0–62 mph) in 4.8 seconds, and a top speed of 168 mph (270 km/h).

=== Petrol V8 ===
A V8 petrol engine became available in 2018. Bentley claimed the 4.0 L, twin-turbo will have performance figures from 0–60 mph (0–97 km/h) in 4.4 seconds, 0–100 km/h (0–62 mph) in 4.5 seconds, and a top speed of 180 mph (290 km/h). Its combined cycle CO_{2} emissions are 272 g/km and its fuel consumption is 23.5 mpg_{‑imp} (12.0 L/100 km; 19.6 mpg_{‑US}).

=== V6 PHEV ===
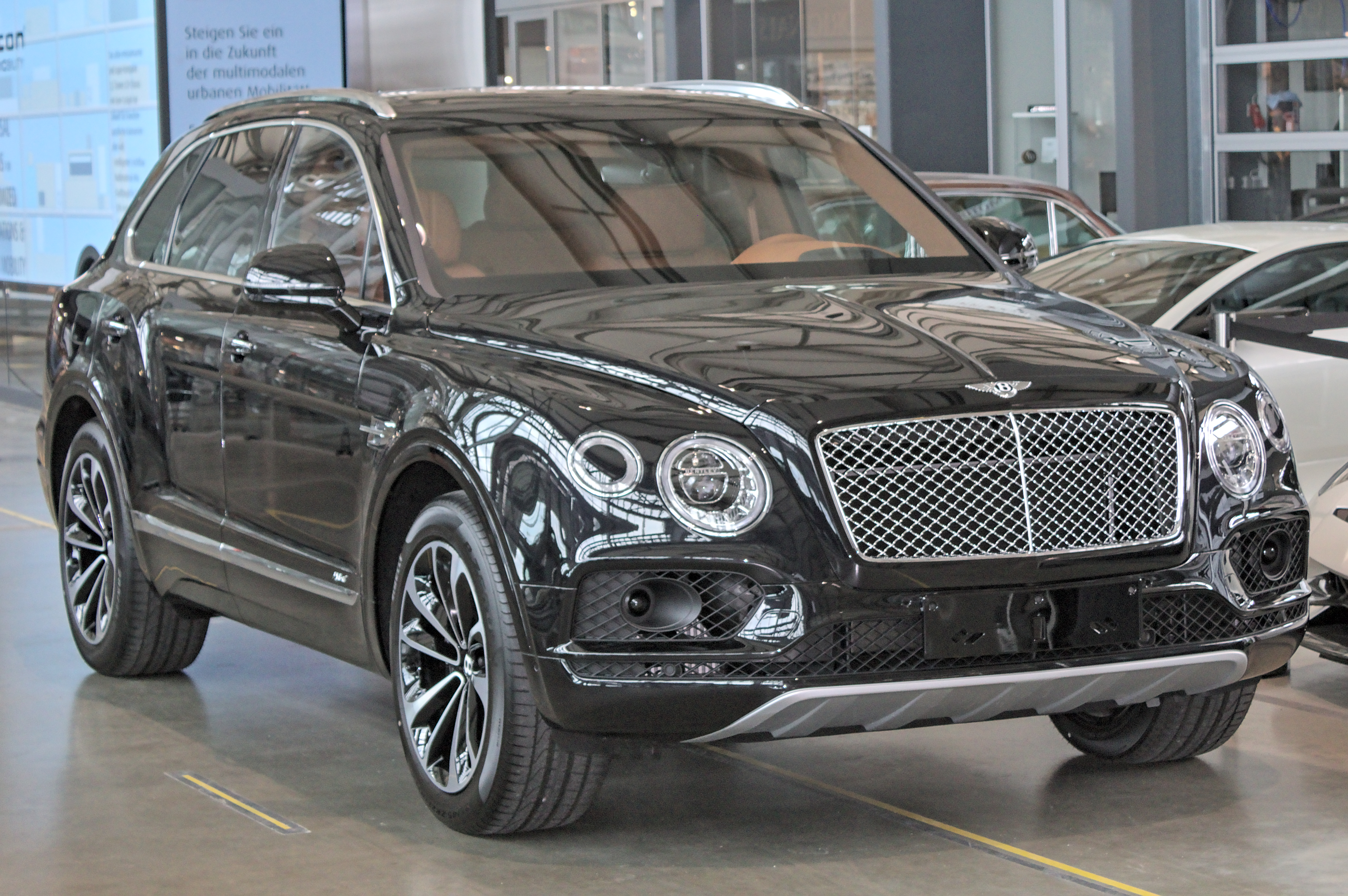
Bentley Bentayga Hybrid

A plug-in hybrid model was revealed at the 2018 Geneva Motor Show and went on sale in the UK, Europe, and North America in October 2019. It combines a 3.0 L V6 turbo petrol engine and an electric motor, for a system output of 449 PS (330 kW; 443 hp) and 700 N⋅m (516 lbf⋅ft) of torque. The 17.3 kWh (62 MJ) lithium-ion battery pack offers a range of 31.7 miles (51.0 km) as per NEDC testing.

Petrol engines
Model	Year	Engine type	Power, torque at rpm
W12	2016–2020	5,950 cc (5.95 L; 363 cu in) W12 twin turbo	608 PS (447 kW; 600 hp) at 5,000–6,000, 900 N⋅m (664 lb⋅ft) at 1,350–4,000
V8	2018–	3,956 cc (3.956 L; 241.4 cu in) V8 twin turbo	550 PS (405 kW; 542 hp) at 6,000, 770 N⋅m (568 lb⋅ft) at 1,960–4,500
Hybrid	2019–	2,984 cc (2.984 L; 182.1 cu in) PHEV V6 turbo	449 PS (330 kW; 443 hp) at 6,000, 700 N⋅m (516 lb⋅ft) at 1,100–4,500
Speed	2019–	5,950 cc (5.95 L; 363 cu in) W12 twin turbo	635 PS (467 kW; 626 hp) at 6,000, 900 N⋅m (664 lb⋅ft) at 1,350–4,000
Diesel engine
Model	Year	Engine type	Power, torque at rpm
Diesel	2017–2020	3,956 cc (3.956 L; 241.4 cu in) V8 twin turbo	435 PS (320 kW; 429 hp) at 3,750–5,000, 900 N⋅m (664 lb⋅ft) at 1,000–3,250

== 2020 facelift ==
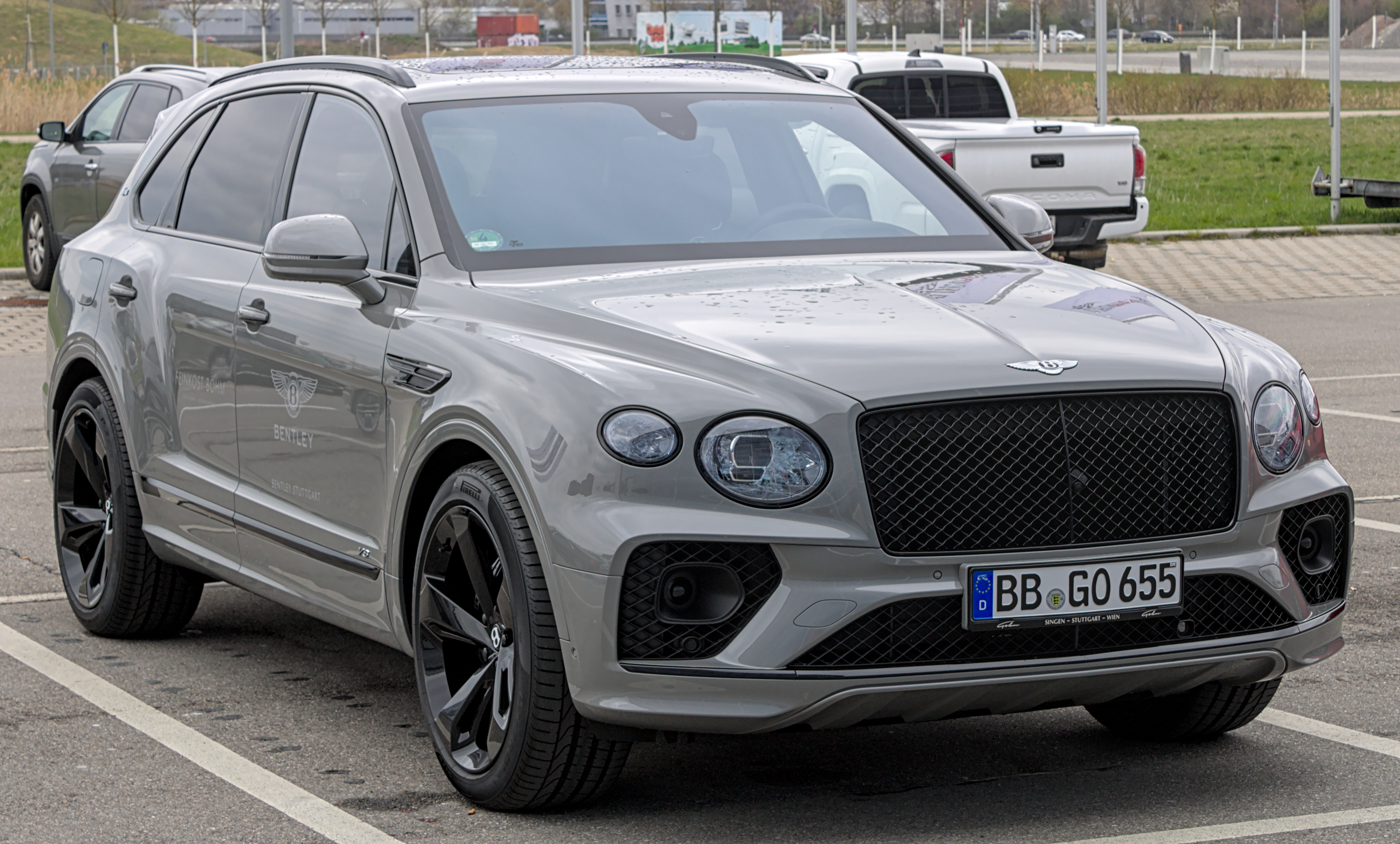

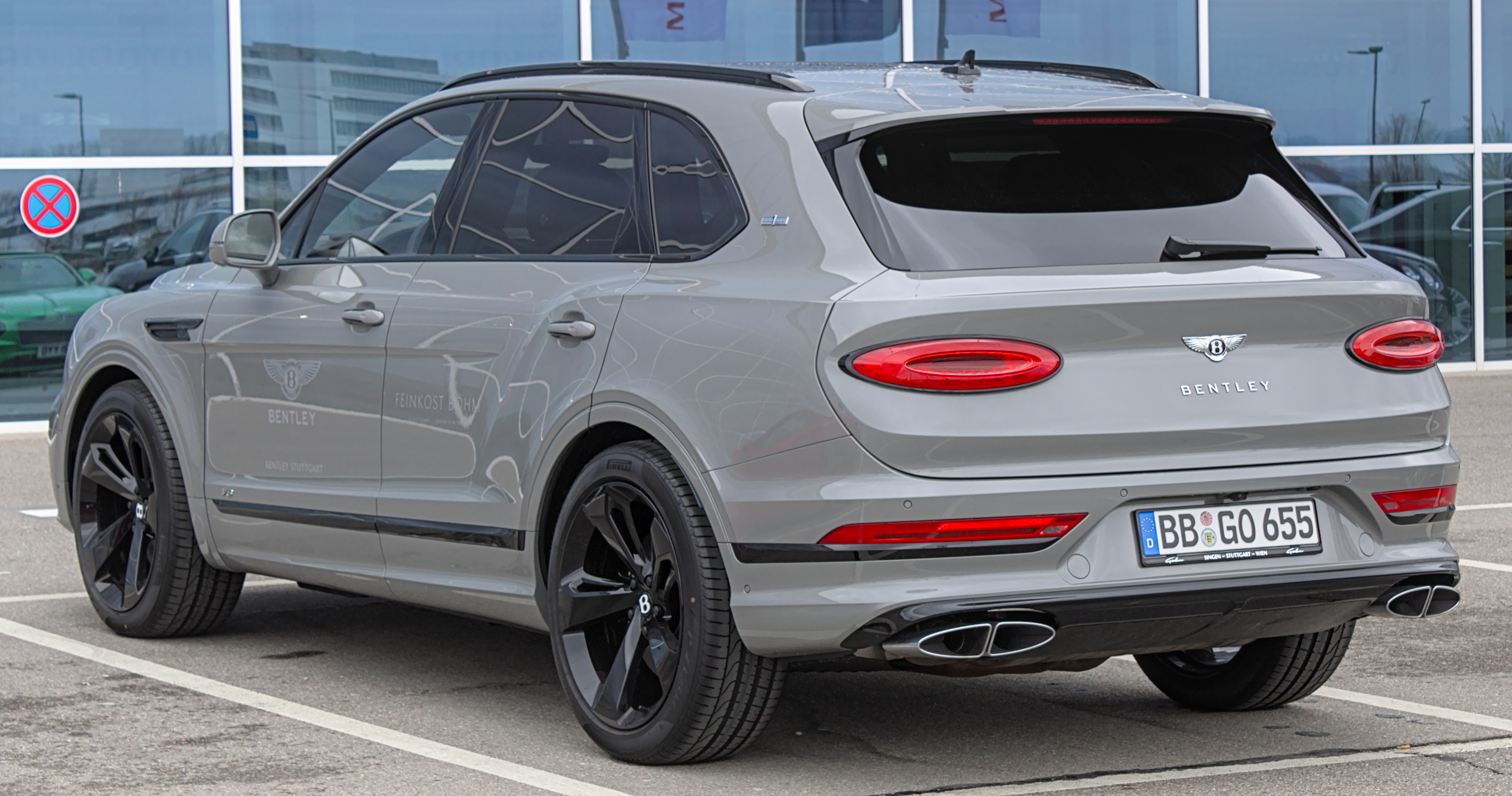
2020 facelift

The facelifted model was released in June 2020. Changes include new 3D elliptical tail-lights with animated LEDs, similar to those on the third-generation Continental GT, and a rear number plate repositioned onto the bumper to allow for ‘Bentley’ to be spelled out across the tailgate. The rear spoiler was enlarged. New side vents, a new 22 in (560 mm) wheel design, and two paint colours were added. New oval-shaped split tailpipes, heated wipers with 22 washer jets in each arm, and an optional Blackline variant with blacked-out chrome complete the external alterations.

Changes were made in the cabin, such as in the rear, where new seat frames in combination with extra reclining allow a 100 mm (3.9 in) increase in knee space. The rear seats are ventilated, and four, five, and seven seat variants are available. Rear passengers also receive an updated 5.0-in removable touchscreen tablet to control entertainment and comfort functions.

The infotainment has a new system with a higher resolution 10.9-in touchscreen. Included are Apple CarPlay and Android Auto as well as USB-C ports, air ionisers, wireless smartphone charging, and an embedded SIM card for data services. The traditional instrument dials have been replaced with a digital display (like in newer Bentleys) and the head-up display shows much more data. The audio system is a 790W, 12-speaker stereo with an optional Naim system that has 1780W and 20 speakers.

The base model features a 4.0-litre twin-turbocharged V8 engine generating 542 hp (404 kW; 550 PS). Optional is the V6 plug-in hybrid which will come to the market by late 2020. An updated Bentayga Speed was introduced in August 2020. It shares the same 6.0-litre twin-turbocharged W12 engine with the older Bentayga Speed which generates 626 hp (467 kW; 635 PS).

== Variants ==
=== Bentayga S ===
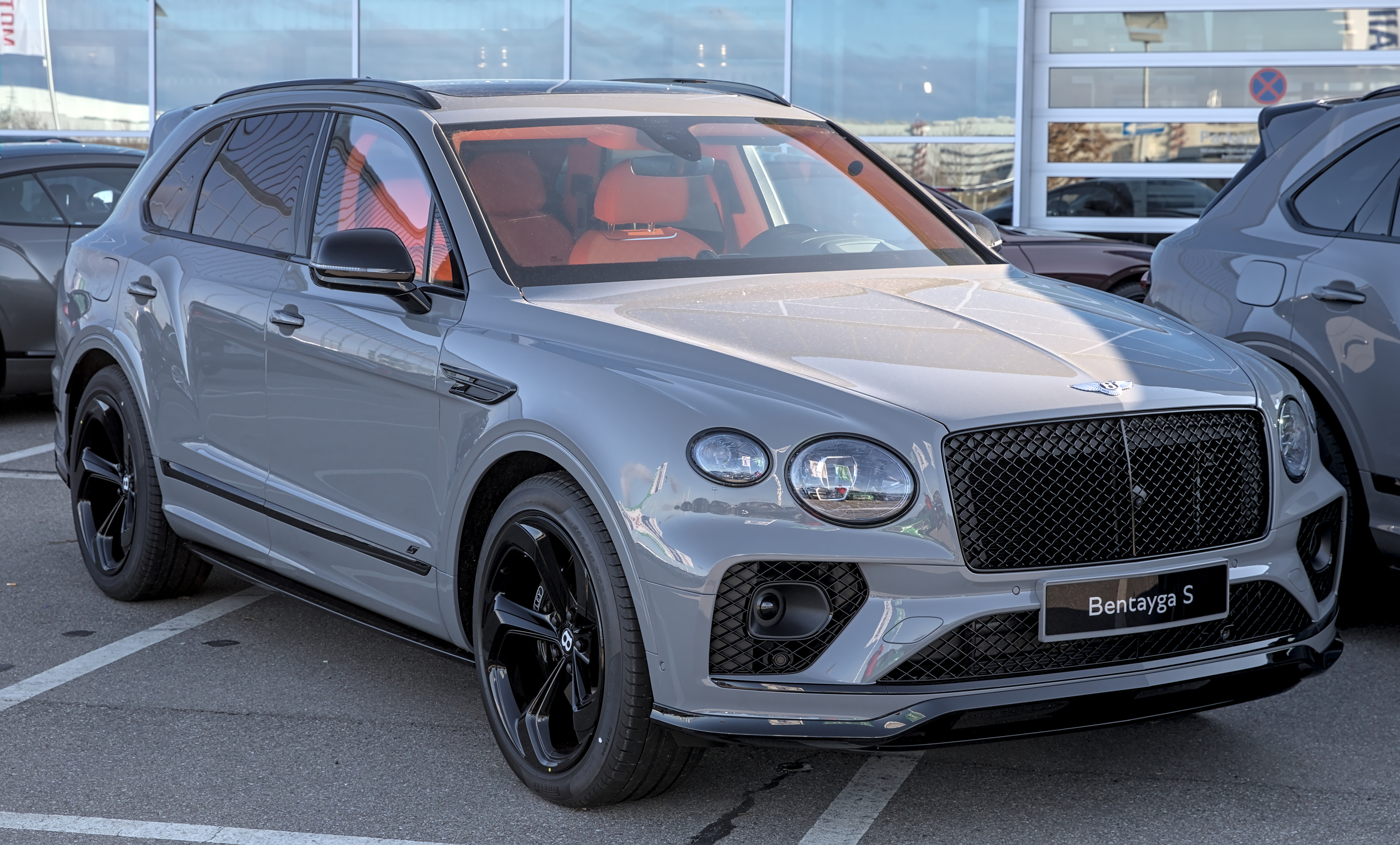
Bentley Bentayga S (V8)

In May 2021, Bentley released the Bentayga S, which is at the fourth model of the line-up, joining the plug-in hybrid, the standard V8, and the W12-powered Speed. According to Bentley, the S variant has a more "aggressively styled" design. The Bentayga S is equipped with different 22-inch wheels, a larger rear spoiler, black lower-body panels, tinted light clusters, and black oval sports exhaust.

The interior features Alcantara leather on seats, gear selector, steering wheel, headlining, and other trim elements. The chassis promises "an even more engaging drive," with 15% firmer dampers, recalibrated torque vectoring system, and Bentley's Dynamic Ride system as standard. The Bentayga S is powered by a 542 hp (404 kW; 550 PS) 4.0-litre twin-turbocharged petrol V8 engine.

=== Bentayga Azure ===
In May 2022, Bentley introduced the Azure submodel across the entire range. Aimed at providing "wellbeing" and comfort, the luxury-oriented Azure contrasts from the sportier S models. From the outside, the Bentayga Azure can be identified by Azure badging behind the front wheel, chromed grilles in the lower bumper, and a "Jewel" filler cap. Aside from special seats and suspension tuning, the Azure lineup also offers specially selected, "serene" colour schemes. Hybrid and EWB models were added later in the year.

=== Bentayga EWB ===
In May 2022, the Bentley Bentayga Extended Wheelbase, intended to replace the Bentley Mulsanne, was released. It features a V8 twin-turbo 4.0-litre engine that produces 542 hp (404 kW; 550 PS), active anti-roll bars, and rear wheel steering. The EWB is also available on the various submodles of the Bentayga, including the S, the Azure, and the Mulliner.

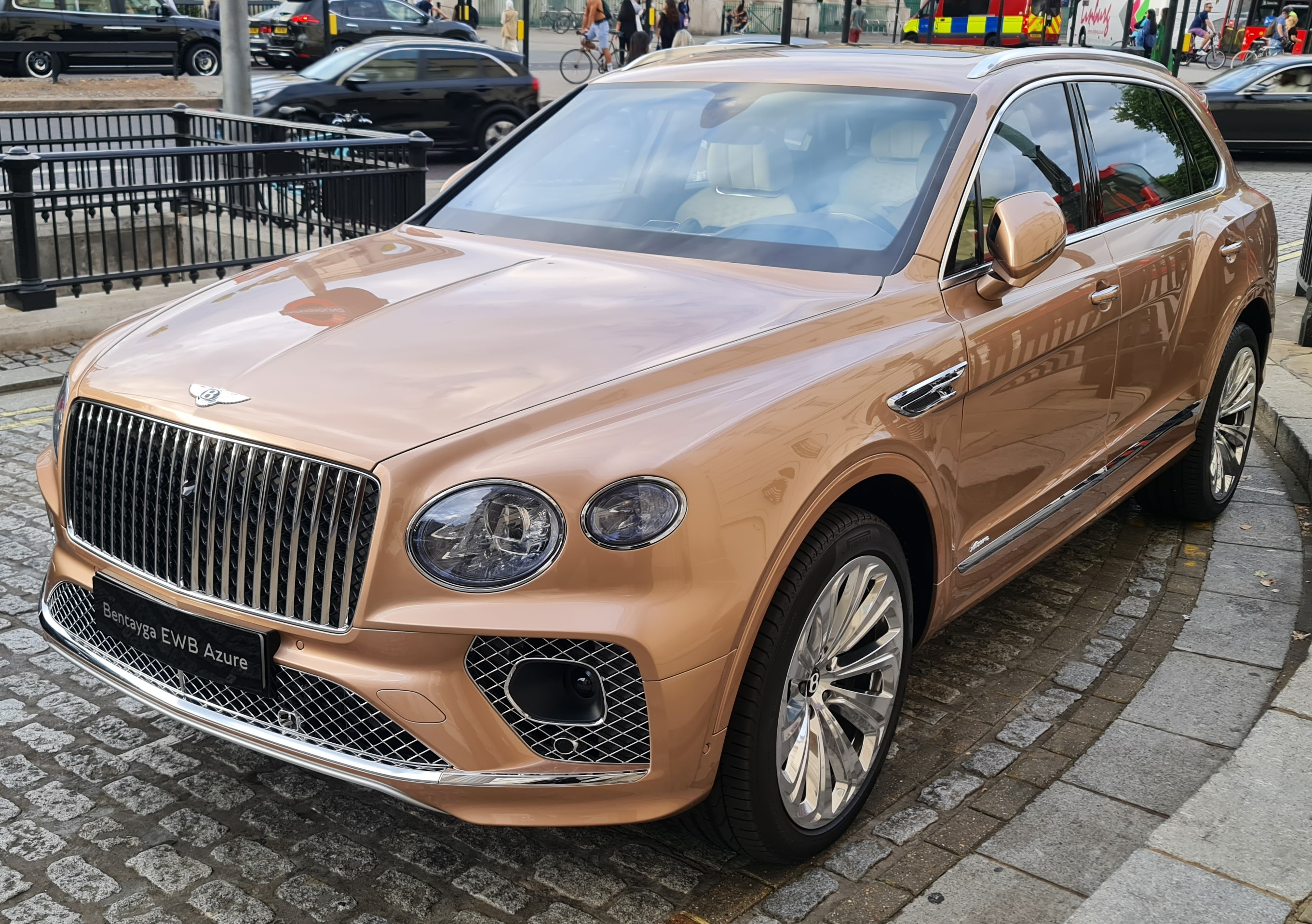
Bentayga EWB

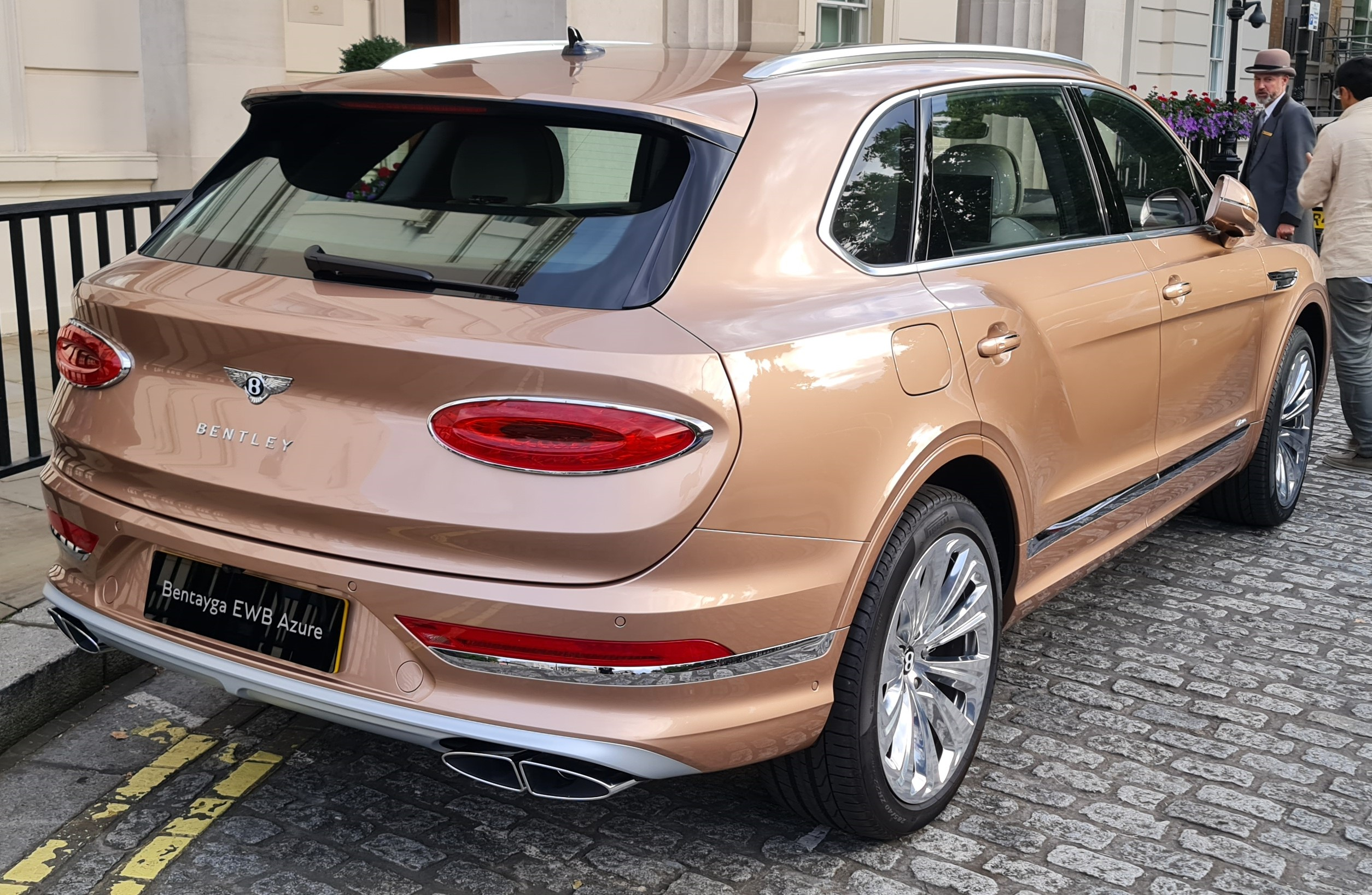
Rear view

=== Mulliner ===
Mulliner is Bentley's internal customisation company, which creates limited-edition options and accessories. Customers are able to customise the cars, including custom paint and colours as well as interior hide and carpet colours. An option is the Mulliner Tourbillon dashboard clock designed by Swiss watchmaker Breitling called Breitling for Bentley. Clock mechanism is mounted in a rotating cage that spins 3 times every 15 minutes to counteract the effects of gravity on clock precision.

== Recall ==
Bentley issued a recall for 378 cars in November 2016, as some seats of the Bentayga had not been secured properly during assembly.

== Production ==
Year	Production
2015	96
2016	5,586
2017	4,849
2018	4,072
2019	5,232
2020	3,946
2021	5,838
2022	7,346
2023	5,595
