= Lamborghini LM002 =

Off-road SUV built 1986–1993

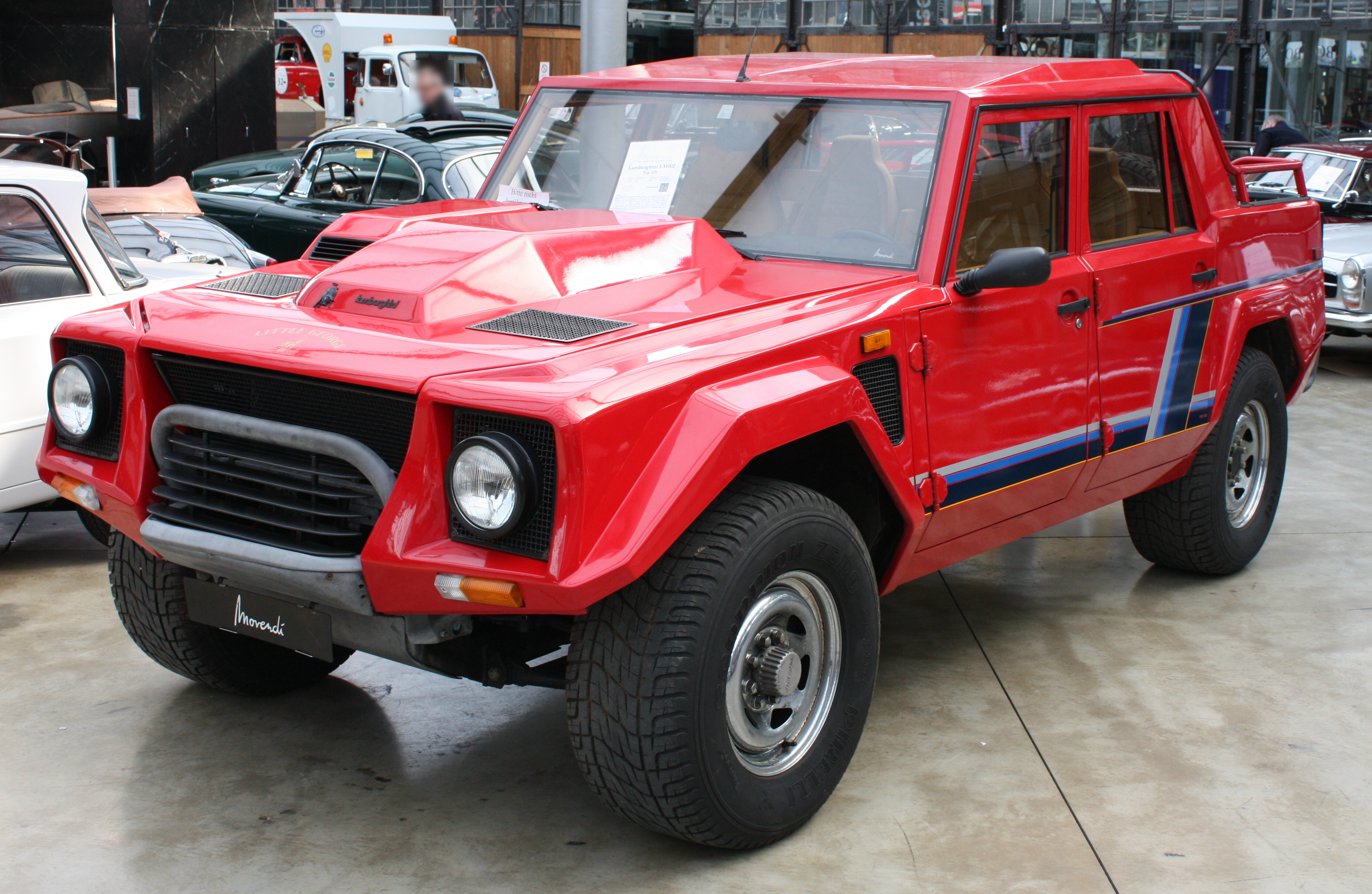
- 1988 Lamborghini LM002

Overview
- Manufacturer: Lamborghini
- Also called: Lamborghini LM/American
- Production: 1986–1993
- Assembly: Italy: Sant'Agata Bolognese
- Designer: Giulio Alfieri

Body and chassis
- Class: Light commercial vehicle
- Body style: 4-door SUV; 4-door sport utility truck
- Layout: Front-engine, four-wheel-drive
- Platform: tubular steel frame; riveted aluminium body panels
- Related: Lamborghini Countach

Powertrain
- Engine: 5.2 L (5167 cc) L503 V12; 7.2 L L804 marine V12
- Transmission: 5-speed manual

Dimensions
- Wheelbase: 2,950 mm (116.1 in)
- Length: 4,790 mm (188.6 in)
- Width: 2,000 mm (78.7 in)
- Height: 1,850 mm (72.8 in)
- Curb weight: 2,700 kg (5,952 lb)

Chronology
- Predecessor: Lamborghini Cheetah; Lamborghini LM001; Lamborghini LMA002
- Successor: Lamborghini Urus (spiritual)

The Lamborghini LM002 is an off-road vehicle manufactured by Lamborghini between 1986 and 1993. The LM002 was an unusual departure for Lamborghini which, at the time, was primarily known for high-performance, hand-built sports cars. The LM002 was not the first of its kind to be built by Lamborghini. Two prototype vehicles, the Cheetah and the LM001, paved the way for the LM002. Both vehicles used rear-mounted American power plants and were intended for military use, but were not well received. With the idea of using a front mounted Countach V12 to power the LM001 came the next model, the "LM002", which was the first of the three to see actual production by Lamborghini. The LM002 is part of the Lamborghini Militaria series of vehicles.

== History ==
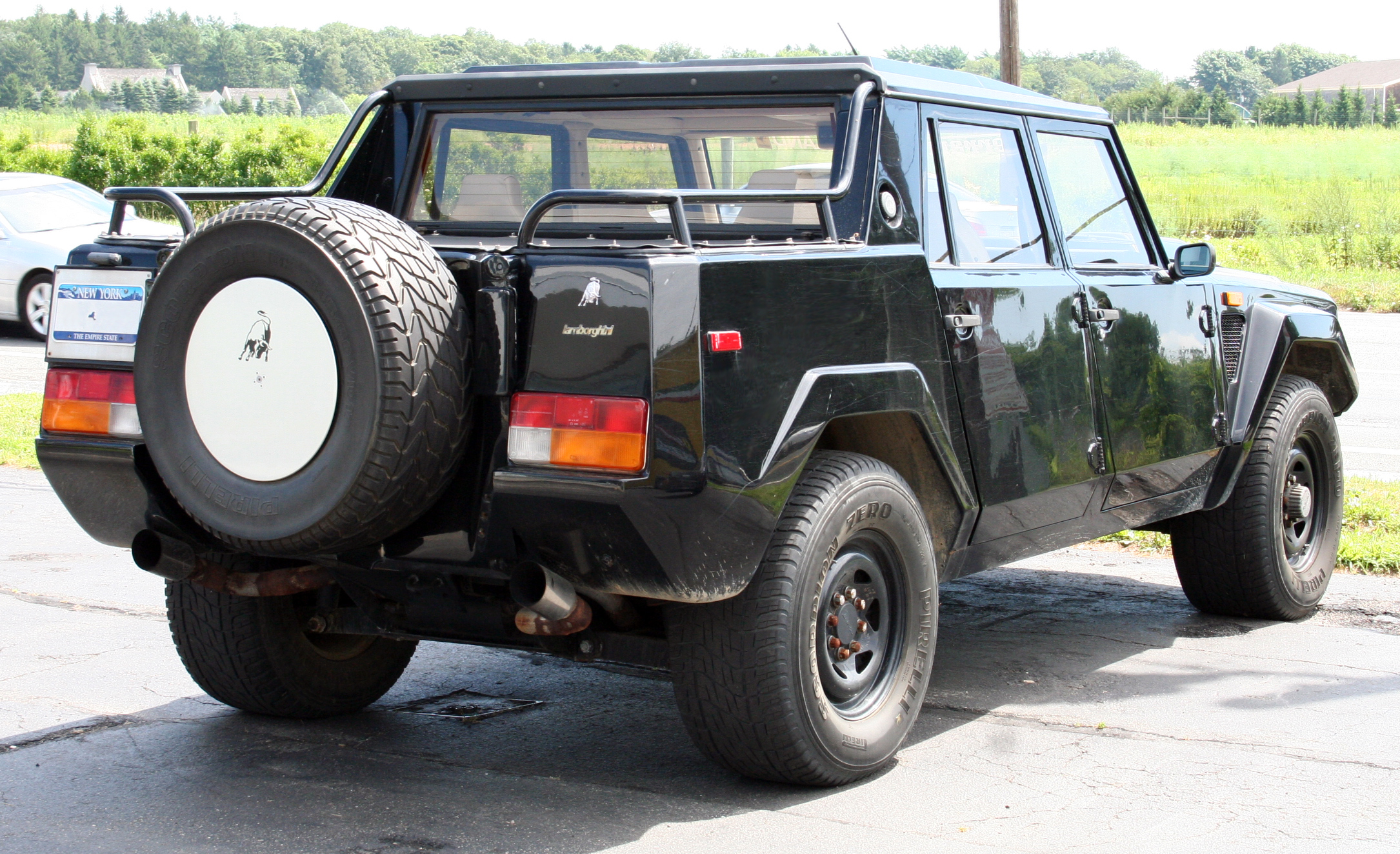
Rear view of a 1989 LM002

Lamborghini built its first military vehicle, a prototype vehicle codenamed "Cheetah", in 1977. Lamborghini had designed the vehicle with hopes of selling it to companies in the oil exploration and production industry. The original Cheetah prototype had a rear-mounted Chrysler V8 engine. The only finished prototype was never tested by the U.S. military, only demonstrated to them by its designer, Rodney Pharis. It was later sold to Teledyne Continental Motors by MTI and is apparently still in the U.S. This led Lamborghini to develop the LM001, which was very similar to the Cheetah, but had an AMC V8 engine.

It was finally determined that the engine being mounted in the rear caused too many unfavourable handling characteristics in an offroad vehicle, and the LMA002 was built with an entirely new chassis, moving the engine (now the V12 out of the Lamborghini Countach) to the front. After much testing and altering of the prototype, it was finally given a serial number and became the first LM002. The production model was unveiled at the Brussels Auto Show in 1986. It was dubbed the "Rambo-Lambo". Civilian models were outfitted with a full luxury package, including full leather trim, tinted power windows, air conditioning, and a premium stereo mounted in a roof console. In order to meet the vehicle's tire needs, Lamborghini commissioned Pirelli to create the Pirelli Scorpion tires with custom, run-flat tread designs. These were made specifically for the LM and were offered in two different tread designs, one for mixed use and the other for sand use only. These tires could be run virtually flat without risk and could handle the desert heat, the loading, and the speeds of the LM. The LM002 was fitted with a 169-litre (45 US gal) fuel tank.

=== In the market ===
A total of 301 examples were built. The last sixty were a special edition called LM/American, only sold in the United States. First shown at the 1992 Detroit Auto Show, these have OZ alloy wheels, chromed bumpers, a special interior, and various badging and trim additions. For those requiring even more power, the Lamborghini L804 type 7.2 litre marine V12, more commonly found in class 1 offshore powerboats, could be ordered. The end of production was announced in 1991; while Lamborghini claimed to have received orders for around 800 cars, the complicated manufacturing process made them discontinue the car in order to focus on more profitable models.

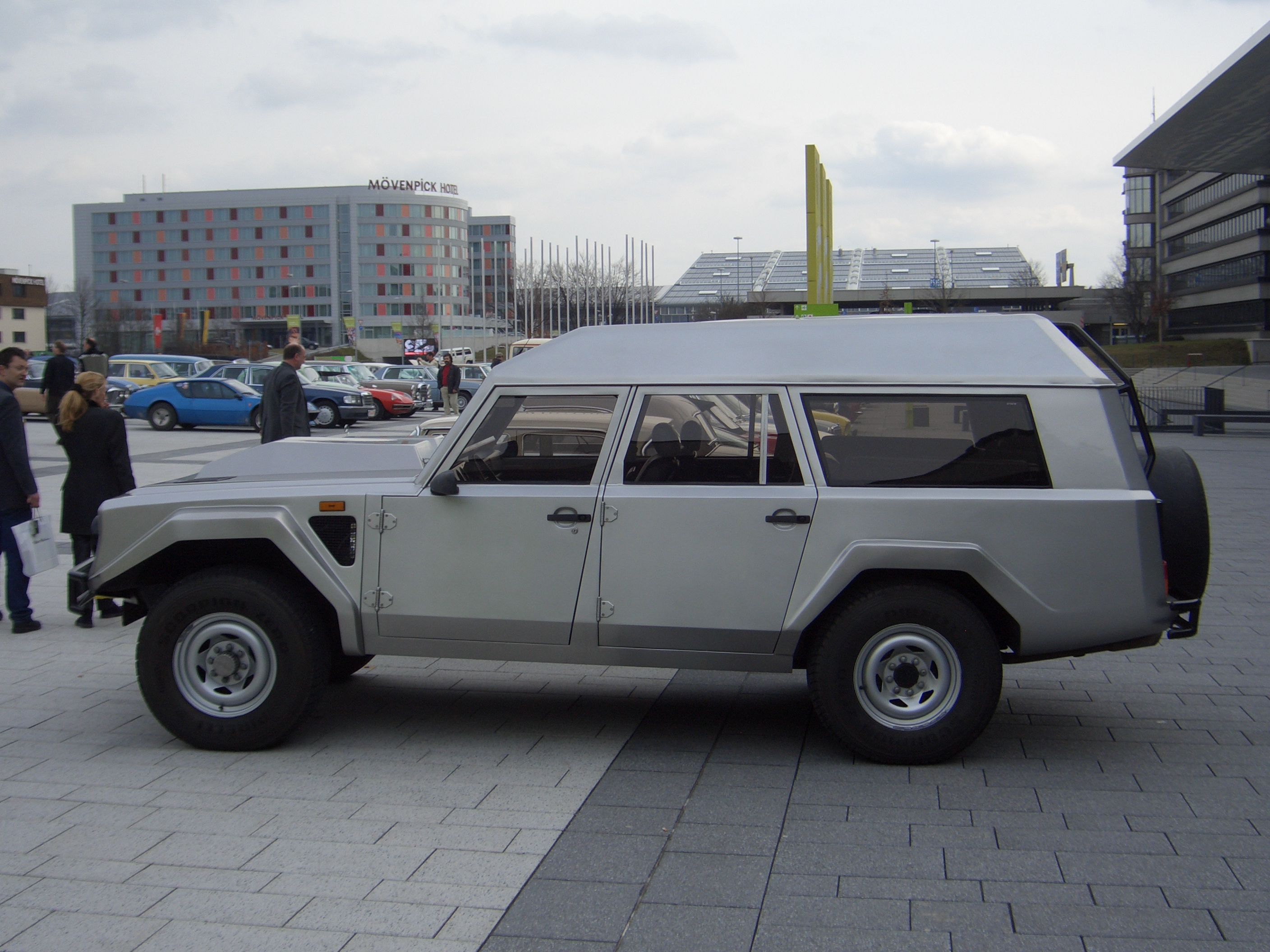
The one-off estate LM002 —made for Hassanal Bolkiah, the Sultan of Brunei

Near the end of the LM002's production, Turin-based autoshop owner Salvatore Diomante created a one-off "estate" version for the Sultan of Brunei by enclosing the back area and raising the roof. This added significant interior capacity.

Uday Hussein owned a LM002; it was blown up in 2004 by US military for an ostensible car bomb test. After the fall of Ba'athist Syria, footage emerged of a massive car collection belonging to former dictator Bashar al-Assad, stored within the Presidential Palace in Damascus; a red LM002 was briefly shown in the recording, in addition to other luxury cars such as the Ferrari F50.

An LM002 was featured in the films No Holds Barred (1989), Toys (1992) and Fast & Furious (2009), as well as the video games Stunts (1990) and Forza Horizon 4 (2018).

== Motorsport ==
LM002 Evoluzione (alias: LM002 Paris Dakar, 1988)

- Two special LM002 cars were built with the intention of making them capable of participating in the Paris Dakar Rally; one is painted white and the other is painted orange. The white one was built in 1988. Lamborghini stripped it of all unnecessary weight and gave it an upgraded suspension, engine modifications which brought it to 600 PS (441 kW), full roll cage, plexiglas windows, and GPS equipment. Funding ran out before it could officially be entered in competition, although one of them did participate in the Rallye des Pharaons in Egypt and another in Greece, both times driven by Sandro Munari. The orange car was developed by the Swiss-based World LM Racing Team.

== See also ==
- Lamborghini Urus, the successor vehicle to the LM002
- Mercedes-AMG G 65, another V-12 SUV
