= Lamborghini Urus =

SUV manufactured by Lamborghini

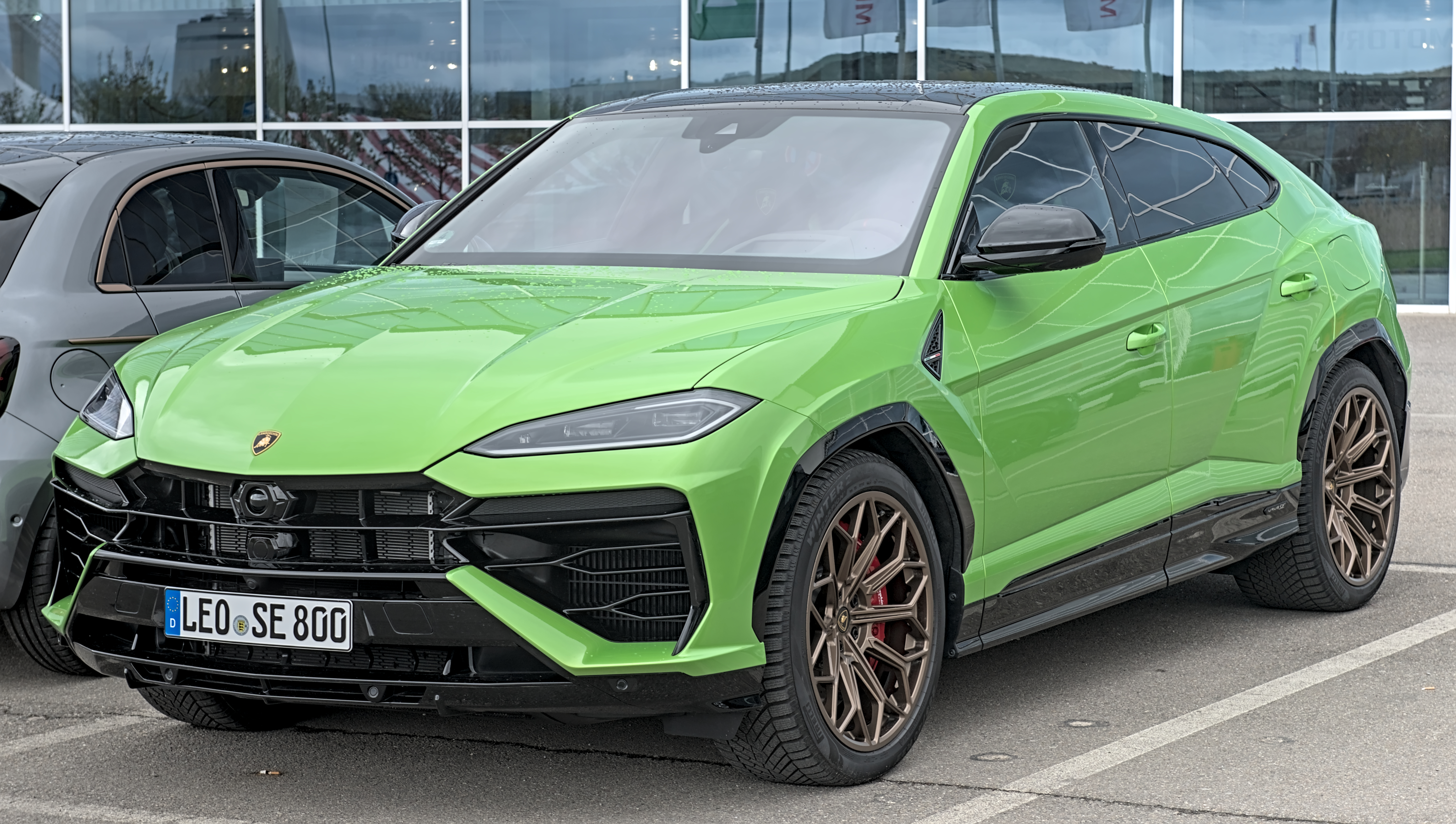

Overview
- Manufacturer: Lamborghini
- Production: 2017–present
- Model years: 2018–present
- Assembly: Italy: Sant'Agata Bolognese
- Designer: Filippo Perini (concept); Mitja Borkert (production version)

Body and chassis
- Class: Mid-size luxury crossover SUV
- Body style: 5-door SUV
- Layout: Front-engine, all-wheel-drive
- Platform: Volkswagen Group MLB Evo
- Related: Audi Q7; Audi Q8; Bentley Bentayga; Porsche Cayenne Mk3; Volkswagen Touareg

Powertrain
- Engine: Petrol: 4.0 L FSI twin-turbo V8
- Electric motor: AC Synchronus EM with PM (Urus SE)
- Power output: 478 kW (641 hp; 650 PS); 490 kW (657 hp; 666 PS) (Urus S / Urus Performante); 462 kW (620 hp; 628 PS) (Urus SE: Engine); 141 kW (189 hp; 192 PS) (Urus SE: Electric Motor); 596 kW (799 hp; 810 PS) (Urus SE: Combined Engine + Motor)
- Transmission: 8-speed ZF 8HP automatic
- Hybrid drivetrain: PHEV (Urus SE)
- Battery: Lithium-ion with prismatic cell (Urus SE)

Dimensions
- Wheelbase: 3,002 mm (118.2 in)
- Length: 5,113 mm (201.3 in)
- Width: 2,017 mm (79.4 in)
- Height: 1,638 mm (64.5 in)
- Curb weight: 2,200 kg (4,850 lb)

Logo

The Lamborghini Urus is a high performance luxury SUV manufactured by the Italian automobile manufacturer Lamborghini. It was introduced in December 2017 as a 2018 model year production vehicle. The Urus is the first Lamborghini SUV and five-door vehicle under Volkswagen's ownership, and the second SUV in its history after the LM002, produced between 1986 and 1993.

Built on the Volkswagen Group MLB Evo platform, the Urus shares many components with other Volkswagen luxury SUVs, such as the Audi Q7, Bentley Bentayga, Porsche Cayenne, and Volkswagen Touareg. With a top speed of 312 km/h (194 mph), the Urus SE is the fastest production SUV in the world.

The model's nameplate derives from urus, the ancestor of modern domestic cattle, also known as the aurochs. The Latin word urus was used for 'wild ox' from the Gallic Wars onwards.

== Overview ==
=== 2012 concept ===
The Lamborghini Urus concept was unveiled at the 2012 Beijing Auto Show on 23 April 2012. Later, the SUV was also shown at Pebble Beach in 2012. Powered by a 5.2-litre V10 engine shared with the Gallardo, the engine generated a theoretical maximum power output of 600 PS (592 hp; 441 kW) and was accompanied with an all-wheel-drive system. The sharp-lined exterior design of the SUV takes heavy influence from the company's V12 flagship, the Aventador.

Previously, Lamborghini had trademarked the name "Urus" before the introduction of the Lamborghini Estoque at the 2008 Paris Motor Show, and automotive news blogs Jalopnik and Autoblog believed that the name would be applied to what was eventually found to be the Estoque.

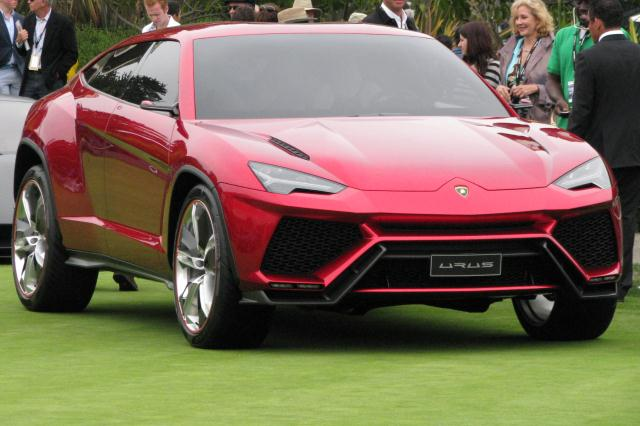
Urus concept

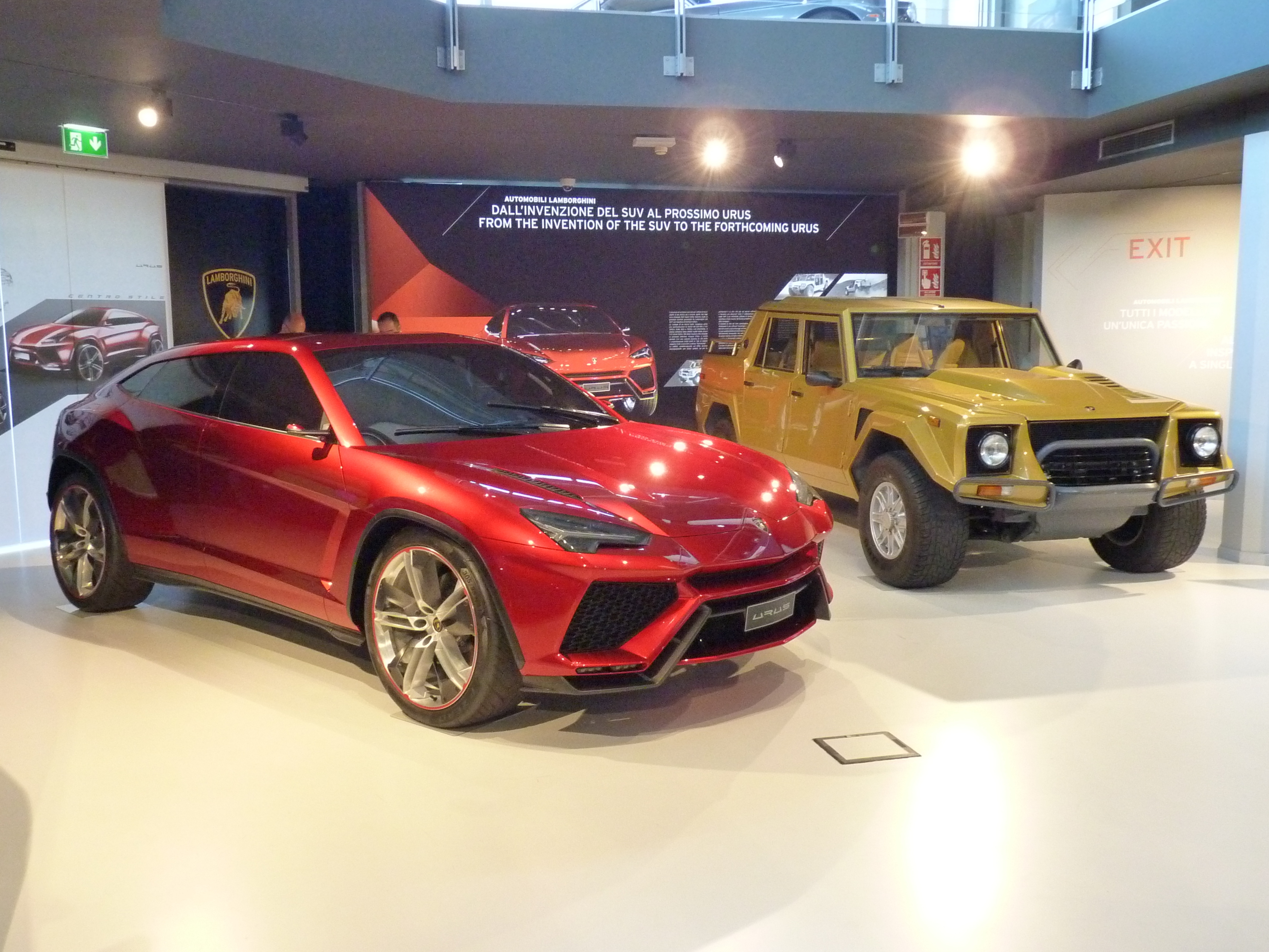
Urus Concept alongside the Lamborghini LM002

=== Release ===
On 4 December 2017, the Urus was unveiled at Lamborghini's Sant'Agata Bolognese headquarters, making it the brand's first SUV since the LM002. The production version of the SUV received major changes to the exterior and featured a different powertrain than that of the concept. Production of the new Urus started at Lamborghini's refreshed Sant'Agata facility, ahead of first deliveries in early 2018 with a targeted sales volume of around 3,500 a year. However, Lamborghini had to expand their factory in Sant'Agata Bolognese to meet the higher demand.

In July 2020, the company announced the 10,000th unit of the Urus. In 2022, Lamborghini hit a major milestone, having produced 20,000 of these SUVs, which made the Urus the company's best-selling model in the shortest time.

== Specifications and performance ==
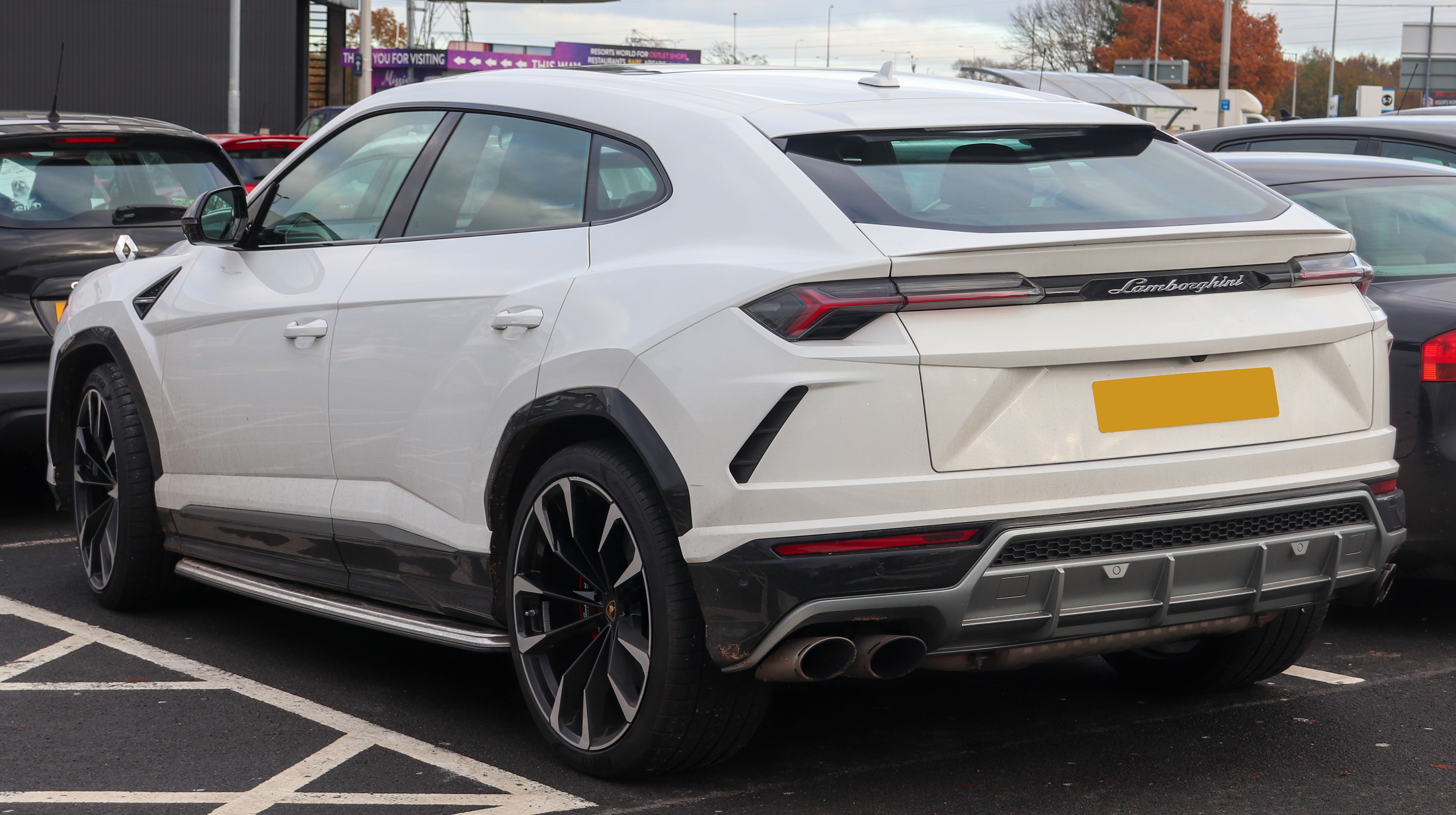
Lamborghini Urus (rear)

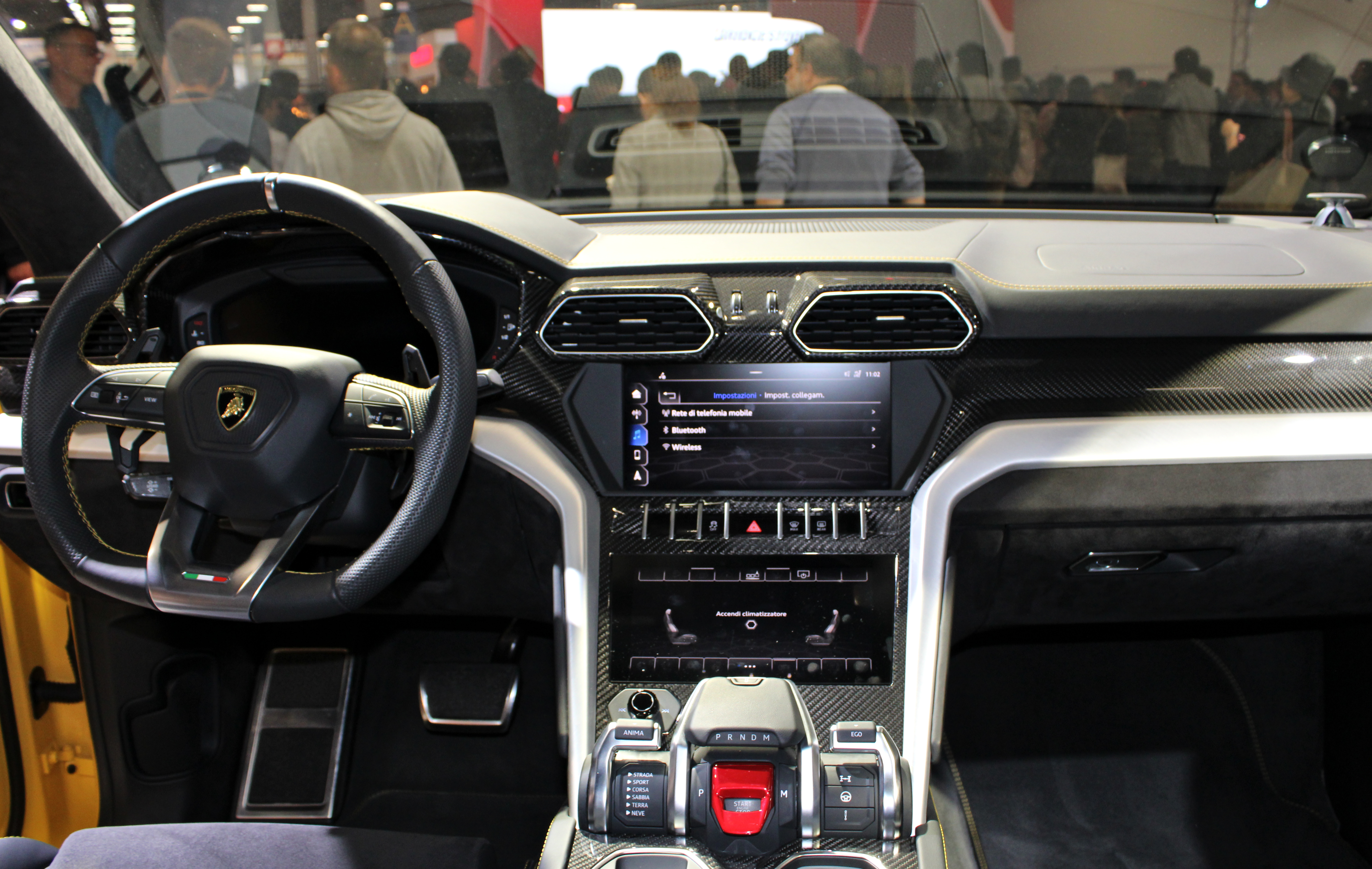
Interior

The Lamborghini Urus is significantly lighter than many of its competitors (i.e. the BMW X6 M, Bentley Bentayga and Rolls-Royce Cullinan, but not the Porsche Cayenne) at less than 2,200 kg (4,850 lb) as quoted by the manufacturer mainly because of the extensive usage of carbon fibre reinforced polymer, despite using the same platform as the Audi Q7, Bentley Bentayga, Porsche Cayenne, and Volkswagen Touareg.

The Urus has a front-engine, all-wheel-drive layout, and a top speed of 305 km/h (190 mph) making it one of the world's fastest production SUVs. The Urus can accelerate from 0–100 km/h (62 mph) in 3.6 seconds and 0–200 km/h (124 mph) in 12.8 seconds.

Lamborghini has developed the world's largest set of carbon ceramic disc brakes for the Urus at the time of its release, with 440 mm (17.32 in) discs in the front and 370 mm (14.57 in) discs in the rear using ten-piston callipers at the front and single-piston calipers at the rear. The all-wheel drive system of the Urus under normal driving sends 40 percent of the available torque to the front wheels and 60 percent to the rear wheels. It also uses torque vectoring to send as much as 70 percent to the front or 87 percent to the rear, when necessary. The SUV also features rear-wheel steering and an air suspension system that can provide a maximum of 250 mm (9.8 in) of ground clearance for off-road use. The SUV is available with an optional off-road package, which includes modified front and rear bumpers that are better suited to the task.

An unadorned Urus comes standard with a turbocharged 4.0-litre V8, an eight-speed ZF 8HP automatic transmission, all-wheel drive, 21-inch wheels, carbon-ceramic brakes, a rear-axle torque-vectoring system, and four-wheel steering. On the inside, the Urus comes with a simulated suede headliner and leather seating surfaces. The front seats feature 12-way power adjustment, position memory, seat heating, and a 12.3-inch digital instrument panel. The rear seats can be configured as either a three-person bench or two-person sport seats, and four-zone automatic climate control is standard.

The Urus, like all of Lamborghini's current offerings, features a selection of driving modes, which adapt the suspension to improve the car's performance in various driving conditions. The Lamborghini Urus features Strada (street), Sport, Corsa (track), Terra (dirt), Sabbia (sand), and Neve (snow) driving modes, with the latter three possibly only available on the off-road package offered. The Urus has a seating capacity of four to five people.

=== Powertrain ===
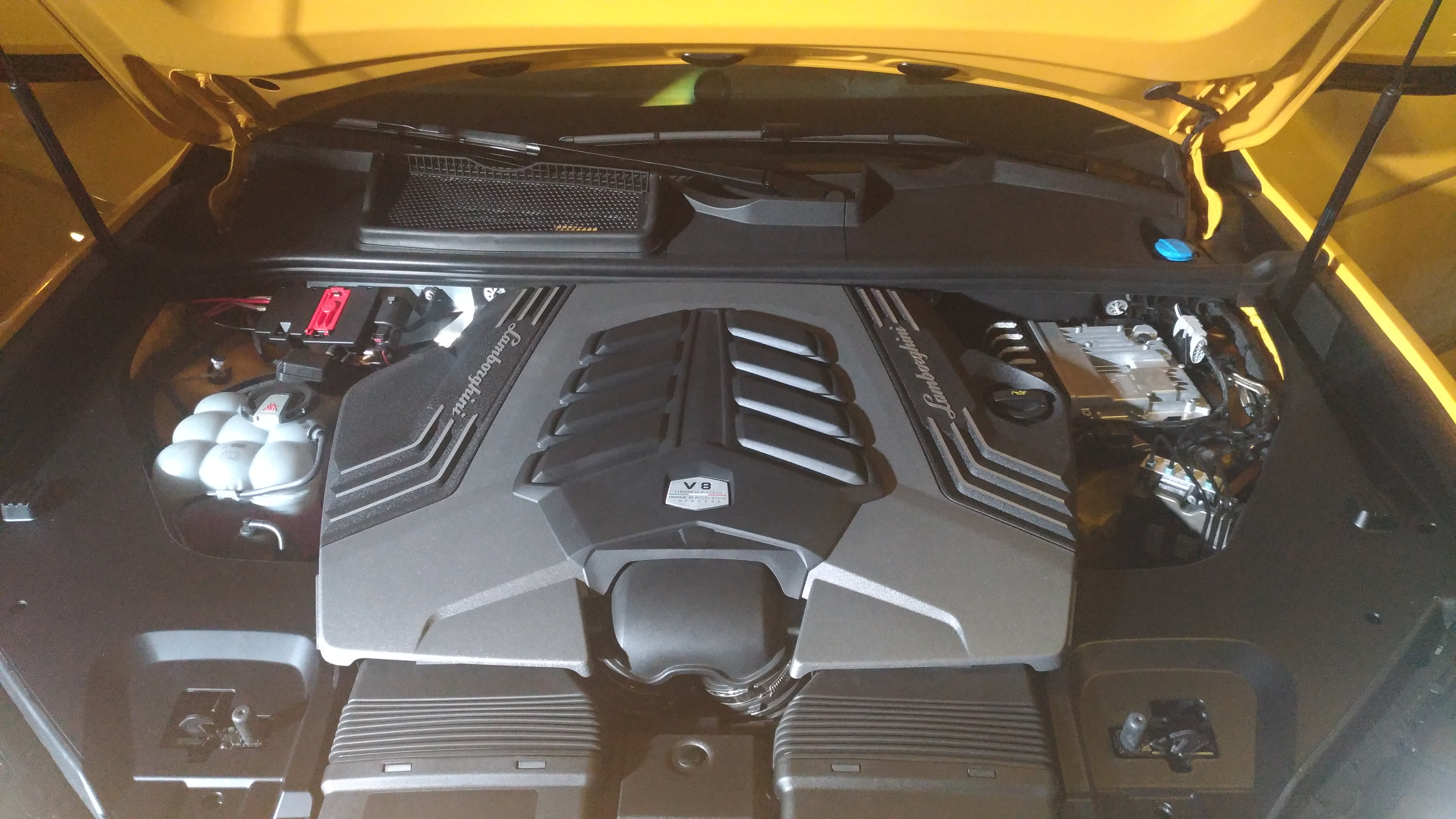
The 4.0-litre twin-turbo V8 engine

The Urus does not use Lamborghini's hallmark of naturally aspirated V10 (as used in the concept) or V12 engines. Instead, the Urus is powered by a 4.0-litre twin-turbocharged V8, a modified version of Audi's 4.0-litre V8. The engine is rated at a maximum power output of 478 kW (641 hp; 650 PS) at 6,000 rpm and maximum torque of 850 N⋅m (627 lb⋅ft) at 2,250–4,500 rpm. The engine has been heavily reworked for the Urus, and is uprated by 100 PS (74 kW; 99 hp) and 80 N⋅m (59 lbf⋅ft) of torque more than the Cayenne Turbo, with changes such as new cylinder heads. The engine is assembled at a Volkswagen plant in Hungary and is shipped to Lamborghini's assembly plant.

The Urus accelerates from 0 to 62 mph (100 km/h) in 3.6 seconds and reaches a top speed of 190 mph (306 km/h). The EPA fuel economy is rated at 14 mpg_{‑US} (16.8 L/100 km; 16.8 mpg_{‑imp}) combined (city and highway), 12 mpg_{‑US} (19.6 L/100 km; 14.4 mpg_{‑imp}) city, and 17 mpg_{‑US} (13.8 L/100 km; 20.4 mpg_{‑imp}) highway.

== Special variants ==
=== Urus Pearl Capsule ===
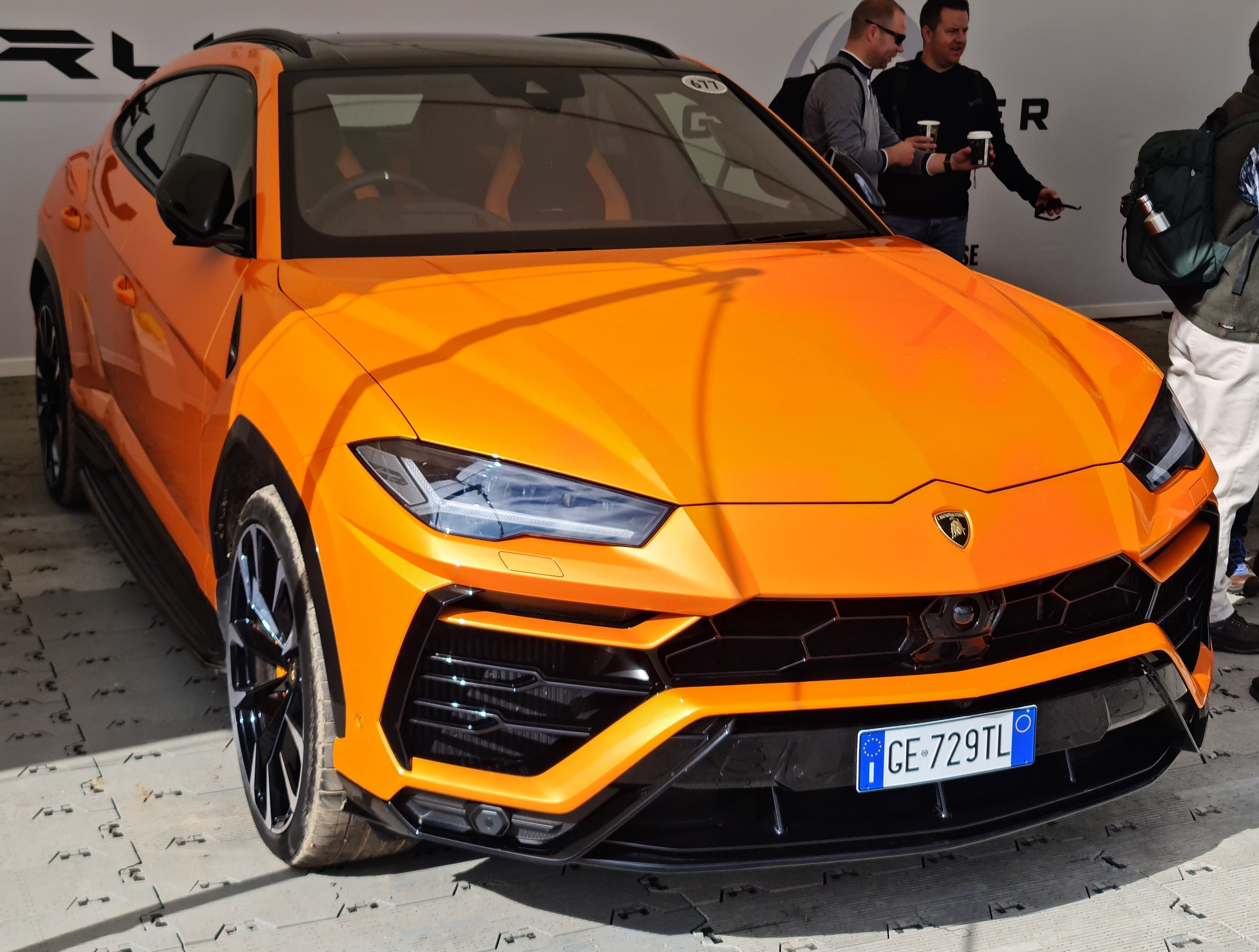
Lamborghini Urus Pearl Capsule at the 2021 Goodwood Festival of Speed

The Urus Pearl Capsule is a variant of the standard Urus. Customers who buy the Urus Pearl Capsule can customize it to the fullest, with options including being able to choose the colours for two-tone Alcantara seats, to the paint colours. Lamborghini states that there are three pearl paint options available—Verde Mantis, Arancio Borealis and Giallo Inti—providing a modern interpretation of the original solid colours united with Lamborghini tradition. The Black Gloss is painted lower bumpers, rocker covers and roof to create a two-tone effect, while the 23-inch Taigete alloy wheels in Shiny Black match the colour accents chosen. Technical specifications of the Urus Pearl Capsule such as power and torque remain the same as the standard Urus.

=== Urus ST-X ===
The Urus ST-X is a racing, non-street-legal variant of the standard Urus, built by the Squadra Corse Division of Lamborghini. The concept was unveiled in 2018, at the Lamborghini World Finals. Designed to meet FIA regulations, the production ST-X features a full roll-cage, fire suppression system, and an FT3 fuel tank. The air intakes have been enlarged to better optimize the heat exchange of the 4.0-litre twin-turbo V8. Power and torque remain the same as the street-legal Urus, with the same 641 hp (650 PS; 478 kW) and 850 N⋅m (627 lb⋅ft) of torque. The car has hexagonal racing exhausts, and 21-inch alloy wheels fitted with Pirelli tires. These changes give a 25% weight reduction compared to the street-legal car. Customer deliveries are scheduled for 2020.

=== Urus Performante (2022) ===
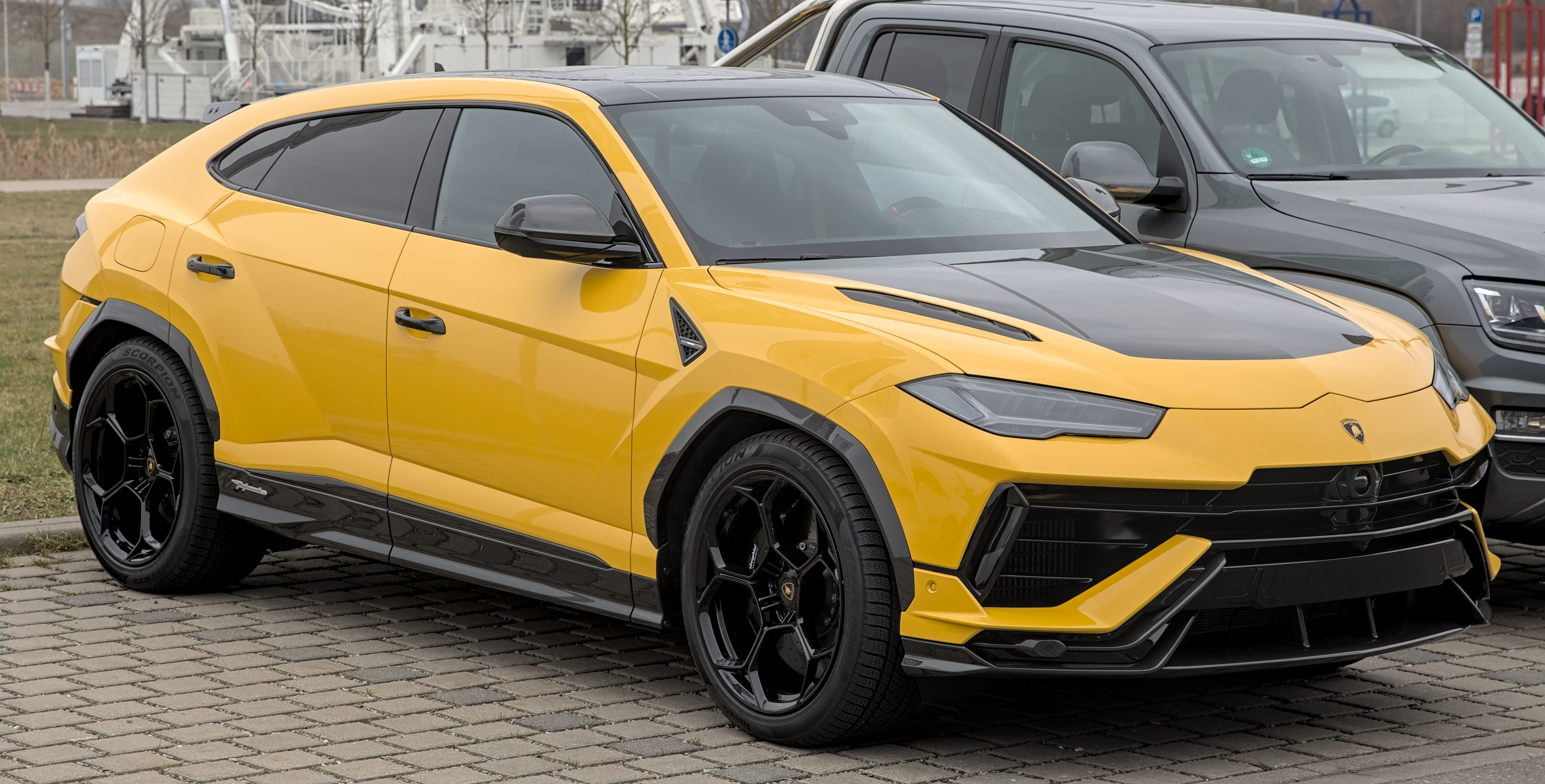
Lamborghini Urus Performante

The Urus Performante was unveiled by Lamborghini in August 2022 as a more powerful variant of the Urus. Unlike other special variants, the Performante saw a significant change in design and performance specifications. The engine is upgraded to produce 657 hp (666 PS; 490 kW), with torque remaining unchanged, and it comes with improved downforce, while being 104 lb (47 kg) lighter than other variants. Lamborghini claims a 0–100 km/h (62 mph) time of 3.3 seconds and a top speed of 306 km/h (190 mph). Other changes include retuned suspension, a more rear biased center differential, removal of the height adjustable air springs in favor of fixed height coil springs, removal of the off-road drive modes, and optional Pirelli P Zero Trofeo R tires.

=== Urus Performante Polizia (2023) ===
In December 2023, Lamborghini delivered a Lamborghini Urus Performante to the Italian State Police in Piazza del Viminale in Rome, in the presence of Prime Minister Giorgia Meloni, Interior Minister Matteo Piantedosi, and Police Chief Vittorio Pisani.

=== Urus SE ===
The SE, revealed in April 2024, features a general restyling of the exterior. The major mechanical milestone for this version is its new plug-in hybrid powertrain. It pairs a reworked 4.0-litre twin-turbo V8 engine, which produces 462 kW (620 hp; 628 PS) and 800 N⋅m (590 lb⋅ft) of torque on its own, with a permanent-magnet electric motor integrated into the 8-speed automatic transmission. The electric motor contributes an additional 141 kW (189 hp; 192 PS) and 483 N⋅m (356 lb⋅ft) of torque.

Combined, the hybrid system delivers a total power output of 596 kW (799 hp; 810 PS) and 950 N⋅m (701 lb⋅ft) of torque. Despite a curb weight increase of roughly 300 kg (661 lb) over the standard Urus S due to the 25.9 kWh lithium-ion battery pack, the hybrid drivetrain drops the 0 to 100 km/h acceleration time down to 3.4 seconds, achieving a top speed of 312 km/h (194 mph), making it the fastest production SUV in the world at launch.

According to Lamborghini, the plug-in hybrid architecture cuts regulated tailpipe emissions by up to 80% compared to older, purely internal combustion versions of the vehicle.

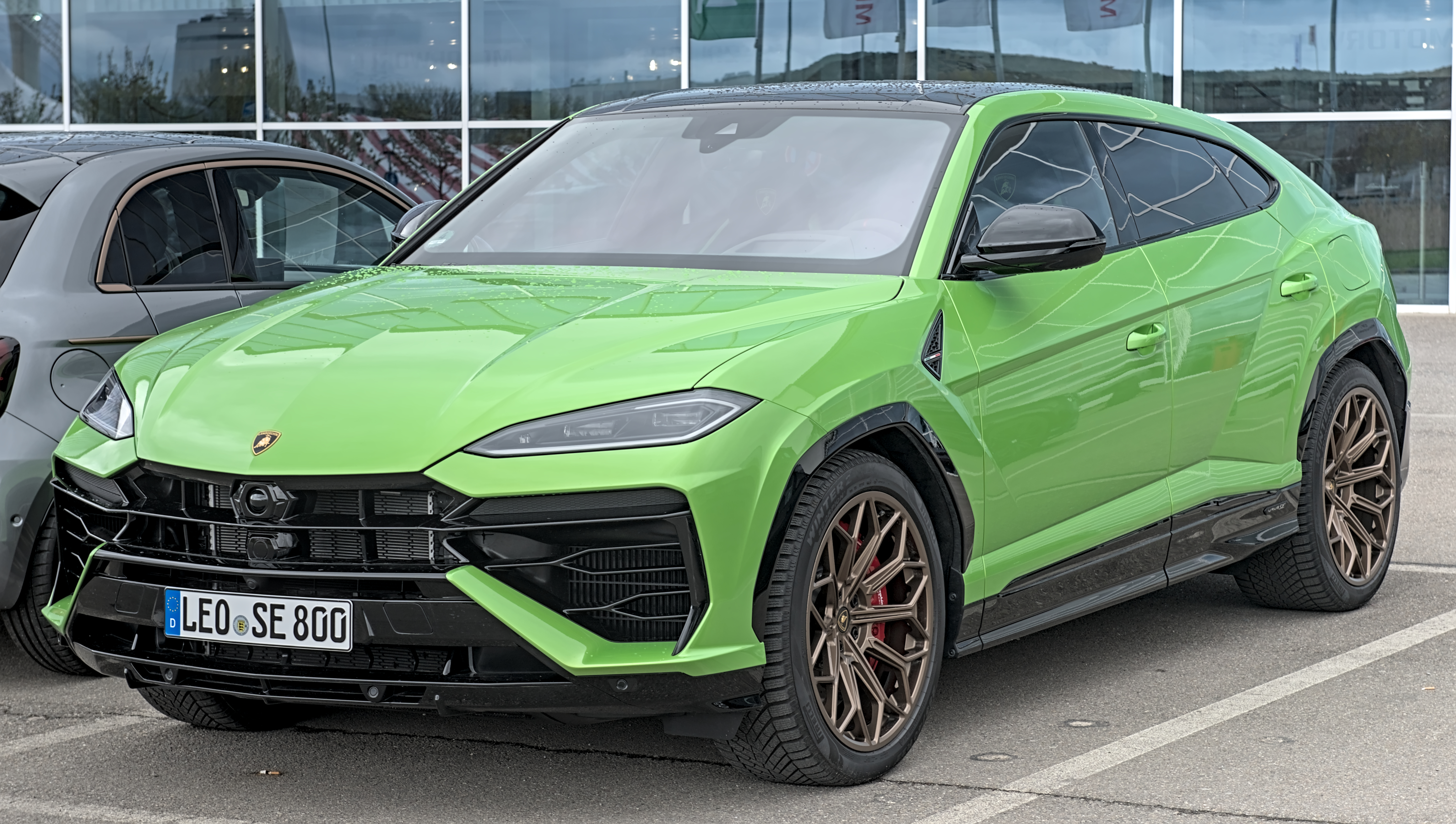
Urus SE front fascia

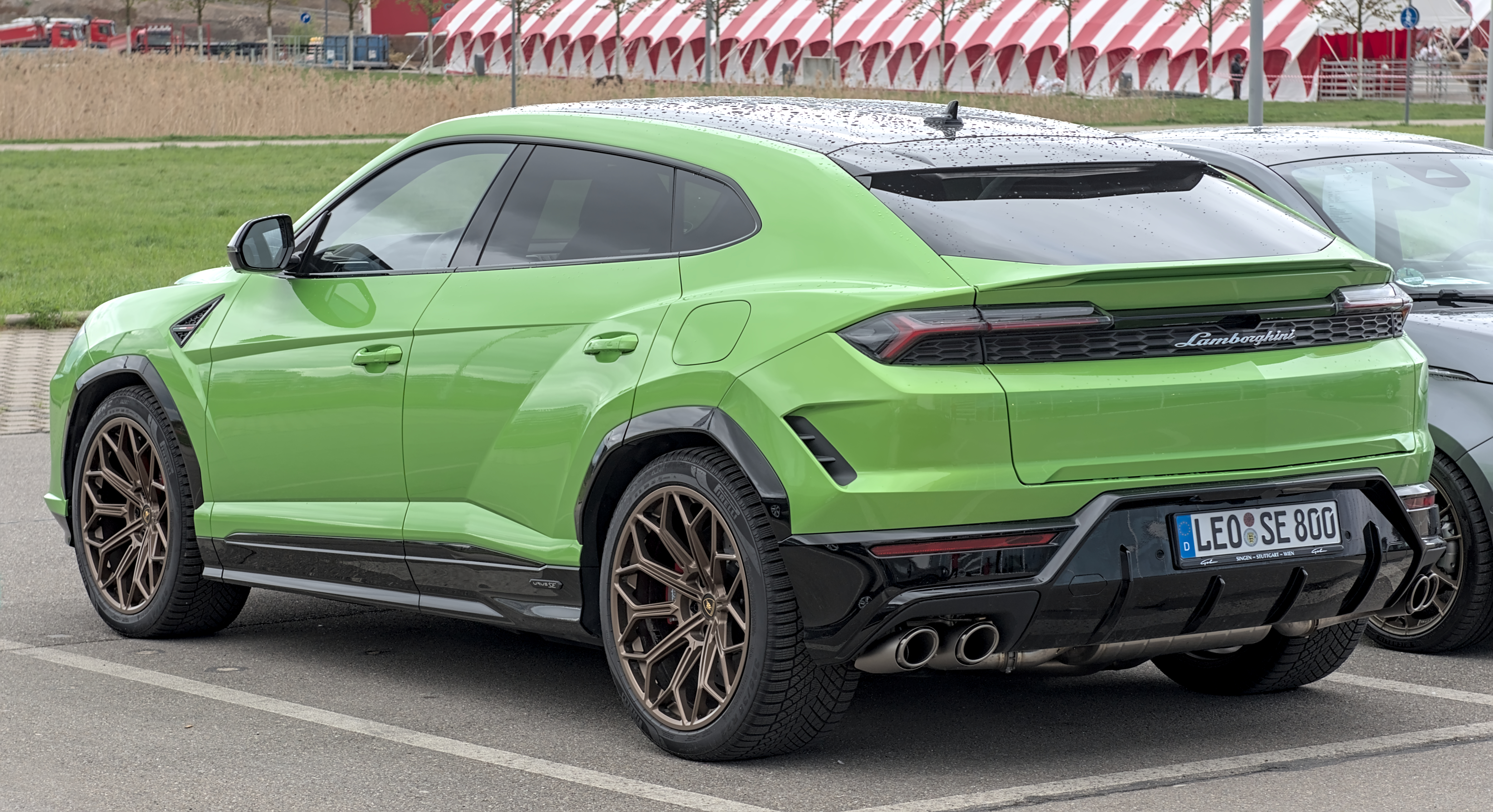
Rear profile showing updated light clusters

== Recall ==
In November 2020, the United States' road safety regulator the NHTSA recalled 2019 and 2020 model year Uruses equipped with the 4.0-litre twin-turbo V8 engine due to a fire risk, since high engine compartment temperatures can cause the fuel line quick connectors to rise to temperatures above the design operating specification limit. These elevated temperatures can cause the quick connect material to soften, which could result in a fuel leak. Lamborghini said it became aware of the issue after Porsche AG identified it in 2019. A total of 2,831 Urus were affected.

In May 2024, Lamborghini issued a recall on 2,133 units of the 2023 and 2024 model year Urus Performante and Urus S which relates to the hood latch striker rivets. When driving at speeds above 94 mph (151 km/h), increased airflow can enter between the small gaps of the hood and the front bumper which can cause the latch mechanism to fail. This could cause the hood to snap backwards, obscuring the driver's view and causing windscreen damage. In other cases, the hood could fully detach from the vehicle.

== Sales ==
Year	Production
2017	121
2018	2,565
2019	5,233
2020	4,364
2021	5,240
2022	5,785
2023	6,000
2024	6,681
2025	7,265

== See also ==
- Lamborghini LM002
- Lamborghini Estoque
