= Lamborghini Cheetah =

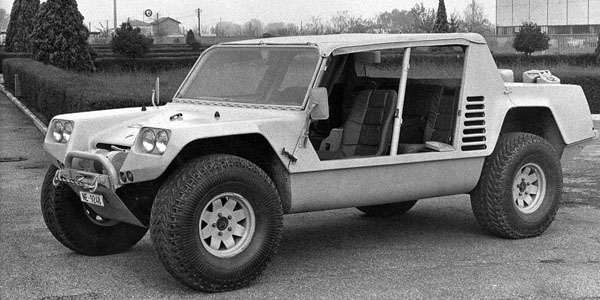

Overview
- Manufacturer: MTI for Lamborghini
- Production: 1977
- Assembly: United States: San Jose, California
- Designer: Rodney Pharis

Body and chassis
- Class: Prototype
- Layout: four-wheel drive

Powertrain
- Engine: Chrysler 5.9 liter (360 ci) V8

Dimensions
- Wheelbase: 118 in (300 cm)
- Length: 179 in (455 cm)
- Width: 60 in (152 cm)
- Curb weight: Net (including fuel) 4500 lb (2042 kg)

Chronology
- Successor: Lamborghini LM001

The Lamborghini Cheetah was an off-road prototype built in 1977 by the Italian carmaker Lamborghini.

== History ==
The Lamborghini Cheetah was Lamborghini's first attempt at an off-road vehicle. It was built on contract from Mobility Technology International (MTI), which in turn was contracted by the US military to design and build a new all-terrain vehicle. The basis of the design came from MTI, and was largely a copy of FMC's XR311 prototype developed for the military in 1970. This resulted in legal action from FMC against MTI and Lamborghini in 1977 when the Cheetah was presented at the Geneva Motor Show. The XR311 and Cheetah could be considered progenitors of the current Humvee.

The Cheetah was built in San Jose, California. After initial construction, the prototype was sent to Sant'Agata so Lamborghini could put on the finishing touches. They decided to go with a large, waterproofed 5.9-litre, 180 hp (134 kW) Chrysler V8 engine, rear mounted, with a 3-speed automatic transmission. The body was fiberglass, and inside there was enough room for four fully equipped soldiers as well as the driver.

The mounting of the engine in the rear gave the Cheetah very poor handling characteristics, and the engine choice was not powerful enough to be adequate for the 2,042 kg (4,502 lb) vehicle, resulting in overall poor performance.

The only finished prototype was never tested by the US military, only demonstrated to them by its designer, Rodney Pharis. It was later sold to Teledyne Continental Motors by MTI and still exists today.

In the end, the military contract was awarded to AM General and their similar looking Humvee.

The failure of the Cheetah project, along with Lamborghini's financial problems, led to the cancellation of a contract from BMW to develop their M1 sports car.

Lamborghini eventually developed the Lamborghini LM002 — a similar design, but with a 12-cylinder engine from the Lamborghini Countach mounted in the front.

== Options (partial list) ==
- Top and door kit
- Turbocharger kit
- Electric winch kit
- Police vehicle kit
- Armored (Kevlar) top kit
- Armored (small arms) fuel tank and radiator
- Weapon mounting kit

== See also ==
- VLEGA Gaucho
- V.A.M.P. (G.I. Joe)
