= Lamborghini LM001 =

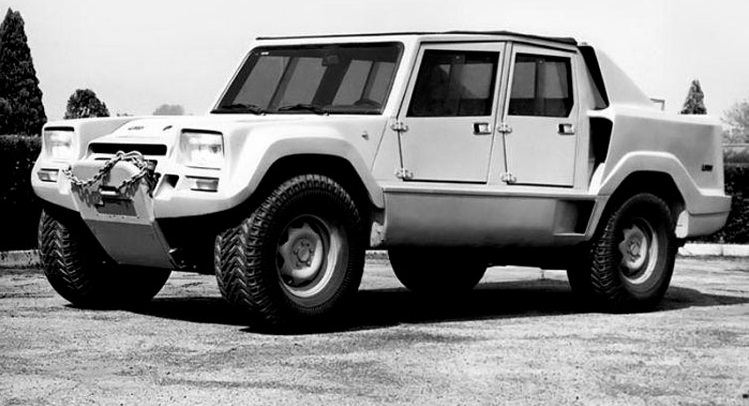

Overview
- Manufacturer: Lamborghini
- Production: 1981; 1 built
- Designer: Giulio Alfieri

Body and chassis
- Class: Concept car
- Layout: Rear-engine, four-wheel-drive

Powertrain
- Engine: 5.9 L (360 ci) AMC V8

Dimensions
- Curb weight: 2,100 kg (4,630 lb)

Chronology
- Predecessor: Lamborghini Cheetah
- Successor: Lamborghini LMA002

The Lamborghini LM001 was a prototype off-road vehicle designed and built by Lamborghini. It was first revealed at the 1981 Geneva Auto Show alongside the new Jalpa.

Despite the failure of the Cheetah project, the idea of a Lamborghini off-road vehicle was still very much alive, and with new capital from investors, the Cheetah concept was redesigned into the LM001. Unlike the Cheetah's Chrysler engine, the LM001 prototype had a 180 hp (134 kW) 5.9 L (360 ci) AMC-built V8, with the intention of offering the V12 from the Countach for production models.

The LM001 was found to have unfavorable handling characteristics when accelerating. This problem was traced to the placement of the engine in the rear. As a result, the LM001 was discontinued after one prototype was made.
