= Tractor =

Engineering vehicle specifically designed to deliver a high tractive effort

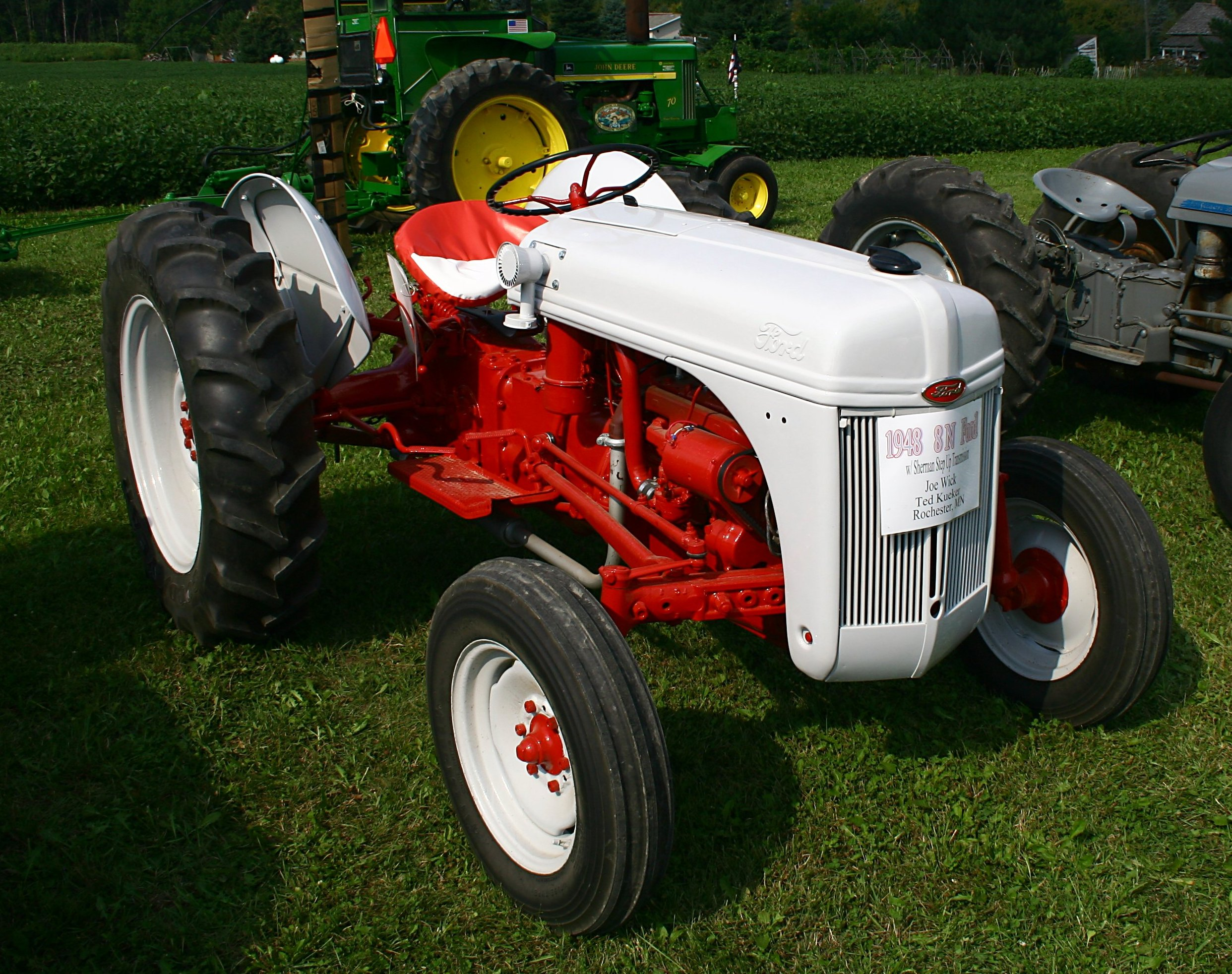
The Ford N-series tractor helped revolutionize modern mechanized agriculture with its Ferguson three-point hitch.

A tractor is an engineering vehicle specifically designed to deliver a high tractive effort (or torque) at slow speeds, for the purposes of hauling a trailer or machinery, such as that used in agriculture, mining or construction. Most commonly, the term is used to describe a farm vehicle that provides the power and traction to mechanize agricultural tasks, especially (and originally) tillage, and now many more. Agricultural implements may be towed behind or mounted on the tractor, and the tractor may also provide a source of power if the implement is mechanised.

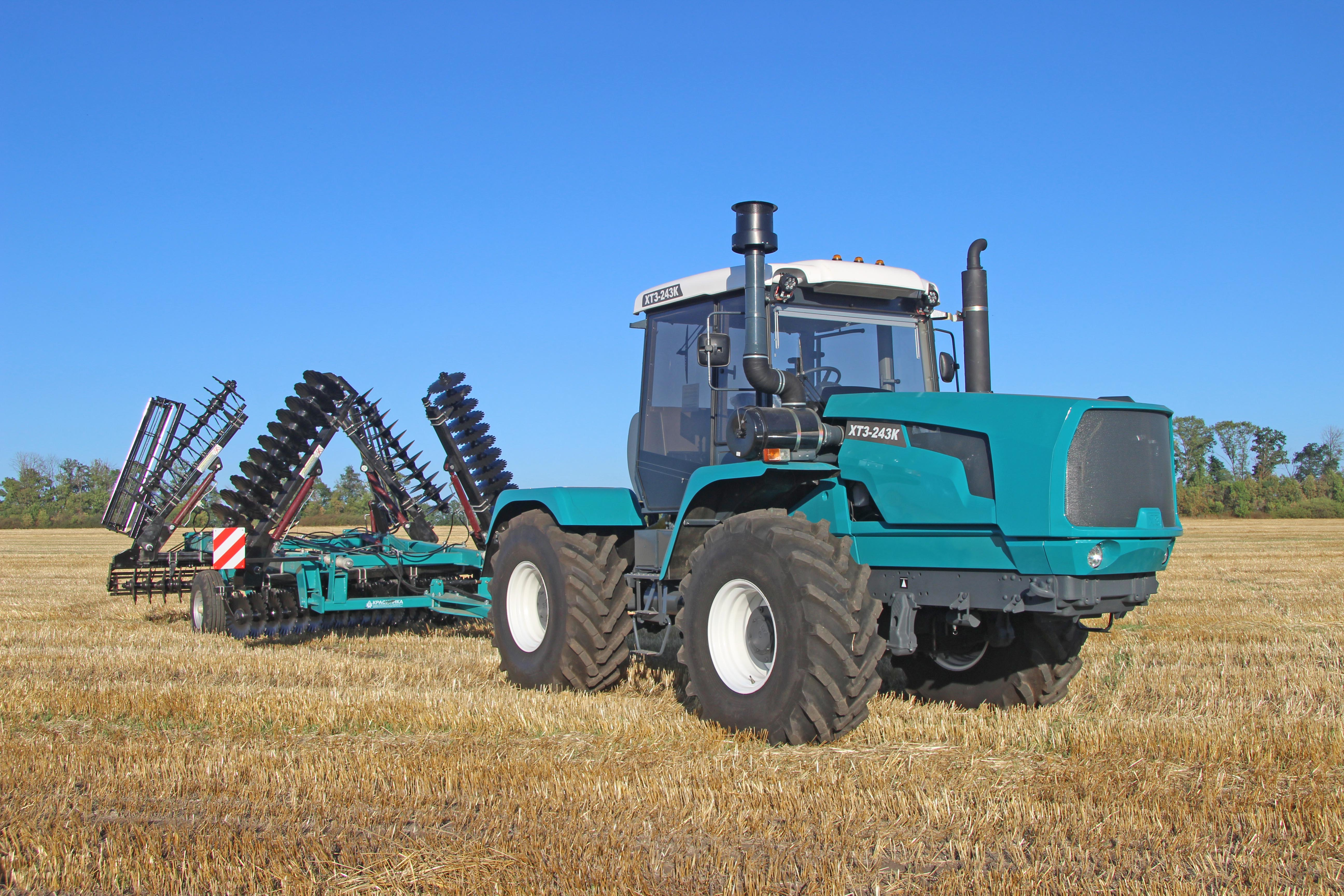
A modern Ukrainian tractor XTZ-243K

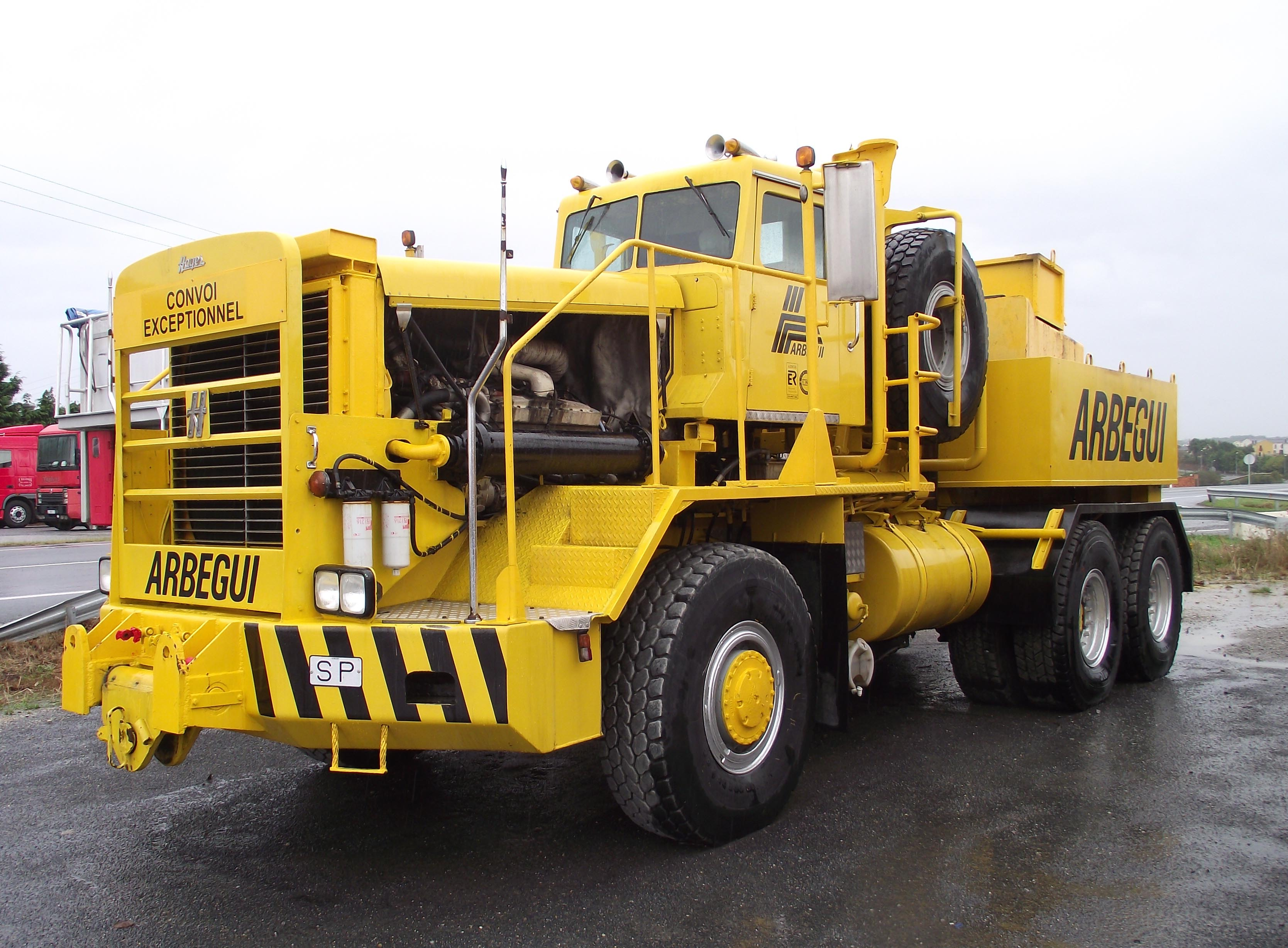
This Hayes WHDX 70–170 6×6 ballast tractor is also a form of tractor, as are artillery tractors and the power units which pull semi-trucks.

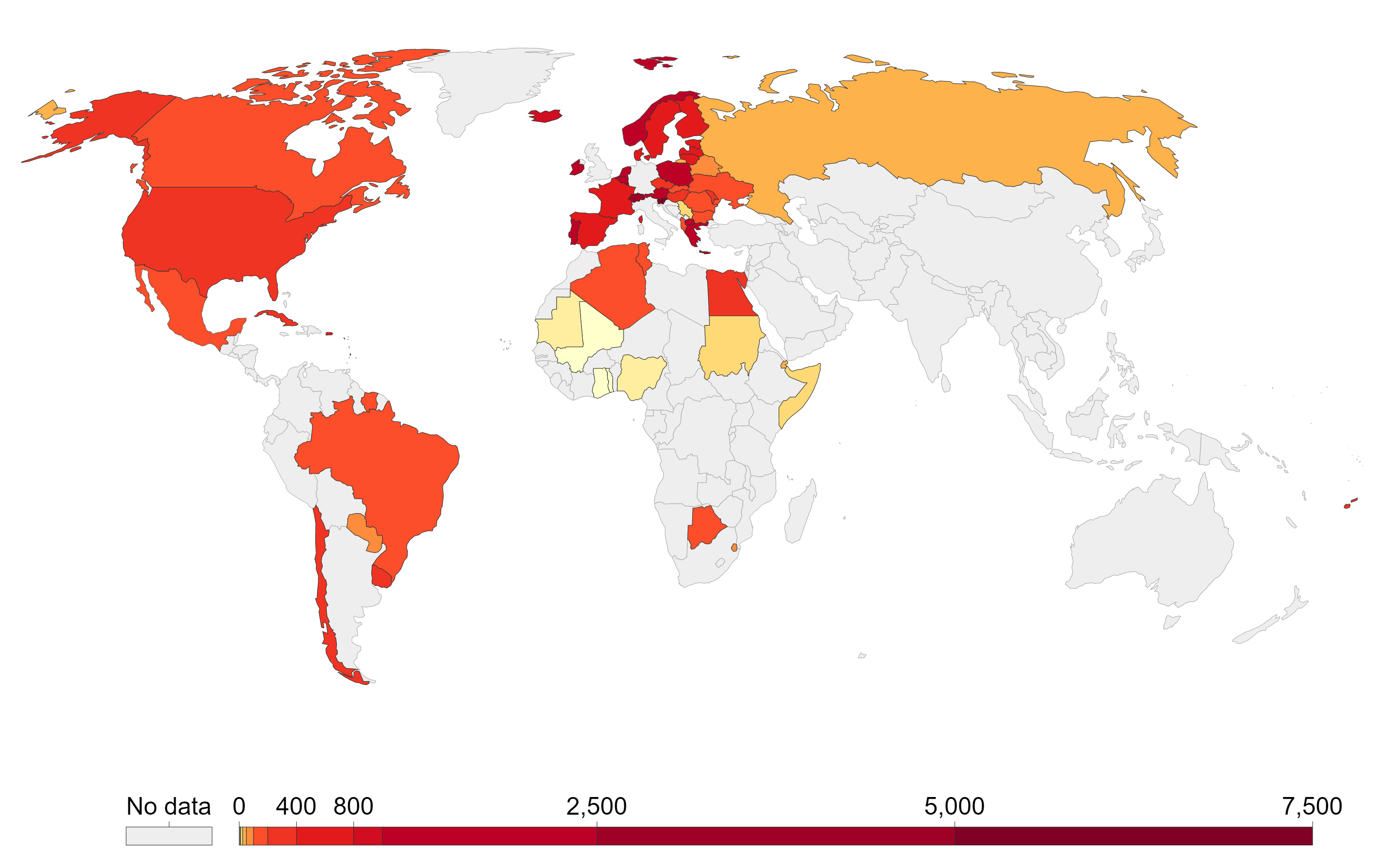
Agricultural tractors per 100 square kilometres of arable land

== Etymology ==
The word tractor was taken from Latin, being the agent noun of trahere "to pull". The first recorded use of the word meaning "an engine or vehicle for pulling wagons or plows" occurred in 1896, from the earlier term "traction motor" (1859).

=== National variations ===
In the UK, Ireland, Australia, India, Spain, Argentina, Slovenia, Serbia, Croatia, the Netherlands, and Germany, the word "tractor" usually means "farm tractor", and the use of the word "tractor" to mean other types of vehicles is familiar to the vehicle trade, but unfamiliar to much of the general public. In Canada and the US, the word may also refer to the road tractor portion of a tractor trailer truck, but also usually refers to the piece of farm equipment.

== History ==
=== Traction engines ===
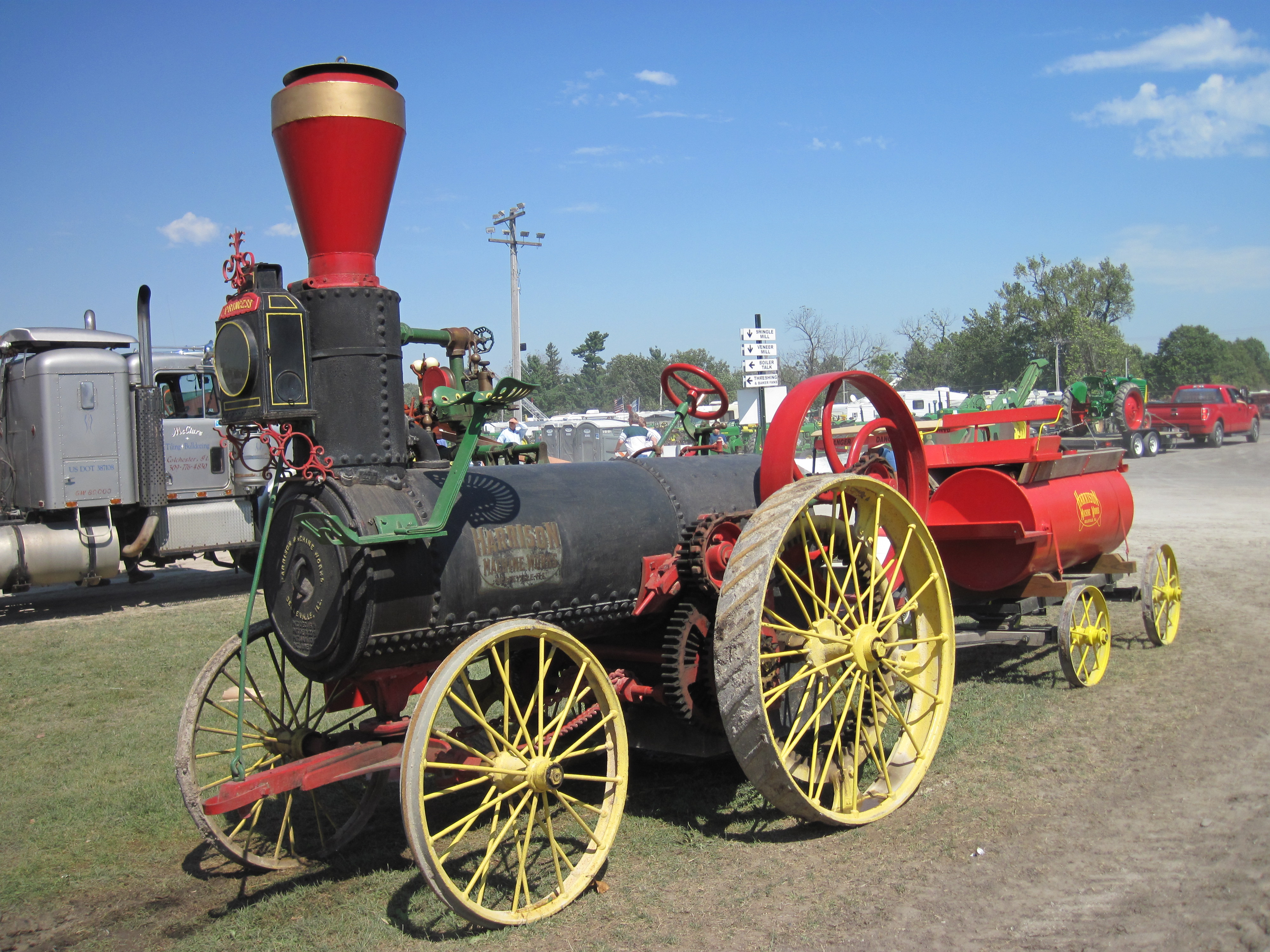
1882 Harrison Machine Works steam-powered traction engine

The first powered farm implements in the early 19th century were portable engines – steam engines on wheels that could be used to drive mechanical farm machinery by way of a flexible belt. Richard Trevithick designed the first 'semi-portable' stationary steam engine for agricultural use, known as a "barn engine" in 1812, and it was used to drive a corn threshing machine. The truly portable engine was invented in 1839 by William Tuxford of Boston, Lincolnshire who started manufacture of an engine built around a locomotive-style boiler with horizontal smoke tubes. A large flywheel was mounted on the crankshaft, and a stout leather belt was used to transfer the drive to the equipment being driven. In the 1850s, John Fowler used a Clayton & Shuttleworth portable engine to drive apparatus in the first public demonstrations of the application of cable haulage to cultivation.

In parallel with the early portable engine development, many engineers attempted to make them self-propelled – the forerunners of the traction engine. In most cases this was achieved by fitting a sprocket on the end of the crankshaft, and running a chain from this to a larger sprocket on the rear axle. These experiments met with mixed success. The first proper traction engine, in the form recognisable today, was developed in 1859 when British engineer Thomas Aveling modified a Clayton & Shuttleworth portable engine, which had to be hauled from job to job by horses, into a self-propelled one. The alteration was made by fitting a long driving chain between the crankshaft and the rear axle.

The first half of the 1860s was a period of great experimentation but by the end of the decade the standard form of the traction engine had evolved and changed little over the next sixty years. It was widely adopted for agricultural use. The first tractors were steam-powered plowing engines. They were used in pairs, placed on either side of a field to haul a plow back and forth between them using a wire cable. In Britain Mann's and Garrett developed steam tractors for direct ploughing, but the heavy, wet soil of England meant that these designs were less economical than a team of horses. In the United States, where soil conditions permitted, steam tractors were used to direct-haul plows. Steam-powered agricultural engines remained in use well into the 20th century until reliable internal combustion engines had been developed.

=== Fuel ===
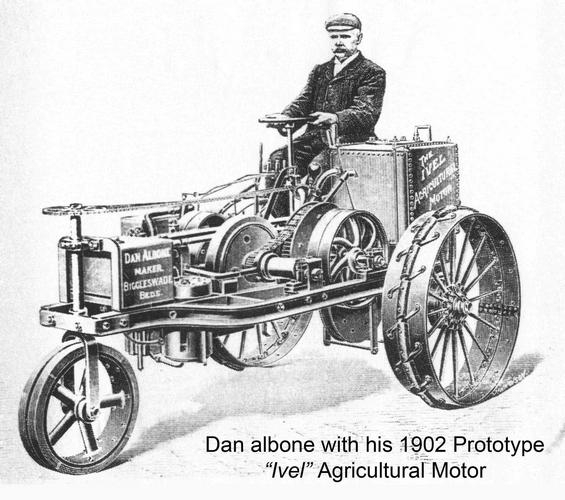
Dan Albone with his 1902 prototype Ivel Agricultural Motor, the first successful lightweight gasoline-powered tractor

The first gasoline powered tractors were built in Illinois, by John Charter combining single cylinder Otto engines with a Rumley Steam engine chassis, in 1889. In 1892, John Froelich built a gasoline-powered tractor in Clayton County, Iowa, US. A Van Duzen single-cylinder gasoline engine was mounted on a Robinson engine chassis, which could be controlled and propelled by Froelich's gear box. After receiving a patent, Froelich started up the Waterloo Gasoline Engine Company and invested all of his assets. The venture was very unsuccessful, and by 1895 all was lost and he went out of business.

Richard Hornsby & Sons are credited with producing and selling the first oil-engined tractor in Britain, invented by Herbert Akroyd Stuart. The Hornsby-Akroyd Patent Safety Oil Traction Engine was made in 1896 with a 20 hp (15 kW) engine. In 1897, it was bought by Mr. Locke-King, the first recorded British tractor sale. That year, it won a Silver Medal from the Royal Agricultural Society of England. It later returned to the factory for a caterpillar track fitting.

The first commercially successful light-weight petrol-powered general purpose tractor was built by Dan Albone, a British inventor in 1901. He filed for a patent on 15 February 1902 for his tractor design and then formed Ivel Agricultural Motors Limited. The other directors were Selwyn Edge, Charles Jarrott, John Hewitt and Lord Willoughby. He called his machine the Ivel Agricultural Motor; the word "tractor" came into common use after Hart-Parr created it. The Ivel Agricultural Motor was light, powerful and compact. It had one front wheel, with a solid rubber tyre, and two large rear wheels like a modern tractor. The engine used water cooling, utilizing the thermo-syphon effect. It had one forward and one reverse gear. A pulley wheel on the left hand side allowed it to be used as a stationary engine, driving a wide range of agricultural machinery. The 1903 sale price was £300. His tractor won a medal at the Royal Agricultural Show, in 1903 and 1904. About 500 were built, and many were exported all over the world. The original engine was made by Payne & Co. of Coventry. After 1906, French Aster engines were used.

The first successful American tractor was built by Charles W. Hart and Charles H. Parr. They developed a two-cylinder gasoline engine and set up their business in Charles City, Iowa. In 1903, the firm built 15 tractors. Their 14,000 pounds (6,400 kg) #3 is the oldest surviving internal combustion engine tractor in the United States, and is on display at the Smithsonian National Museum of American History in Washington, D.C. The two-cylinder engine has a unique hit-and-miss firing cycle that produced 30 hp (22 kW) at the belt and 18 hp (13 kW) at the drawbar.

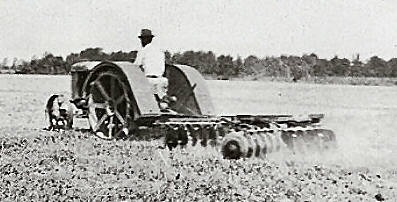
An early Fordson discing a field in Princess Anne County, Virginia, in 1925

In 1908, the Saunderson Tractor and Implement Co. of Bedford introduced a four-wheel design, and became the largest tractor manufacturer in Britain at the time. While the earlier, heavier tractors were initially very successful, it became increasingly apparent at this time that the weight of a large supporting frame was less efficient than lighter designs. Henry Ford introduced a light-weight, mass-produced design which largely displaced the heavier designs. Some companies halfheartedly followed suit with mediocre designs, as if to disprove the concept, but they were largely unsuccessful in that endeavor.

While unpopular at first, these gasoline-powered machines began to catch on in the 1910s, when they became smaller and more affordable. Henry Ford introduced the Fordson, a wildly popular mass-produced tractor, in 1917. They were built in the U.S., Ireland, England and Russia, and by 1923, Fordson had 77% of the U.S. market. The Fordson dispensed with a frame, using the strength of the engine block to hold the machine together. By the 1920s, tractors with gasoline-powered internal combustion engines had become the norm.

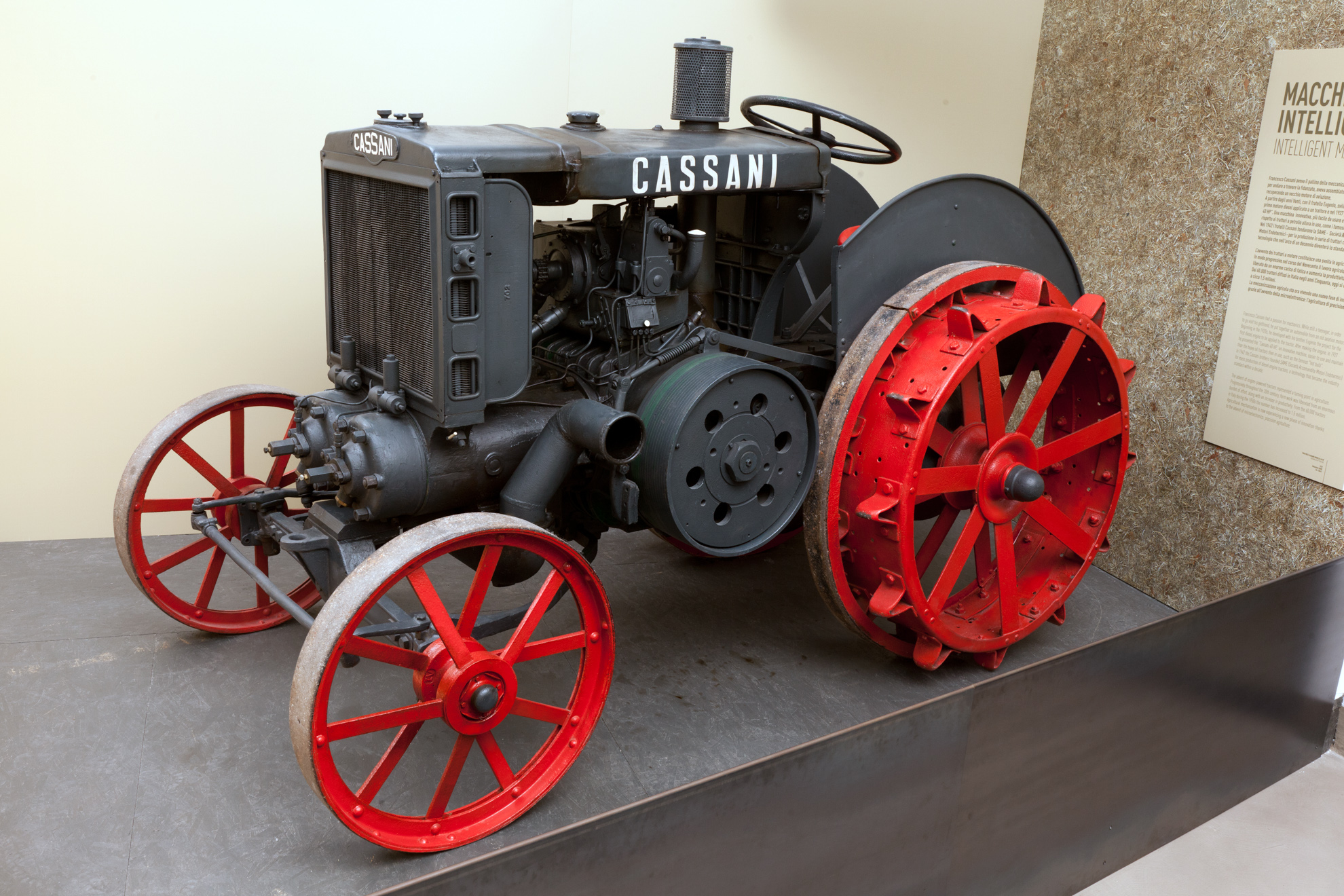
Tractor Cassani model 40HP, at the Museo nazionale della scienza e della tecnologia Leonardo da Vinci of Milan

The first three-point hitches were experimented with in 1917. After Harry Ferguson applied for a British patent for his three-point hitch in 1926, they became popular. A three-point attachment of the implement to the tractor is the simplest and the only statically determinate way of joining two bodies in engineering. The Ferguson-Brown Company produced the Model A Ferguson-Brown tractor with a Ferguson-designed hydraulic hitch. In 1938 Ferguson entered into a collaboration with Henry Ford to produce the Ford-Ferguson 9N tractor. The three-point hitch soon became the favorite hitch attachment system among farmers around the world. This tractor model also included a rear Power Take Off (PTO) shaft that could be used to power three-point-hitch–mounted implements, such as sickle-bar mowers.

=== Diffusion of tractors ===
Economic historians have described the farm tractor as "undoubtedly one of the most revolutionary technological innovations in the history of modern agriculture, vastly increasing the supply of farm power, raising productivity, and reshaping the rural landscape." However, adoption of tractor technology encountered resistance.

In 1910, there were 500 gas tractors in the United States. In 1920, there were nearly 5,000 gas tractors in the United States. In 1920, 3.6% of farms in the United States had tractors. By the end of the 1920s, 13.5% of farms in the US had tractors. During the Great Depression, this number increased to 40%. By 1935, nearly a million tractors were used in the United States whereas 15,000 were used in Germany.

=== Electric ===
In 1969, General Electric introduced the Elec-Trak, the first commercial, electric tractor (electric-powered garden tractor). The Elec-Trak was manufactured by General Electric until 1975.

Electric tractors are manufactured by a German company, Fendt, and by US companies, Solectrac and Monarch Tractor.

John Deere's prototype electric tractor is a plug-in, powered by an electrical cable.

Kubota is prototyping an autonomous electric tractor.

== Design, power and transmission ==
=== Configuration ===
Tractors can be generally classified by number of axles or wheels, with main categories of two-wheel tractors (single-axle tractors) and four-wheel tractors (two-axle tractors); more axles are possible but uncommon. Among four-wheel tractors (two-axle tractors), most are two-wheel–drive (usually at the rear); but many are two-wheel–drive with front-wheel assist, four-wheel–drive (often with articulated steering), or tracked (with continuous steel or rubber tracks).

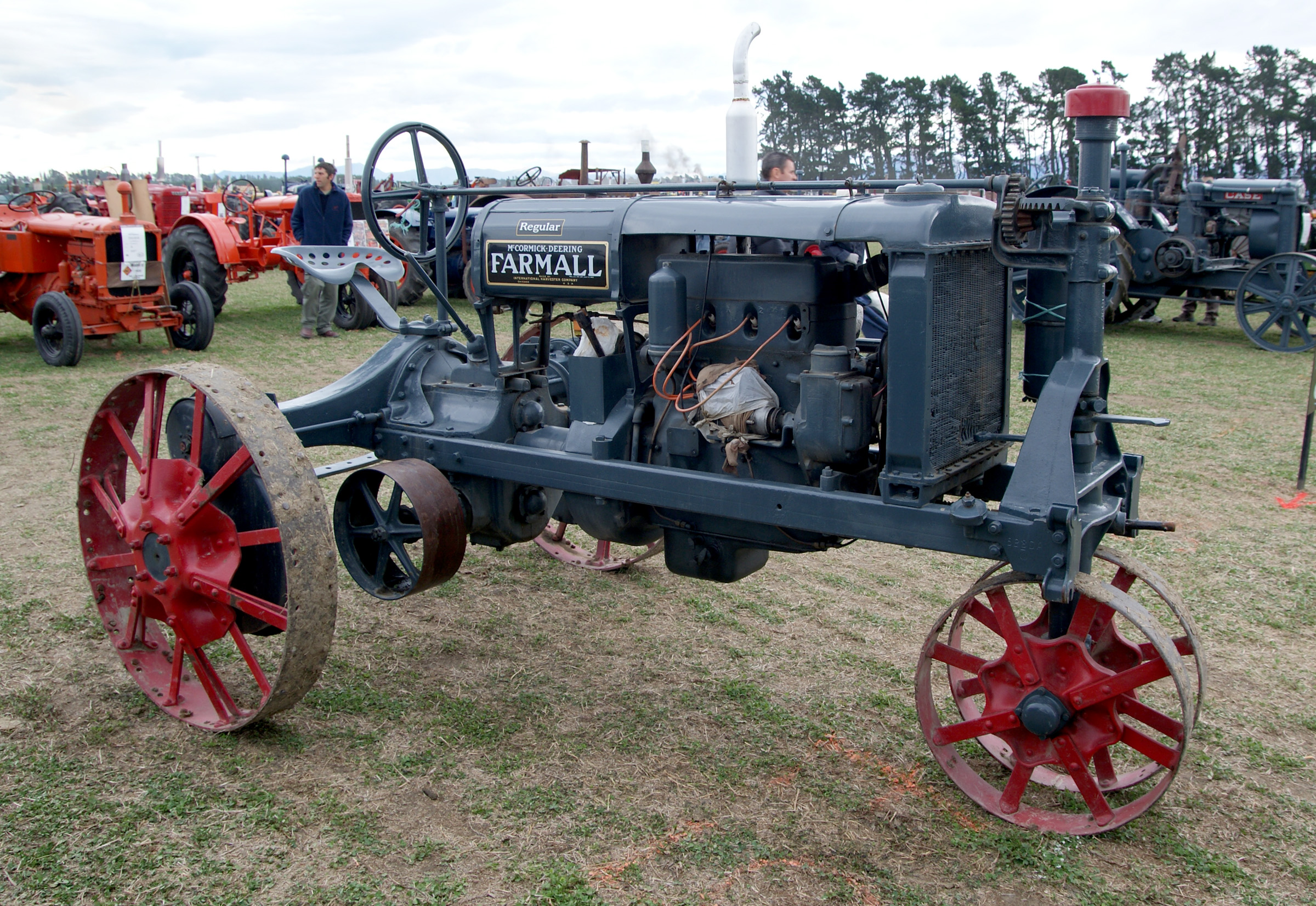
The Farmall introduced the row crop configuration, which utilized a narrow frontend wheel arrangement.

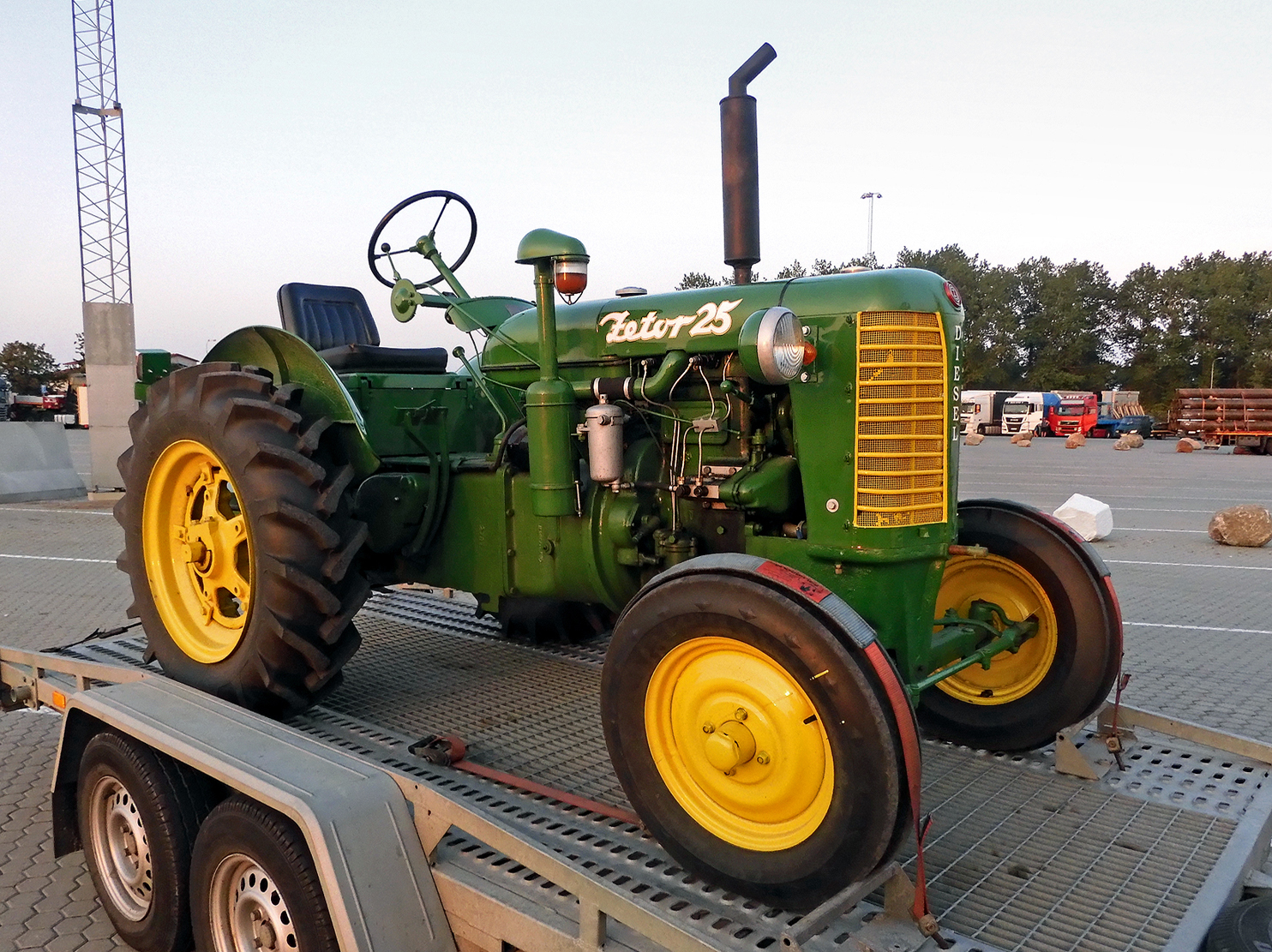
The diesel-powered Zetor 25 was the first model from the Czech manufacturer Zetor in 1946.

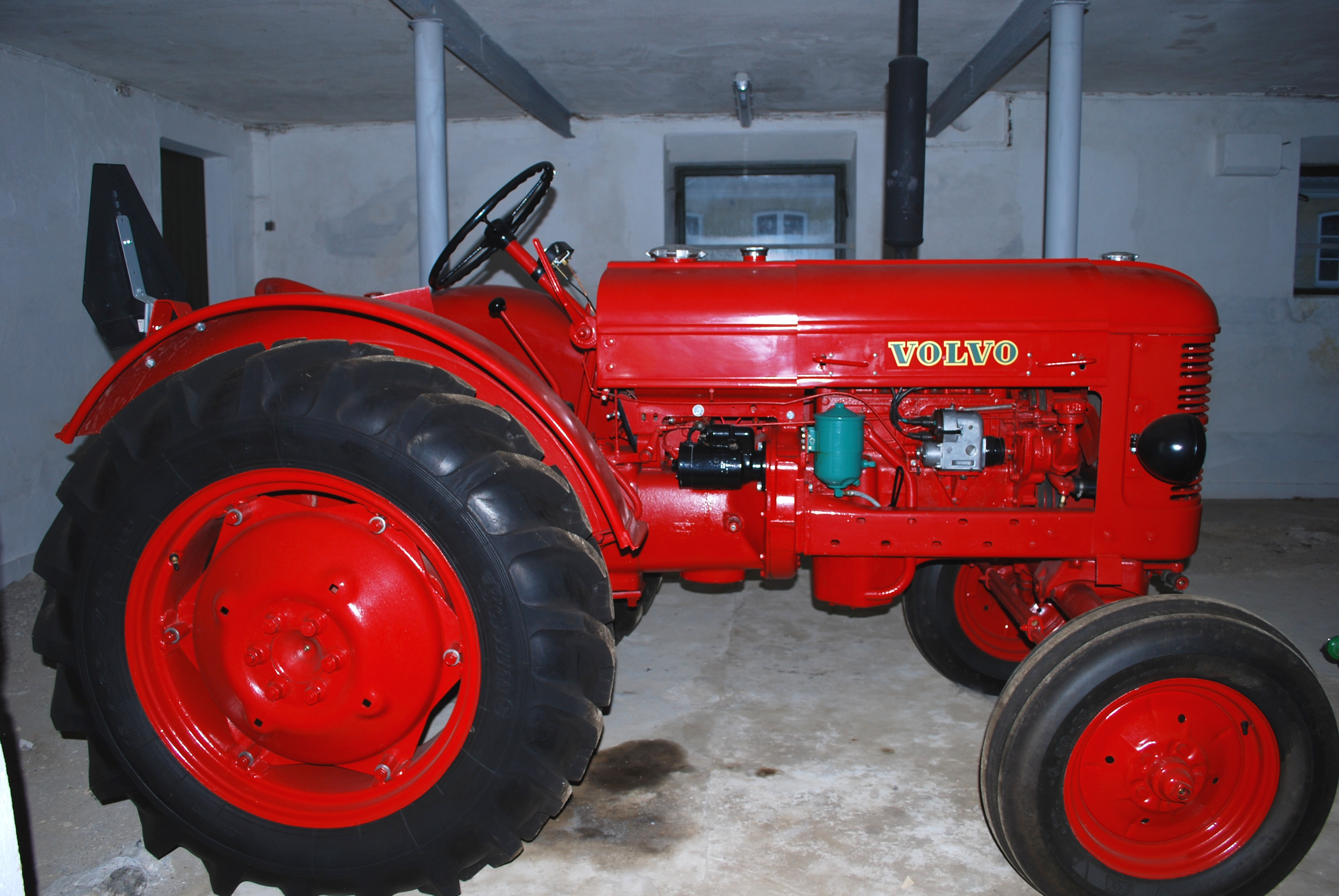
Volvo T25, 1956, gasoline tractor

The classic farm tractor is a simple open vehicle, with two very large driving wheels on an axle below a single seat (the seat and steering wheel consequently are in the center), and the engine in front of the driver, with two steerable wheels below the engine compartment. This basic design has remained unchanged for a number of years after being pioneered by Wallis, but enclosed cabs are fitted on almost all modern models, for operator safety and comfort.

In some localities with heavy or wet soils, notably in the Central Valley of California, the "Caterpillar" or "crawler" type of tracked tractor became popular due to superior traction and flotation. These were usually maneuvered through the use of turning brake pedals and separate track clutches operated by levers rather than a steering wheel.

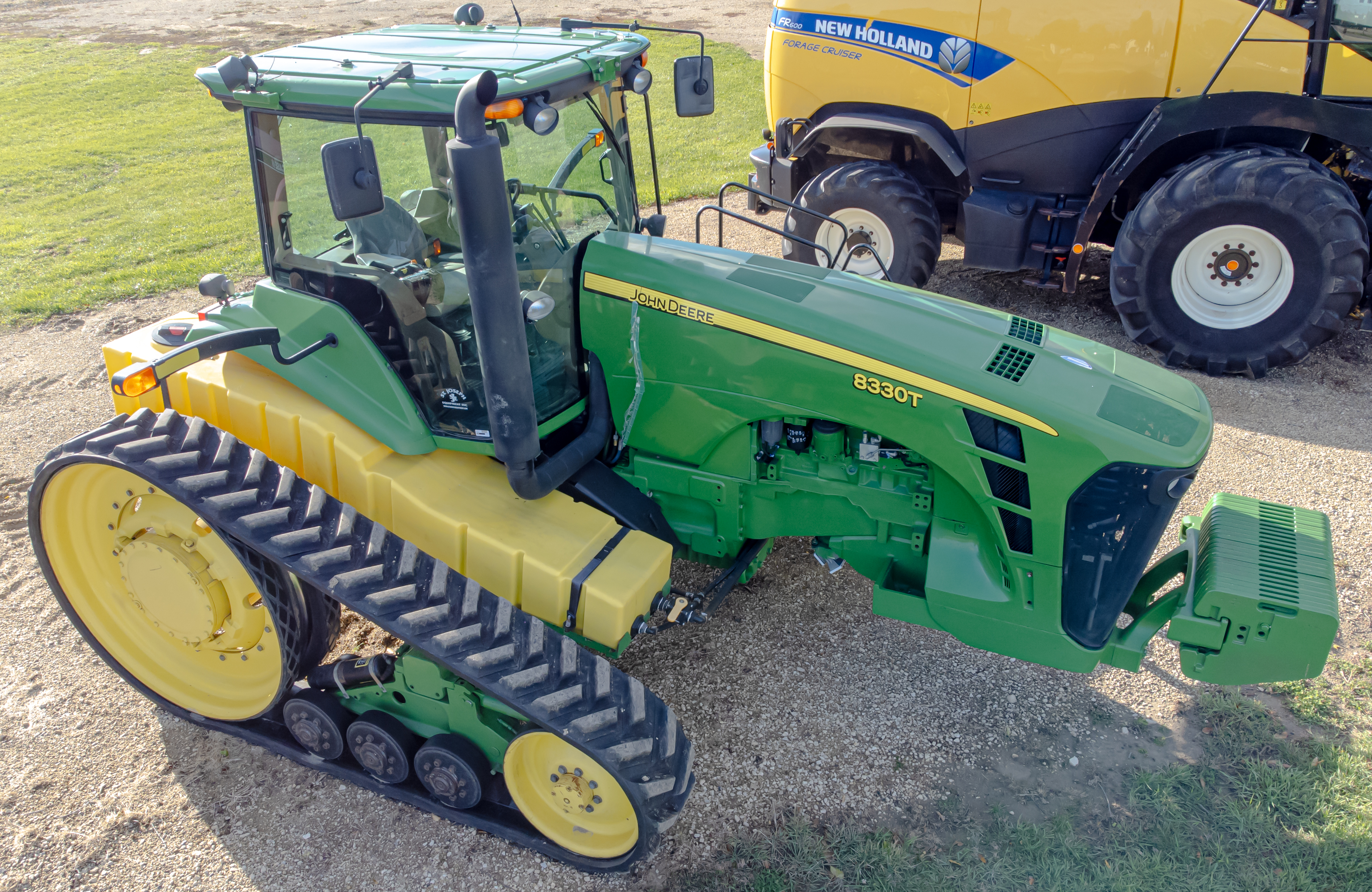
John Deere tracked tractor 8330T

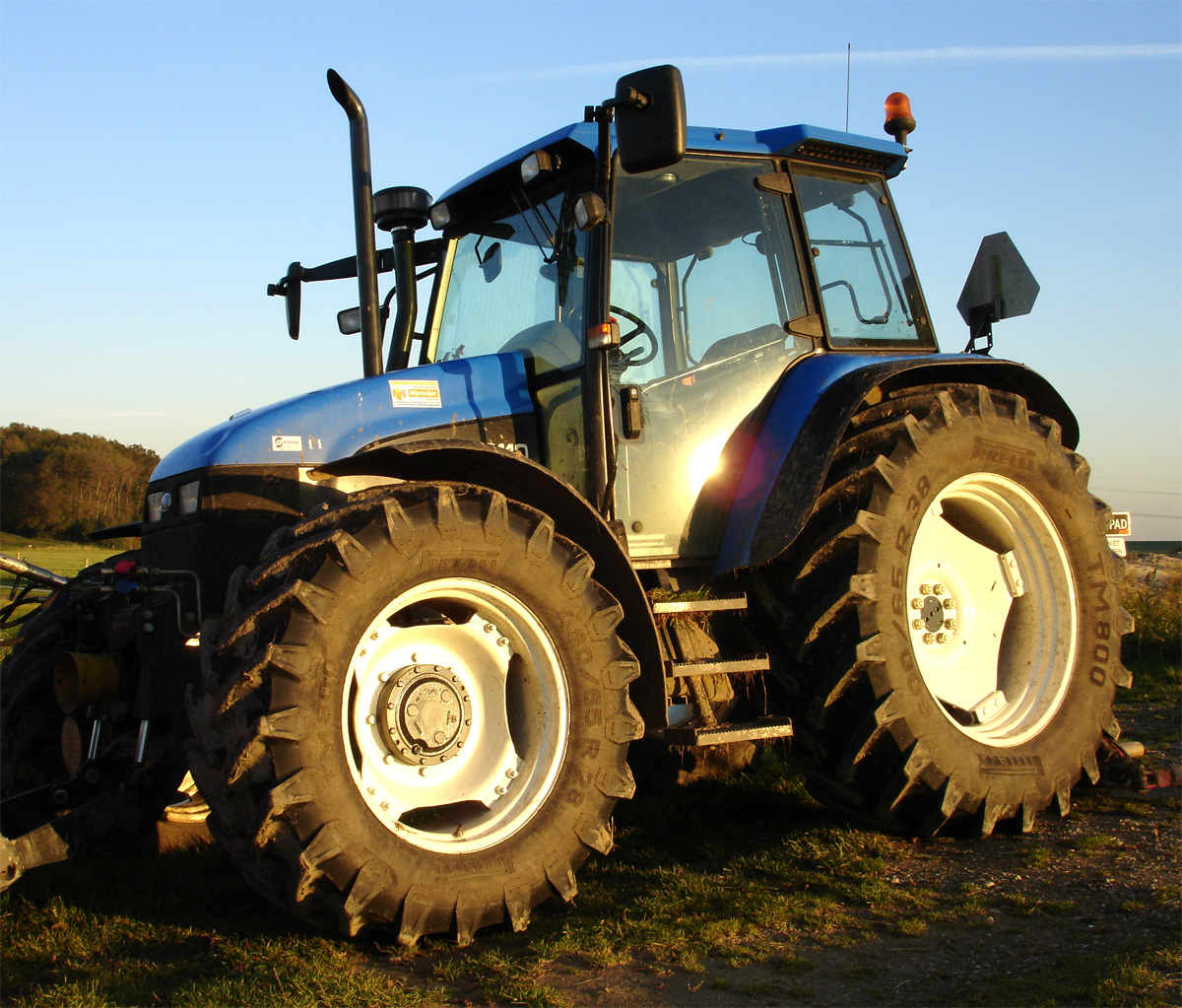
A modern front-wheel-assist farm tractor in the Netherlands

Four-wheel drive tractors began to appear in the 1960s. Some four-wheel drive tractors have the standard "two large, two small" configuration typical of smaller tractors, while some have four large, powered wheels. The larger tractors are typically an articulated, center-hinged design steered by hydraulic cylinders that move the forward power unit while the trailing unit is not steered separately.

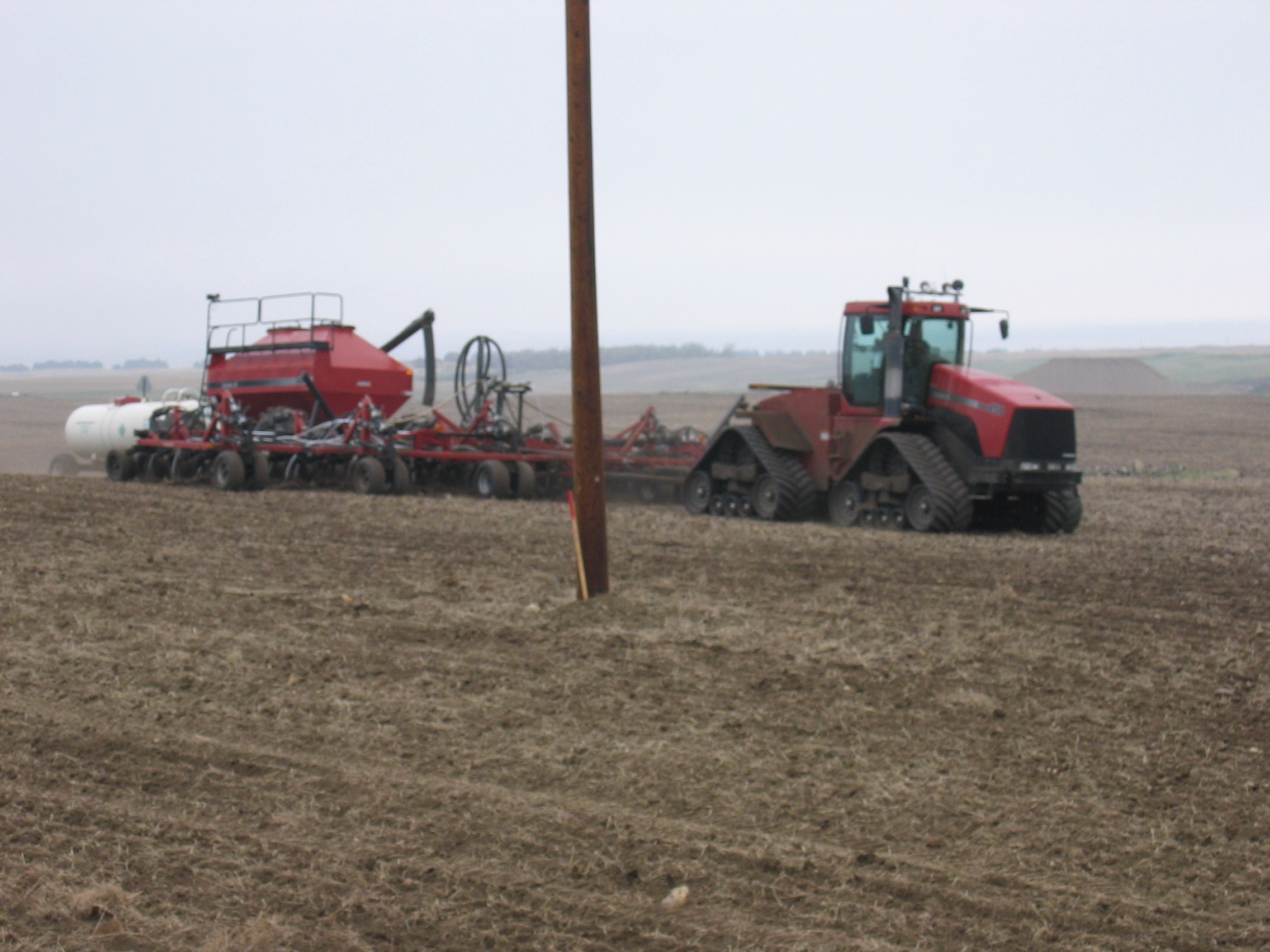
A modern 4wd articulated crawler power unit planting wheat in North Dakota

In the early 21st century, articulated or non-articulated, steerable multitrack tractors have largely supplanted the Caterpillar type for farm use. Larger types of modern farm tractors include articulated four-wheel or eight-wheel drive units with one or two power units which are hinged in the middle and steered by hydraulic clutches or pumps. A relatively recent development is the replacement of wheels or steel crawler-type tracks with flexible, steel-reinforced rubber tracks, usually powered by hydrostatic or completely hydraulic driving mechanisms. The configuration of these tractors bears little resemblance to the classic farm tractor design.

=== Engine and fuels ===
The predecessors of modern tractors, traction engines, used steam engines for power.

==== Gasoline and kerosene ====
Since the turn of the 20th century, internal combustion engines have been the power source of choice. Between 1900 and 1960, gasoline was the predominant fuel, with kerosene (the Rumely Oil Pull was the most notable of this kind)being a common alternative. Generally, one engine could burn any of those, although cold starting was easiest on gasoline. Often, a small auxiliary fuel tank was available to hold gasoline for cold starting and warm-up, while the main fuel tank held whatever fuel was most convenient or least expensive for the particular farmer. In the United Kingdom, a gasoline-kerosene engine is known as a petrol-paraffin engine.

==== Diesel ====
Dieselisation gained momentum starting in the 1960s, and modern farm tractors usually employ diesel engines, which range in power output from 18 to 575 horsepower (15 to 480 kW). Size and output are dependent on application, with smaller tractors used for lawn mowing, landscaping, orchard work, and truck farming, and larger tractors for vast fields of wheat, corn, soy, and other bulk crops.

==== Liquefied petroleum gas ====
Liquefied petroleum gas (LPG) or propane also have been used as tractor fuels, but require special pressurized fuel tanks and filling equipment and produced less power, so are less prevalent in most markets. Most are confined for inside work due to their clean burning.

==== Wood ====
During the Second World War, petroleum-based fuel was scarce in Europe, so European vehicles, including tractors, were commonly converted to use a wood gas generator, or gasifier.

==== Biodiesel ====
In some countries, such as Germany, biodiesel is often used. Some other biofuels, such as straight vegetable oil, are also being used by some farmers.

==== Electric powered ====
Prototype battery powered electric tractors are being developed by a German company, Fendt, and by two US companies, Solectrac and Monarch Tractor. John Deere's protoype electric tractor is a plug-in, powered by an electrical cable. Kubota is prototyping an autonomous electric tractor.

=== Transmission ===
Most older farm tractors use a manual transmission with several gear ratios, typically three to six, sometimes multiplied into two or three ranges. This arrangement provides a set of discrete ratios that, combined with the varying of the throttle, allow final-drive speeds from less than one up to about 25 miles per hour (40 km/h), with the lower speeds used for working the land and the highest speed used on the road.

Slow, controllable speeds are necessary for most of the operations performed with a tractor. They help give the farmer a larger degree of control in certain situations, such as field work. When travelling on public roads, the slow operating speeds can cause problems, such as long queues or tailbacks, which can delay or annoy motorists in cars and trucks. These motorists are responsible for being duly careful around farm tractors and sharing the road with them, but many shirk this responsibility, so various ways to minimize the interaction or minimize the speed differential are employed where feasible. Some countries (for example the Netherlands) employ a road sign on some roads that means "no farm tractors". Some modern tractors, such as the JCB Fastrac, are now capable of much higher road speeds of around 50 mph (80 km/h).

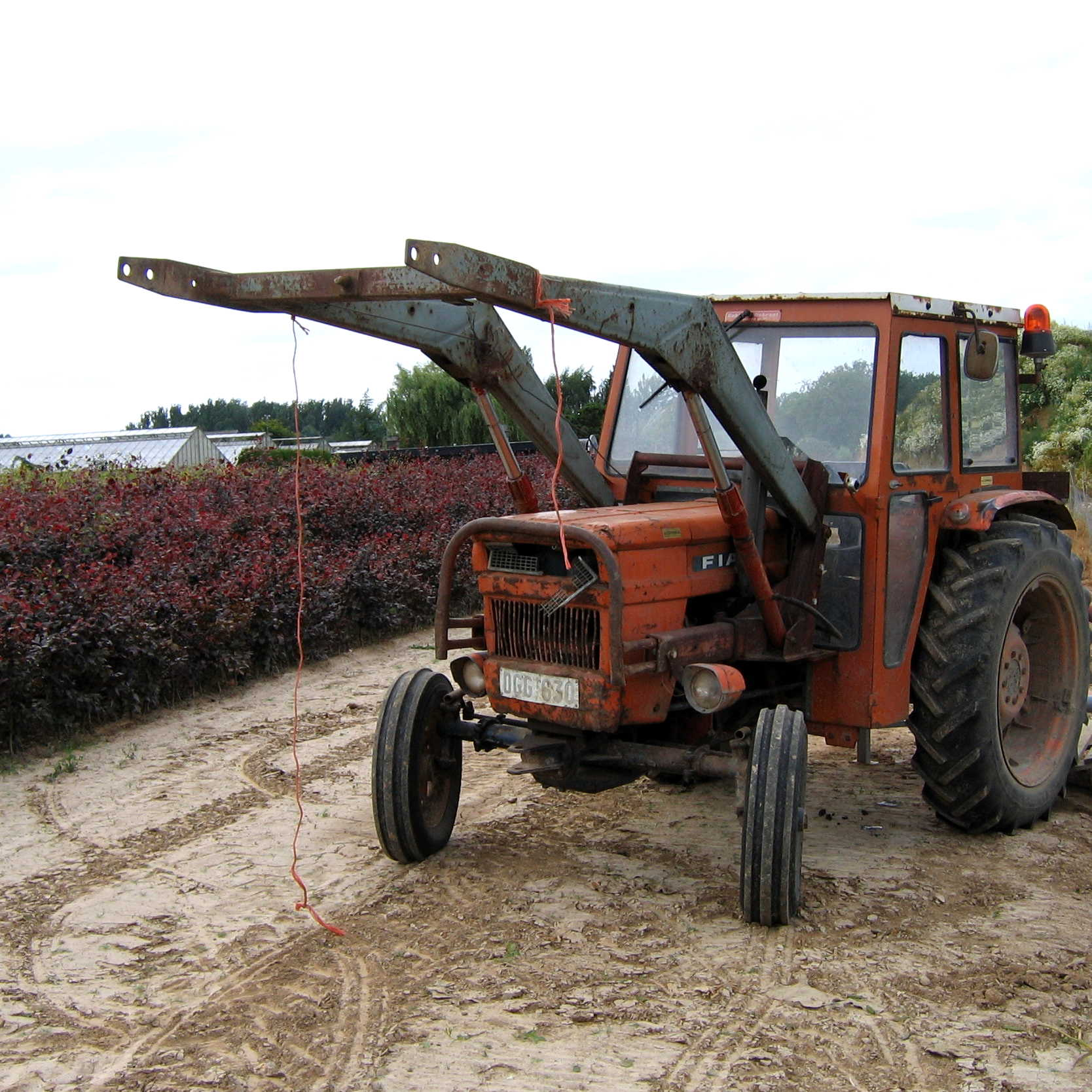
An older model European farm tractor, of the type still common in Eastern Europe

Older tractors usually have unsynchronized transmission designs, which often require the operator to engage the clutch to shift between gears. This mode of use is inherently unsuited to some of the work tractors do, and has been circumvented in various ways over the years. For existing unsynchronized tractors, the methods of circumvention are double clutching or power-shifting, both of which require the operator to rely on skill to speed-match the gears while shifting, and are undesirable from a risk-mitigation standpoint because of what can go wrong if the operator makes a mistake – transmission damage is possible, and loss of vehicle control can occur if the tractor is towing a heavy load either uphill or downhill – something that tractors often do. Therefore, operator's manuals for most of these tractors state one must always stop the tractor before shifting.

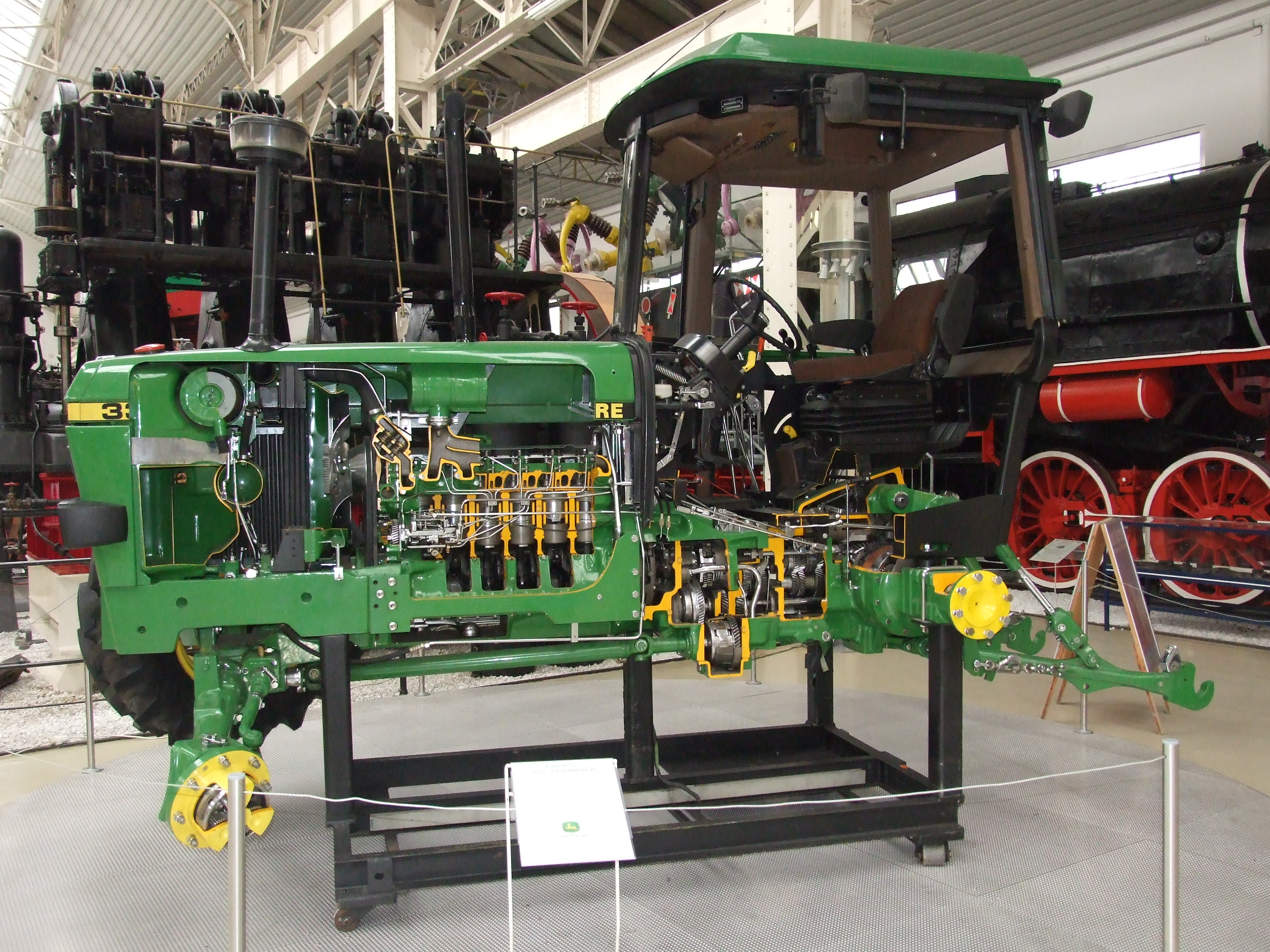
Cutaway of a John Deere tractor

In newer designs, unsynchronized transmission designs were replaced with synchronization or with continuously variable transmissions (CVTs). Either a synchronized manual transmission with enough available gear ratios (often achieved with dual ranges, high and low) or a CVT allow the engine speed to be matched to the desired final-drive speed, while keeping engine speed within the appropriate speed (as measured in rotations per minute or rpm) range for power generation (the working range) (whereas throttling back to achieve the desired final-drive speed is a trade-off that leaves the working range). The problems, solutions, and developments described here also describe the history of transmission evolution in semi-trailer trucks. The biggest difference is fleet turnover; whereas most of the old road tractors have long since been scrapped, many of the old farm tractors are still in use. Therefore, old transmission design and operation is primarily just of historical interest in trucking, whereas in farming it still often affects daily life.

== Hitches and power applications ==
The power produced by the engine must be transmitted to the implement or equipment to do the actual work intended for the equipment. This may be accomplished via a drawbar or hitch system if the implement is to be towed or otherwise pulled through the tractive power of the engine, or via a pulley or power takeoff system if the implement is stationary, or a combination of the two.

=== Drawbars ===
Plows and other tillage equipment are most commonly connected to the tractor via a drawbar. The classic drawbar is simply a steel bar attached to the tractor (or in some cases, as in the early Fordsons, cast as part of the rear transmission housing) to which the hitch of the implement was attached with a pin or by a loop and clevis. The implement could be readily attached and removed, allowing the tractor to be used for other purposes on a daily basis. If the tractor was equipped with a swinging drawbar, then it could be set at the center or offset from center to allow the tractor to run outside the path of the implement.

The drawbar system necessitated the implement having its own running gear (usually wheels) and in the case of a plow, chisel cultivator or harrow, some sort of lift mechanism to raise it out of the ground at turns or for transport. Drawbars necessarily posed a rollover risk depending on how the tractive torque was applied. The Fordson tractor was prone to roll backward due to an excessively short wheelbase. The linkage between the implement and the tractor usually had some slack which could lead to jerky starts and greater wear and tear on the tractor and the equipment.

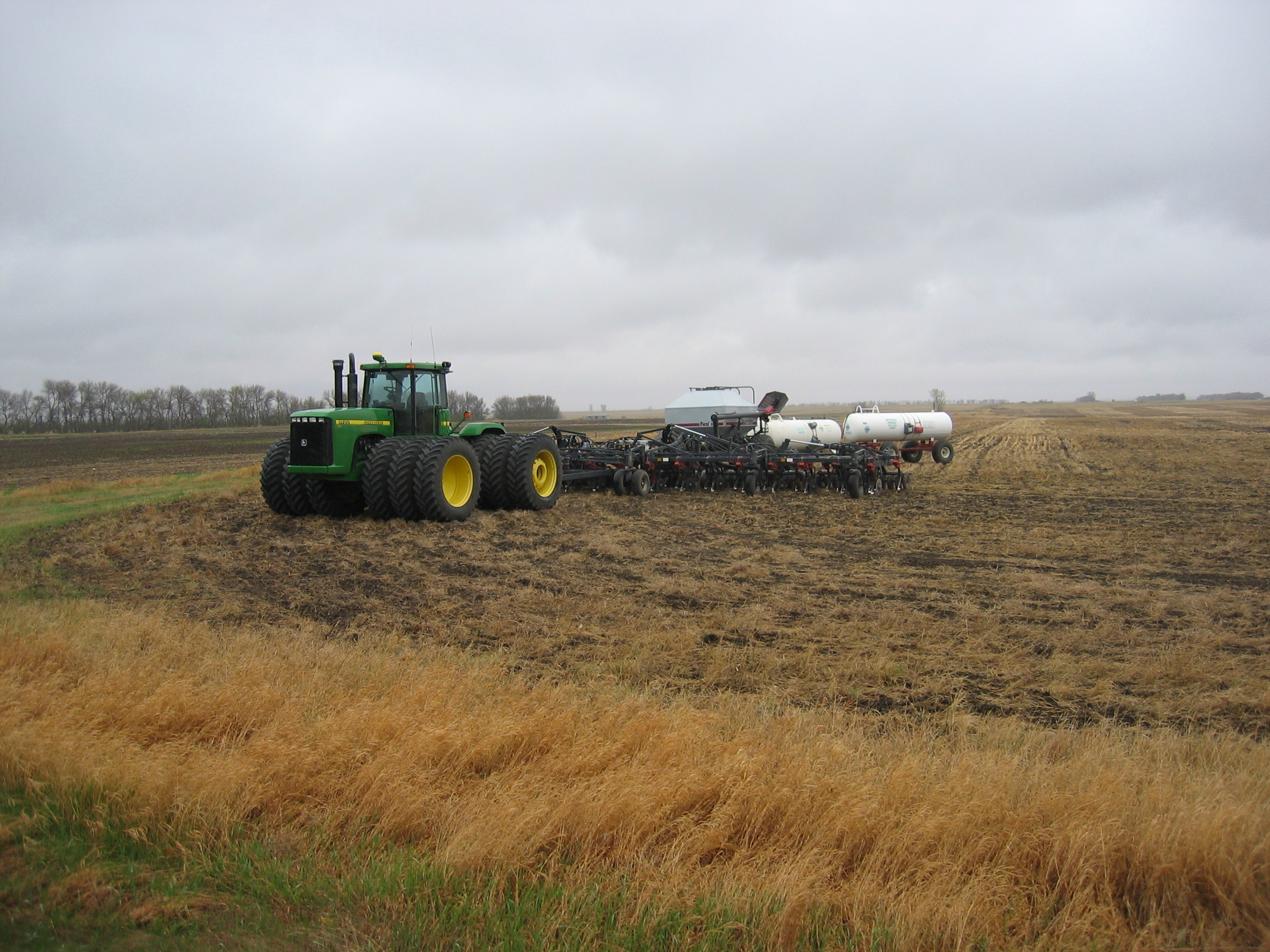
A large, modern John Deere model 9400 four-wheel drive tractor with tripled wheels and a drawbar-towed tool chain, including one-pass tillage equipment, planter and fertilizer applicator with tanks

Drawbars were appropriate to the dawn of mechanization, because they were very simple in concept and because as the tractor replaced the horse, existing horse-drawn implements usually already had running gear. As the history of mechanization progressed, the advantages of other hitching systems became apparent, leading to new developments (see below). Depending on the function for which a tractor is used, though, the drawbar is still one of the usual means of attaching an implement to a tractor (see photo at left).

=== Fixed mounts ===
Some tractor manufacturers produced matching equipment that could be directly mounted on the tractor. Examples included front-end loaders, belly mowers, row crop cultivators, corn pickers and corn planters. In most cases, these fixed mounts were proprietary and unique to each make of tractor, so an implement produced by John Deere, for example, could not be attached to a Minneapolis Moline tractor. Another disadvantage was mounting usually required some time and labor, resulting in the implement being semi-permanently attached with bolts or other mounting hardware. Usually, it was impractical to remove the implement and reinstall it on a day-to-day basis. As a result, the tractor was unavailable for other uses and dedicated to a single use for an appreciable period of time. An implement was generally mounted at the beginning of its season of use (such as tillage, planting or harvesting) and removed when the season ended.

=== Three-point and quick ===
The drawbar system was virtually the exclusive method of attaching implements (other than direct attachment to the tractor) before Harry Ferguson developed the three-point hitch. Equipment attached to the three-point hitch can be raised or lowered hydraulically with a control lever. The equipment attached to the three-point hitch is usually completely supported by the tractor. Another way to attach an implement is via a quick hitch, which is attached to the three-point hitch. This enables a single person to attach an implement quicker and put the person in less danger when attaching the implement.

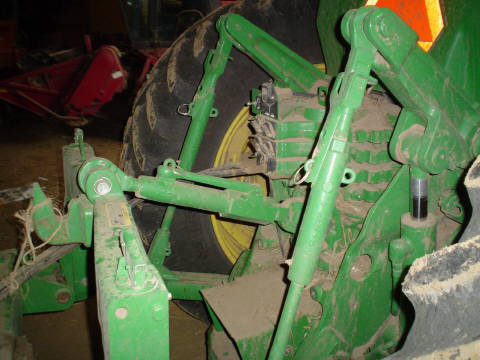
A modern three-point with a quick hitch attached

The three-point hitch revolutionized farm tractors and their implements. While the Ferguson System was still under patent, other manufacturers developed new hitching systems to try to fend off some of Ferguson's competitive advantage. For example, International Harvester's Farmall tractors gained a two-point "Fast Hitch", and John Deere had a power lift that was somewhat similar to the more flexible Ferguson invention. Once the patent protection expired on the three-point hitch, it became an industry standard.

Almost every tractor today features Ferguson's three-point linkage or a derivative of it. This hitch allows for easy attachment and detachment of implements while allowing the implement to function as a part of the tractor, almost as if it were attached by a fixed mount. Previously, when the implement hit an obstacle, the towing link broke or the tractor flipped over. Ferguson's idea was to combine a connection via two lower and one upper lift arms that were connected to a hydraulic lifting ram. The ram was, in turn, connected to the upper of the three links so the increased drag (as when a plough hits a rock) caused the hydraulics to lift the implement until the obstacle was passed.

Recently, Bobcat's patent on its front loader connection (inspired by these earlier systems) has expired, and compact tractors are now being outfitted with quick-connect attachments for their front-end loaders.

=== Power take-off systems and hydraulics ===
In addition to towing an implement or supplying tractive power through the wheels, most tractors have a means to transfer power to another machine, such as a baler, swather, or mower. Unless it functions solely by pulling it through or over the ground, a towed implement needs its own power source (such as a baler or combine with a separate engine) or else a means of transmitting power from the tractor to the mechanical operations of the equipment.

Early tractors used belts or cables wrapped around the flywheel or a separate belt pulley to power stationary equipment, such as a threshing machine, buzz saw, silage blower, or stationary baler. In most cases, it was impractical for the tractor and equipment to move with a flexible belt or cable between them, so this system required the tractor to remain in one location, with the work brought to the equipment, or the tractor to be relocated at each turn and the power set-up reapplied (as in cable-drawn plowing systems used in early steam tractor operations).

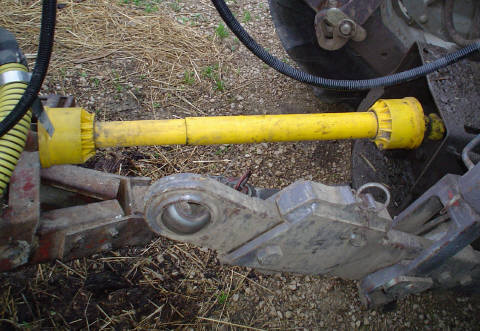
An implement connected to a tractor's power take-off (PTO) shaft

Modern tractors use a power take-off (PTO) shaft to provide rotary power to machinery that may be stationary or pulled. The PTO shaft generally is at the rear of the tractor, and can be connected to an implement that is either towed by a drawbar or a three-point hitch. This eliminates the need for a separate, implement-mounted power source, which is almost never seen in modern farm equipment. It is also optional to get a front PTO as well when buying a new tractor.

Virtually all modern tractors can also provide external hydraulic fluid and electrical power to the equipment they are towing, either by hoses or wires.

== Operation ==
Modern tractors have many electrical switches and levers in the cab for controlling the multitude of different functions available on the tractor.

=== Pedals ===
Some modern farm tractors retain a traditional manual transmission; increasingly they have hydraulically driven powershift transmissions and CVT, which vastly simplify operation.

Those with powershift transmissions have identical pedal arrangements on the floor for the operator to actuate, replacing a clutch pedal on the far left with an inching pedal that cuts off hydraulic flow to the clutches. Twinned brake pedals – one each for left and right side wheels – are placed together on the right side. Some have a pedal for a foot throttle on the far right. Unlike automobiles, throttle speed can also be controlled by a hand-operated lever ("hand throttle"), which may be set to a fixed position. This helps provide a constant speed in field work. It also helps provide continuous power for stationary tractors that are operating an implement by PTO shaft or axle driven belt. The foot throttle gives the operator more automobile-like control over the speed of a mobile tractor in any operation.

Some modern tractors also have (or offer as optional equipment) a button on the gear stick for controlling the clutch, in addition to the standard pedal, allowing for gear changes and the tractor to be brought to a stop without using the foot pedal to engage the clutch. Others have a button for temporarily increasing throttle speed to improve hydraulic flow to implements, such as a front end loader bucket.

Independent left and right brake pedals are provided to allow improved steering (by engaging the side one wishes to turn to, slowing or stopping its wheel) and improved traction in soft and slippery conditions (by transferring rotation to the wheel with better grip). Some users prefer to lock both pedals together, or utilize a partial lock that allows the left pedal to be depressed independently but engages both when the right is applied. This may be in the form of a swinging or sliding bolt that may be readily engaged or disengaged in the field without tools.

Foot pedal throttle control is mostly a returning feature of newer tractors. In the UK, foot pedal use to control engine speed while travelling on the road is mandatory. Some tractors, especially those designed for row-crop work, have a 'de-accelerator' pedal, which operates in the reverse fashion of an automobile throttle, slowing the engine when applied. This allows control over the speed of a tractor with its throttle set high for work, as when repeatedly slowing to make U-turns at the end of crop rows in fields.

A front-facing foot button is traditionally included just ahead of the driver's seat (designed to be pressed by the operator's heel) to engage the rear differential lock (diff-lock), which prevents wheel slip. The differential normally allows driving wheels to operate at their own speeds, as required, for example, by the different radius each takes in a turn. This allows the outside wheel to travel faster than the inside wheel, thereby traveling further during a turn. In low-traction conditions on a soft surface, the same mechanism can allow one wheel to slip, wasting its torque and further reducing traction. The differential lock overrides this, forcing both wheels to turn at the same speed, reducing wheel slip and improving traction. Care must be taken to unlock the differential before turning, usually by hitting the pedal a second time, since the tractor with good traction cannot perform a turn with the diff-lock engaged. In many modern tractors, this pedal is replaced with an electrical switch.

=== Levers and switches ===
Many functions once controlled with levers have been replaced with some model of electrical switch with the rise of indirect computer controlling of functions in modern tractors.

Until the late of the 1950s, tractors had a single register of gears, hence one gear stick, often with three to five forward gears and one reverse. Then, group gears were introduced, and another gear stick was added. Later, control of the forward-reverse direction was moved to a special stick attached at the side of the steering wheel, which allowed forward or reverse travel in any gear. Now, with CVTs or other gear types, fewer sticks control the transmission, and some are replaced with electrical switches or are totally computer-controlled.

The three-point hitch was controlled with a lever for adjusting the position, or as with the earliest ones, just the function for raising or lowering the hitch. With modern electrical systems, it is often replaced with a potentiometer for the lower bound position and another one for the upper bound, and a switch allowing automatic adjustment of the hitch between these settings.

The external hydraulics also originally had levers, but now are often replaced with some form of electrical switch; the same is true for the power take-off shaft.

== Safety ==
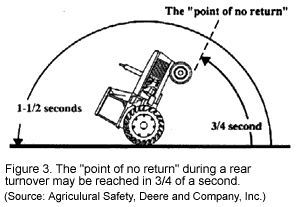
John Deere tractor rollover diagram

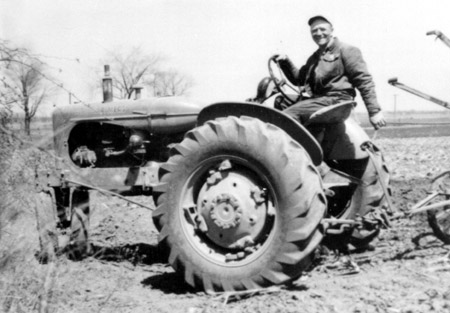
A classic Allis-Chalmers WD row crop tractor, absent any form of rollover protection

Agriculture in the United States is one of the most hazardous industries, only surpassed by mining and construction. No other farm machine is so identified with the hazards of production agriculture as the tractor. Tractor-related injuries account for approximately 32% of the fatalities and 6% of the nonfatal injuries in agriculture. Over 50% is attributed to tractor overturns.

The roll-over protection structure (ROPS) and seat belt, when worn, are the most important safety devices to protect operators from death during tractor overturns.

Modern tractors have a ROPS to prevent an operator from being crushed when overturning. This is especially important in open-air tractors, where the ROPS is a steel beam that extends above the operator's seat. For tractors with operator cabs, the ROPS is part of the frame of the cab. A ROPS with enclosed cab further reduces the likelihood of serious injury because the operator is protected by the sides and windows of the cab.

These structures were first required by legislation in Sweden in 1959. Before they were required, some farmers died when their tractors rolled on top of them. Row-crop tractors, before ROPS, were particularly dangerous because of their 'tricycle' design with the two front wheels spaced close together and angled inward toward the ground. Some farmers were killed by rollovers while operating tractors along steep slopes. Others have been killed while attempting to tow or pull an excessive load from above axle height, or when cold weather caused the tires to freeze to the ground, in both cases causing the tractor to pivot around the rear axle. ROPS were first required in the United States in 1986, non-retroactively. ROPS adoption by farmers is thus incomplete. To treat this problem, CROPS (cost-effective roll-over protection structures) have been developed to encourage farmers to retrofit older tractors.

For the ROPS to work as designed, the operator must stay within its protective frame and wear the seat belt.

In addition to ROPS, U.S. manufacturers add instructional seats on tractors with enclosed cabs. The tractors have a ROPS with seatbelts for both the operator and passenger. This instructional seat is intended to be used for training new tractor operators, but can also be used to diagnose machine problems. The misuse of an instructional seat increases the likelihood of injury, especially when children are transported. The International Organization for Standardization's ISO standard 23205:2014 specifies the minimum design and performance requirements for an instructional seat and states that the instructional seat is neither intended for, nor is it designed for use by children. Despite this, upwards of 40% of farm families give their children rides on tractors, often using these instructional seats.

== Applications and variations ==
=== Farm ===
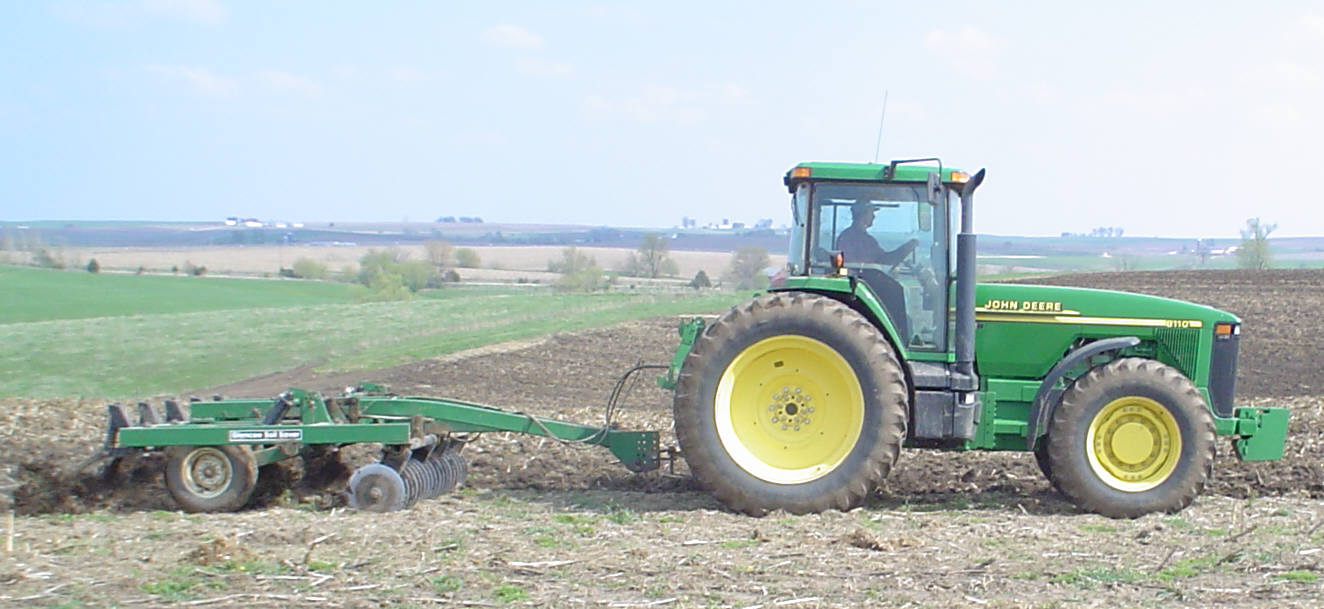
A modern John Deere 8110 Farm Tractor plowing a field using a chisel plow

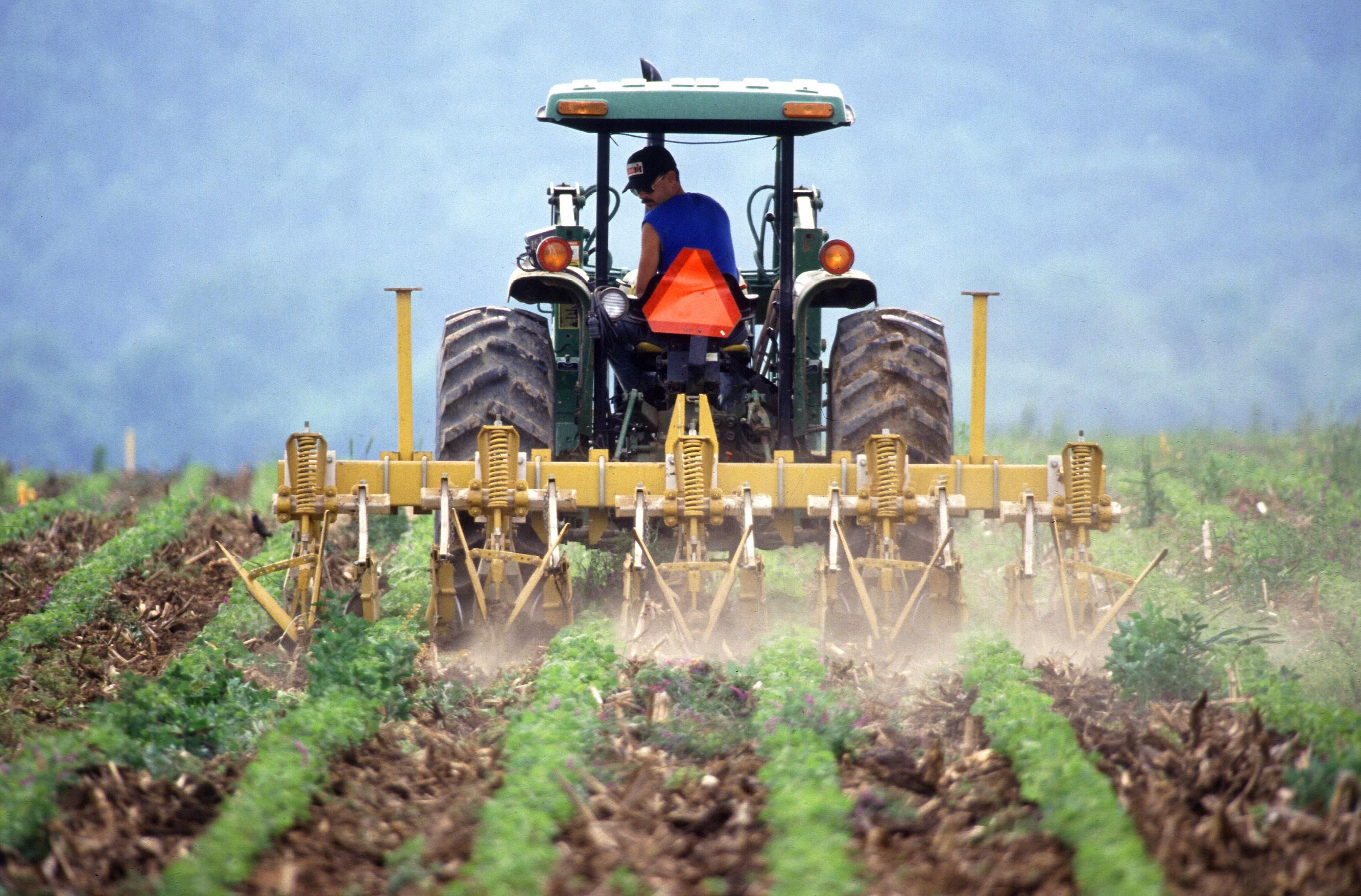
A tractor pulling a tiller

The most common use of the term "tractor" is for the vehicles used on farms. The farm tractor is used for pulling or pushing agricultural machinery or trailers, for plowing, tilling, disking, harrowing, planting, and similar tasks.

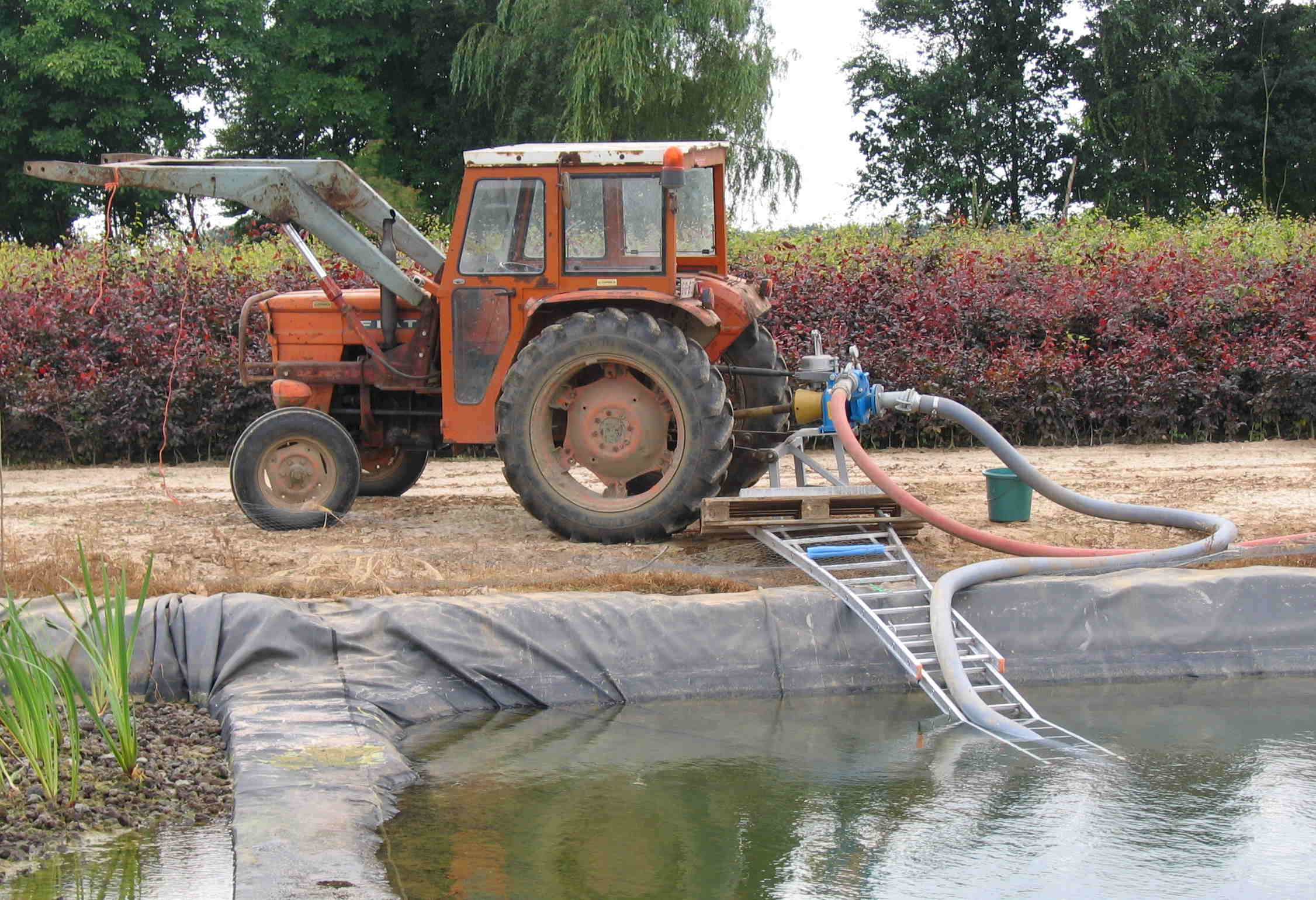
A farm tractor used to power a pump for irrigating a plot of land

A variety of specialty farm tractors have been developed for particular uses. These include "row crop" tractors with adjustable tread width to allow the tractor to pass down rows of cereals, maize, tomatoes or other crops without crushing the plants, "wheatland" or "standard" tractors with fixed wheels and a lower center of gravity for plowing and other heavy field work for broadcast crops, and "high crop" tractors with adjustable tread and increased ground clearance, often used in the cultivation of cotton and other high-growing row crop plant operations, and "utility tractors", typically smaller tractors with a low center of gravity and short turning radius, used for general purposes around the farmstead. Many utility tractors are used for nonfarm grading, landscape maintenance and excavation purposes, particularly with loaders, backhoes, pallet forks and similar devices. Small garden or lawn tractors designed for suburban and semirural gardening and landscape maintenance are produced in a variety of configurations, and also find numerous uses on a farmstead.

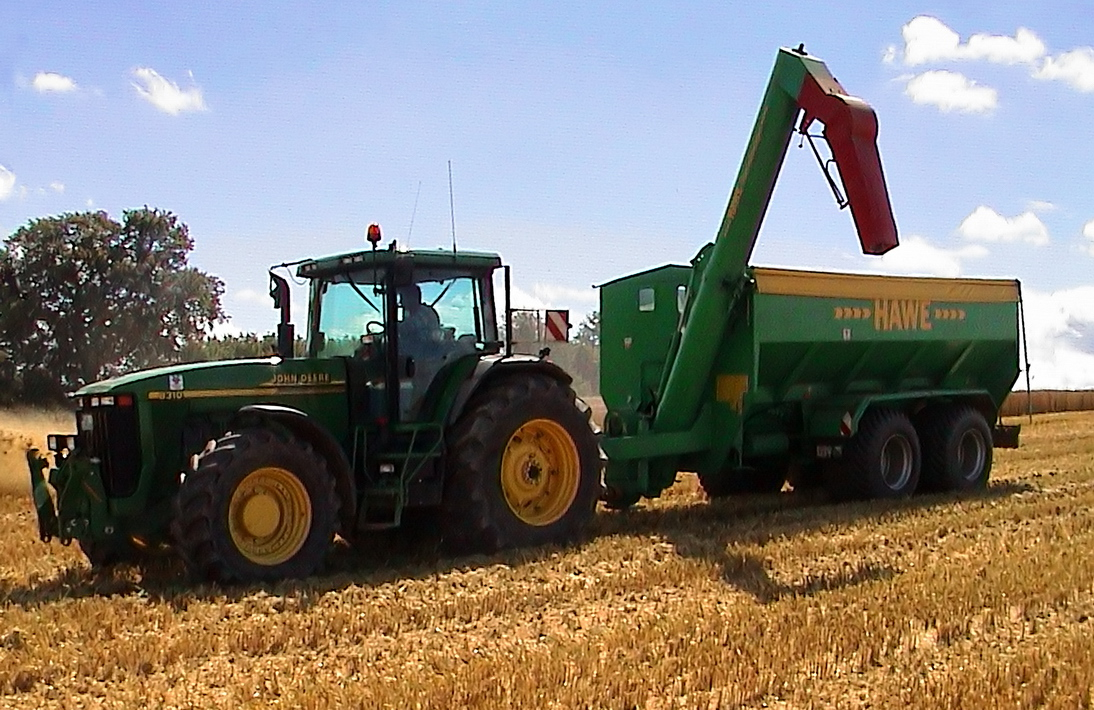
A tractor with an auger wagon

Some farm-type tractors are found elsewhere than on farms: with large universities' gardening departments, in public parks, or for highway workman use with blowtorch cylinders strapped to the sides and a pneumatic drill air compressor permanently fastened over the power take-off. These are often fitted with grass (turf) tyres which are less damaging to soft surfaces than agricultural tires.

==== Precision ====
Space technology has been incorporated into agriculture in the form of GPS devices and robust on-board computers installed as optional features on farm tractors. These technologies are used in modern, precision farming techniques. The spin-offs from the space race have actually facilitated automation in plowing and the use of autosteer systems (drone on tractors that are manned but only steered at the end of a row), the idea being to neither overlap and use more fuel nor leave streaks when performing jobs such as cultivating. Several tractor companies have also been working on producing a driverless tractor.

=== Engineering ===
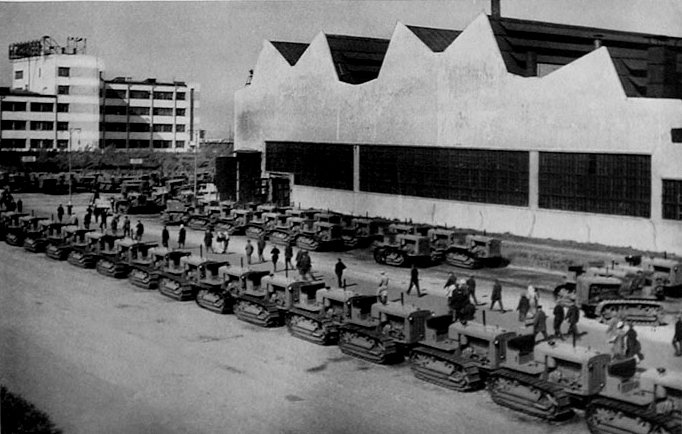
A tractor factory in Chelyabinsk, in the Soviet Union, circa 1930

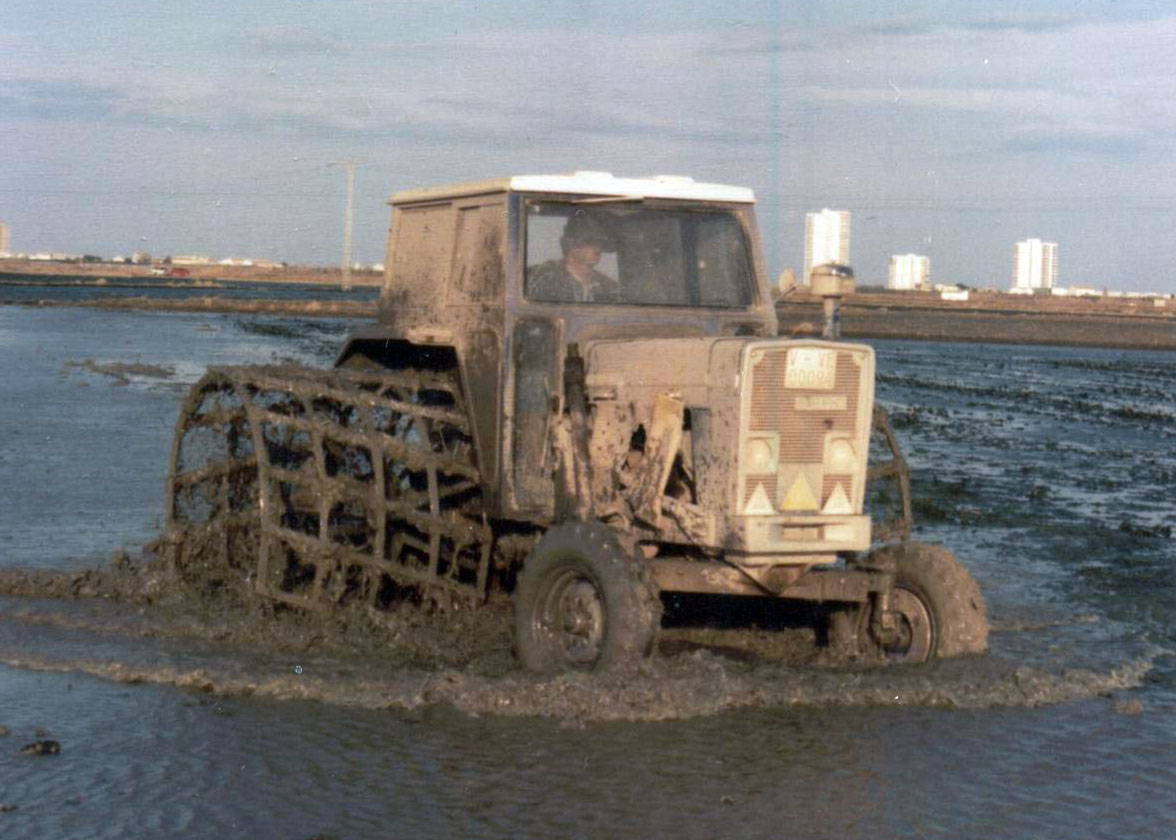
Ebro farm tractor with steel wheel extensions. This arrangement is often used in muddy conditions that are found in paddy farming of rice.

The durability and engine power of tractors made them very suitable for engineering tasks. Tractors can be fitted with engineering tools such as dozer blades, buckets, hoes, rippers, etc. The most common attachments for the front of a tractor are dozer blades or buckets. When attached to engineering tools, the tractor is called an engineering vehicle.

A bulldozer is a track-type tractor with a blade attached in the front and a rope-winch behind. Bulldozers are very powerful tractors and have excellent ground-hold, as their main tasks are to push or drag.

Bulldozers have been further modified over time to evolve into new machines which are capable of working in ways that the original bulldozer can not. One example is that loader tractors were created by removing the blade and substituting a large volume bucket and hydraulic arms which can raise and lower the bucket, thus making it useful for scooping up earth, rock and similar loose material to load it into trucks.

A front-loader or loader is a tractor with an engineering tool which consists of two hydraulic powered arms on either side of the front engine compartment and a tilting implement. This is usually a wide-open box called a bucket, but other common attachments are a pallet fork and a bale grappler.

Other modifications to the original bulldozer include making the machine smaller to let it operate in small work areas where movement is limited. Also, tiny wheeled loaders, officially called skid-steer loaders, but nicknamed "Bobcat" after the original manufacturer, are particularly suited for small excavation projects in confined areas.

=== Backhoe ===
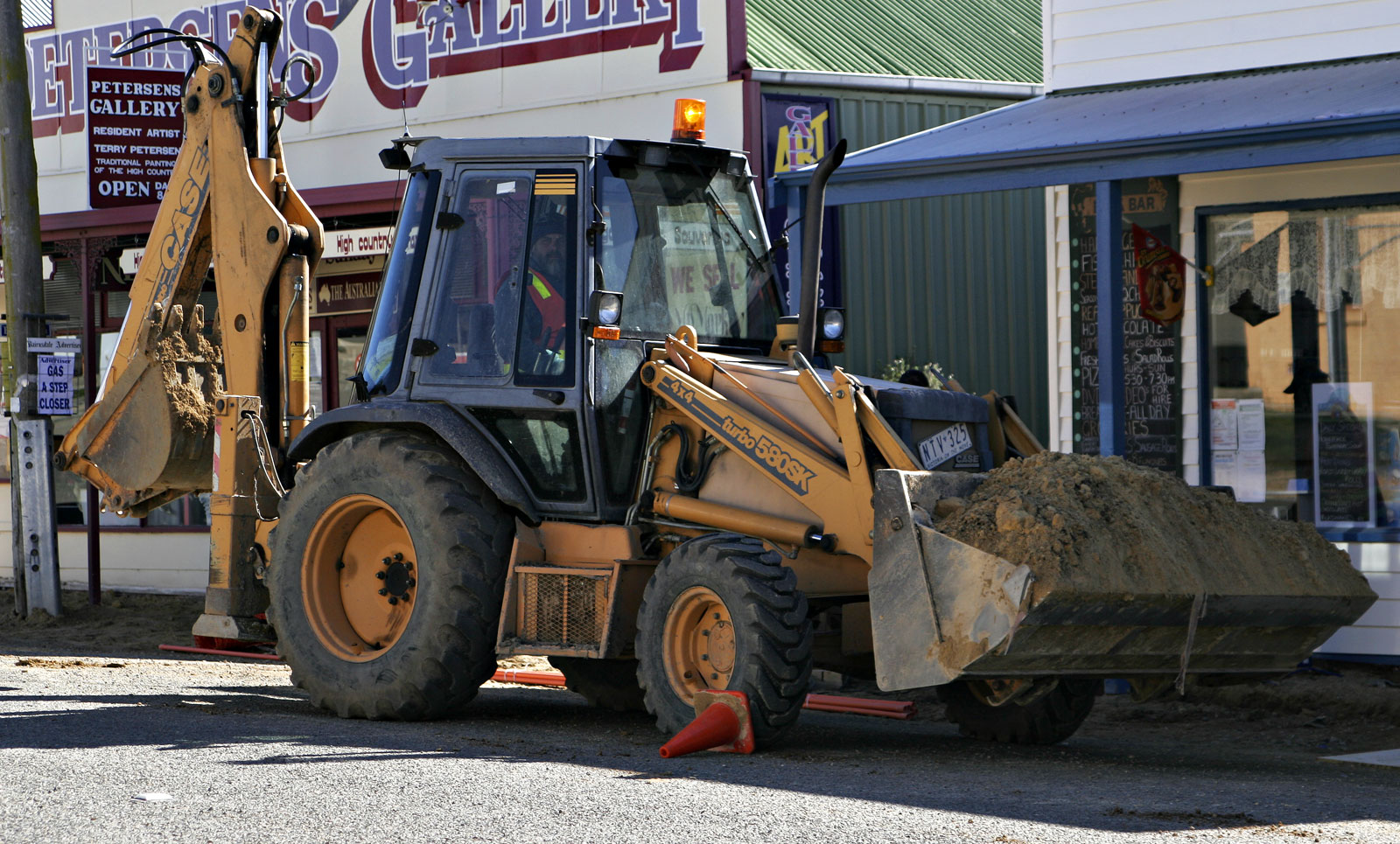
A common Case backhoe loader, with backhoe on the rear and loader bucket in front

The most common variation of the classic farm tractor is the backhoe, also called a backhoe-loader. As the name implies, it has a loader assembly on the front and a backhoe on the back. Backhoes attach to a three-point hitch on farm or industrial tractors. Industrial tractors are often heavier in construction, particularly with regards to the use of a steel grill for protection from rocks and the use of construction tires. When the backhoe is permanently attached, the machine usually has a seat that can swivel to the rear to face the hoe controls. Removable backhoe attachments almost always have a separate seat on the attachment.

Backhoe-loaders are very common and can be used for a wide variety of tasks: construction, small demolitions, light transportation of building materials, powering building equipment, digging holes, loading trucks, breaking asphalt and paving roads. Some buckets have retractable bottoms, enabling them to empty their loads more quickly and efficiently. Buckets with retractable bottoms are also often used for grading and scratching off sand. The front assembly may be a removable attachment or permanently mounted. Often the bucket can be replaced with other devices or tools.

Their relatively small frames and precise controls make backhoe-loaders very useful and common in urban engineering projects, such as construction and repairs in areas too small for larger equipment. Their versatility and compact size make them one of the most popular urban construction vehicles.

In the UK and Ireland, the word "JCB" is used colloquially as a genericized trademark for any such type of engineering vehicle. The term JCB now appears in the Oxford English Dictionary, although it is still legally a trademark of J. C. Bamford Ltd. The term "digger" is also commonly used.

=== Compact utility ===
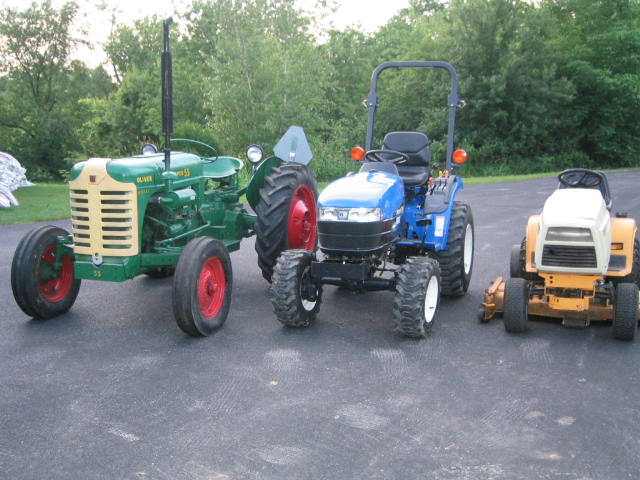
The relative sizes of a 30 hp (22 kW) Oliver Super 55 farm tractor, a 24 hp (18 kW) diesel New Holland compact utility tractor, and a Cub Cadet lawn tractor

A compact utility tractor (CUT) is a smaller version of an agricultural tractor, but designed primarily for landscaping and estate management tasks, rather than for planting and harvesting on a commercial scale. Typical CUTs range from 20–50 hp (15–37 kW) with available power take-off (PTO) power ranging from 15–45 hp (11–34 kW). CUTs are often equipped with both a mid-mounted and a standard rear PTO, especially those below 40 hp (30 kW). The mid-mount PTO shaft typically rotates at/near 2000 rpm and is typically used to power mid-mount finish mowers, front-mounted snow blowers or front-mounted rotary brooms. The rear PTO is standardized at 540 rpm for the North American markets, but in some parts of the world, a dual 540/1000 rpm PTO is standard, and implements are available for either standard in those markets.

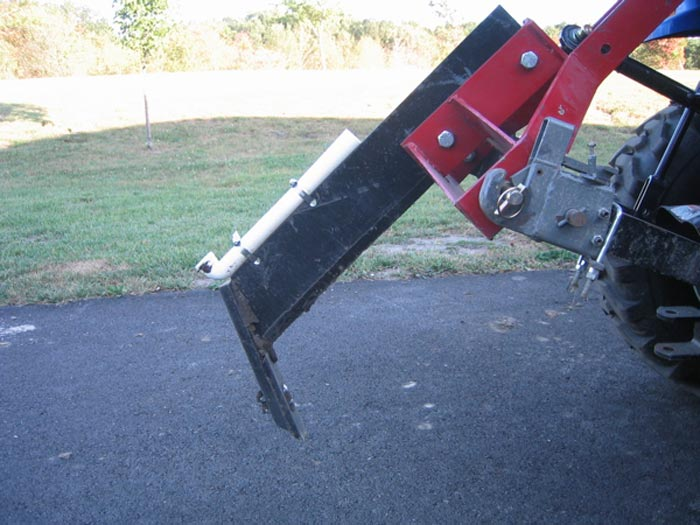
Howse brand modular subsoiler mounted to a tractor

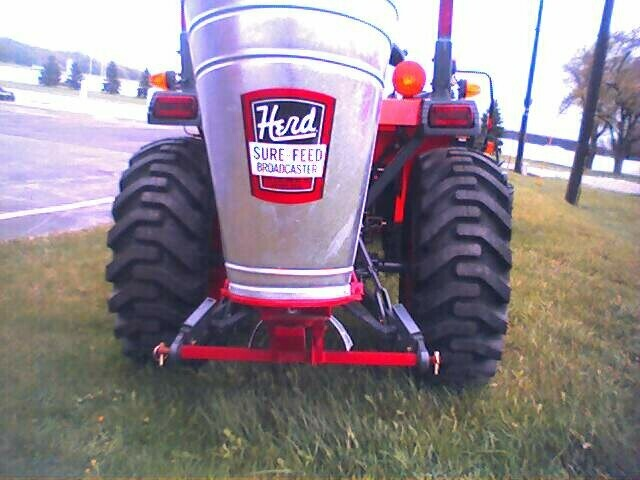
Broadcast seeder mounted to a Kubota CUT

One of the most common attachments for a CUT is the front-end loader or FEL. Like the larger agricultural tractors, a CUT will have an adjustable, hydraulically controlled three-point hitch. Typically, a CUT will have four-wheel drive, or more correctly four-wheel assist. Modern CUTs often feature hydrostatic transmissions, but many variants of gear-drive transmissions are also offered from low priced, simple gear transmissions to synchronized transmissions to advanced glide-shift transmissions. All modern CUTs feature government-mandated roll over protection structures just like agricultural tractors. The most well-known brands in North America include Kubota, John Deere Tractor, New Holland Ag, Case-Farmall and Massey Ferguson. Although less common, compact backhoes are often attached to compact utility tractors.

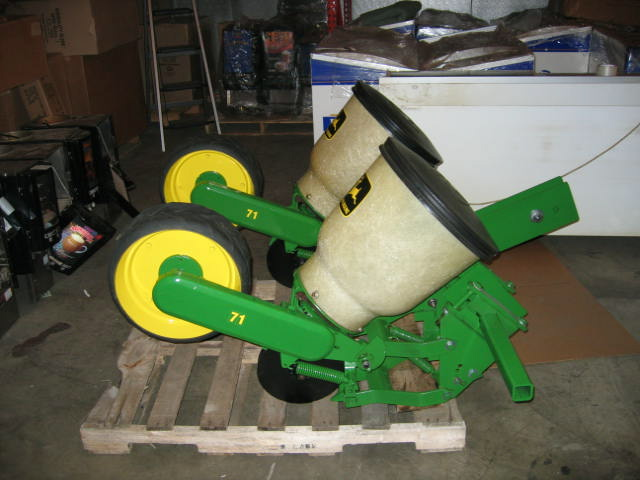
JD 71 Flexi Planter for tractors 20–50 horsepower (15–37 kW)

Compact utility tractors require special, smaller implements than full-sized agricultural tractors. Very common implements include the box blade, the grader blade, the landscape rake, the post hole digger (or post hole auger), the rotary cutter (slasher or a brush hog), a mid- or rear-mount finish mower, a broadcast seeder, a subsoiler and the rototiller (rotary tiller). In northern climates, a rear-mounted snow blower is very common; some smaller CUT models are available with front-mounted snow blowers powered by mid-PTO shafts. Implement brands outnumber tractor brands, so CUT owners have a wide selection of implements.

For small-scale farming or large-scale gardening, some planting and harvesting implements are sized for CUTs. One- and two-row planting units are commonly available, as are cultivators, sprayers and different types of seeders (slit, rotary and drop). One of the first CUTs offered for small farms of three to 30 acres and for small jobs on larger farms was a three-wheeled unit, with the rear wheel being the drive wheel, offered by Sears & Roebuck in 1954 and priced at $598 for the basic model.

An even smaller variant of the compact utility tractor is the subcompact utility tractor. Although these tractors are often barely larger than a riding lawn mower, these tractors have all the same features of a compact tractor, such as a three-point hitch, power steering, four-wheel-drive, and front-end loader. These tractors are generally marketed towards homeowners who intend to mostly use them for lawn mowing, with the occasional light landscaping task.

=== Standard ===
The earliest tractors were called "standard" tractors, and were intended almost solely for plowing and harrowing before planting, which were difficult tasks for humans and draft animals. They were characterized by a low, rearward seating position, fixed-width tread, and low ground clearance. These early tractors were cumbersome, and ill-suited to enter a field of planted row crops for weed control. The "standard" tractor definition is no longer in current use. However, tractors with fixed wheel spacing and a low center of gravity are well-suited as loaders, forklifts and backhoes, so that the configuration continues in use without the "standard" nomenclature.

=== Row-crop ===
A general-purpose or row-crop tractor is tailored specifically to the growing of crops grown in rows, and most especially to cultivating these crops. These tractors are universal machines, capable of both primary tillage and cultivation of a crop.

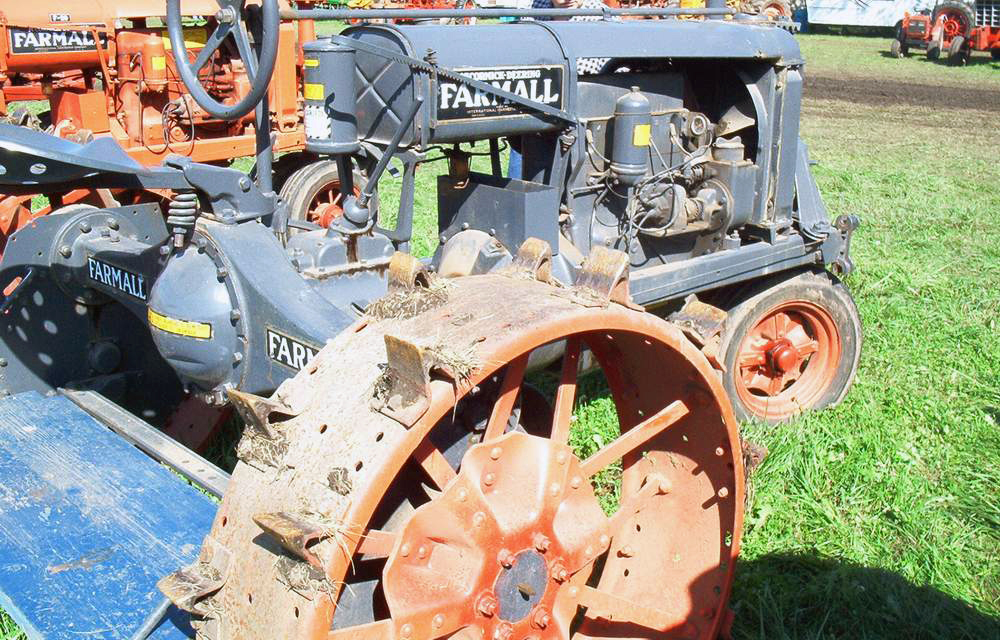
A Farmall "Regular"

The row-crop tractor category evolved rather than appearing overnight, but the International Harvester (IH) Farmall is often considered the "first" tractor of the category. Some earlier tractors of the 1910s and 1920s approached the form factor from the heavier side, as did motorized cultivators from the lighter side, but the Farmall brought all of the salient features together into one package, with a capable distribution network to ensure its commercial success. In the new form factor that the Farmall popularized, the cultivator was mounted in the front so it was easily visible. Additionally, the tractor had a narrow front end; the front tires were spaced very closely and angled in toward the bottom. The back wheels straddled two rows with their spacing adjustable depending on row spacing, and the unit could cultivate four rows at once. Where wide front wheels were used, they often could be adjusted as well. Tractors with non-adjustable spacing were called "standard" or "wheatland", and were chiefly meant for pulling plows or other towed implements, typically with a lower overall tractor height than row-crop models.

From 1924 until 1963, Farmalls were the largest selling row-crop tractors.

To compete, John Deere designed the Model C, which had a wide front and could cultivate three rows at once. Only 112 prototypes were made, as Deere realized it would lose sales to Farmall if its model did less. In 1928, Deere released the Model C anyway, only as the Model GP (General Purpose) to avoid confusion with the Model D when ordered over the then unclear telephone.

Oliver refined its "Row Crop" model early in 1930. Until 1935, the 18–27 was Oliver–Hart-Parr's only row-crop tractor.

Many Oliver row-crop models are referred to as "Oliver Row Crop 77", "Oliver Row Crop 88", etc.

Many early row-crop tractors had a tricycle design with two closely spaced front tires, and some even had a single front tire. This made it dangerous to operate on the side of a steep hill; as a result, many farmers died from tractor rollovers. Also, early row-crop tractors had no rollover protection system (ROPS), meaning if the tractor flipped back, the operator could be crushed. Sweden was the first country which passed legislation requiring ROPS, in 1959.

Over 50% of tractor related injuries and deaths are attributed to tractor rollover.

Canadian agricultural equipment manufacturer Versatile makes row-crop tractors that are 265 to 365 horsepower (198 to 272 kW); powered by an 8.9 liter Cummins Diesel engine.

Case IH and New Holland of CNH Industrial both produce high horsepower front-wheel-assist row crop tractors with available rear tracks. Case IH also has a 500 hp (370 kW) four-wheel drive track system called Rowtrac.

John Deere has an extensive line of available row crop tractors ranging from 140 to 400 horsepower (100 to 300 kW).

Modern row crop tractors have rollover protection systems in the form of a reinforced cab or a roll bar.

=== Garden ===
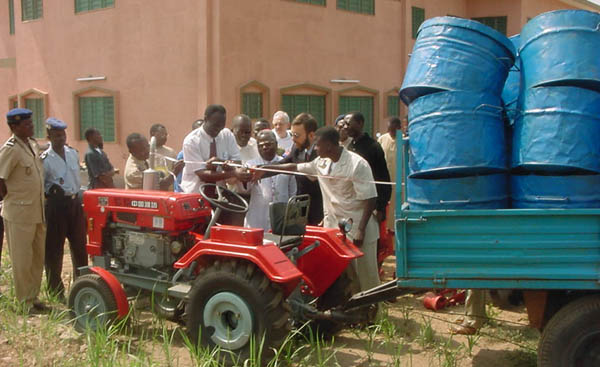
A garden tractor towing a cargo cart

Garden tractors, sometimes called lawn tractors, are small, light tractors designed for use in domestic gardens, lawns, and small estates. Lawn tractors are designed for cutting grass and snow removal, while garden tractors are for small property cultivation. In the U.S., the term riding lawn mower today often is used to refer to mid- or rear-engined machines. Front-engined tractor layout machines designed primarily for cutting grass and light towing are called lawn tractors; heavier-duty tractors of similar size are garden tractors. Garden tractors are capable of mounting a wider array of attachments than lawn tractors. Unlike lawn tractors and rear-engined riding mowers, garden tractors are powered by horizontal-crankshaft engines with a belt-drive to transaxle-type transmissions (usually of four or five speeds, although some may also have two-speed reduction gearboxes, drive-shafts, or hydrostatic or hydraulic drives). Garden tractors from Wheel Horse, Cub Cadet, Economy (Power King), John Deere, Massey Ferguson and Case Ingersoll are built in this manner. The engines are generally one- or two-cylinder petrol (gasoline) engines, although diesel engine models are also available, especially in Europe. Typically, diesel-powered garden tractors are larger and heavier-duty than gasoline-powered units and compare more similarly to compact utility tractors.

Visually, the distinction between a garden tractor and a lawn tractor is often hard to make – generally, garden tractors are more sturdily built, with stronger frames, 12-inch or larger wheels mounted with multiple lugs (most lawn tractors have a single bolt or clip on the hub), heavier transaxles, and ability to accommodate a wide range of front, belly, and rear mounted attachments.

=== Two-wheel ===
Although most people think primarily of four-wheel vehicles when they think of tractors, a tractor may have one or more axles. The key benefit is the power itself, which only takes one axle to provide. Single-axle tractors, more often called two-wheel tractors or walk-behind tractors, have had many users since the introduction of the internal combustion engine tractors. They tend to be small and affordable, this was especially true before the 1960s when a walk-behind tractor could often be more affordable than a two-axle tractor of comparable power. Today's compact utility tractors and advanced garden tractors may negate most of that market advantage, but two-wheel tractors still have a following, especially among those who already own one. Countries where two-wheel tractors are especially prevalent today include Thailand, China, Bangladesh, India, and other Southeast Asia countries. Most two-wheel tractors today are specialty tractors made for one purpose, such as snow blowers, push tillers, and self propelled push mowers.

=== Orchard ===
Tractors tailored to use in fruit orchards typically have features suited to passing under tree branches with impunity. These include a lower overall profile; reduced tree-branch-snagging risk (via underslung exhaust pipes rather than smoke-stack-style exhaust, and large sheetmetal cowlings and fairings that allow branches to deflect and slide off rather than catch); spark arrestors on the exhaust tips; and often wire cages to protect the operator from snags.

=== Automobile conversions and other homemade versions ===
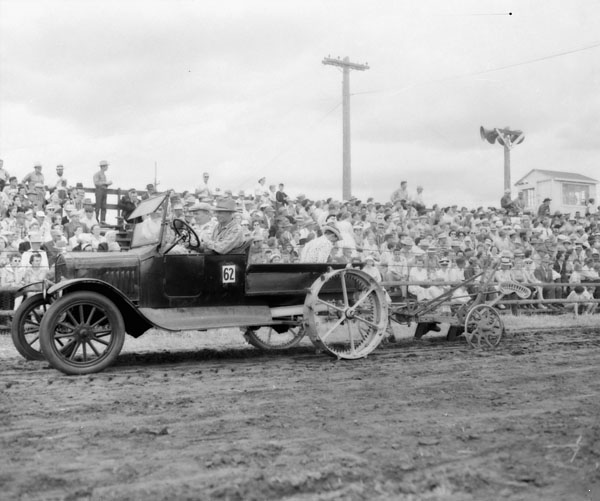
A Model T tractor pulling a plow

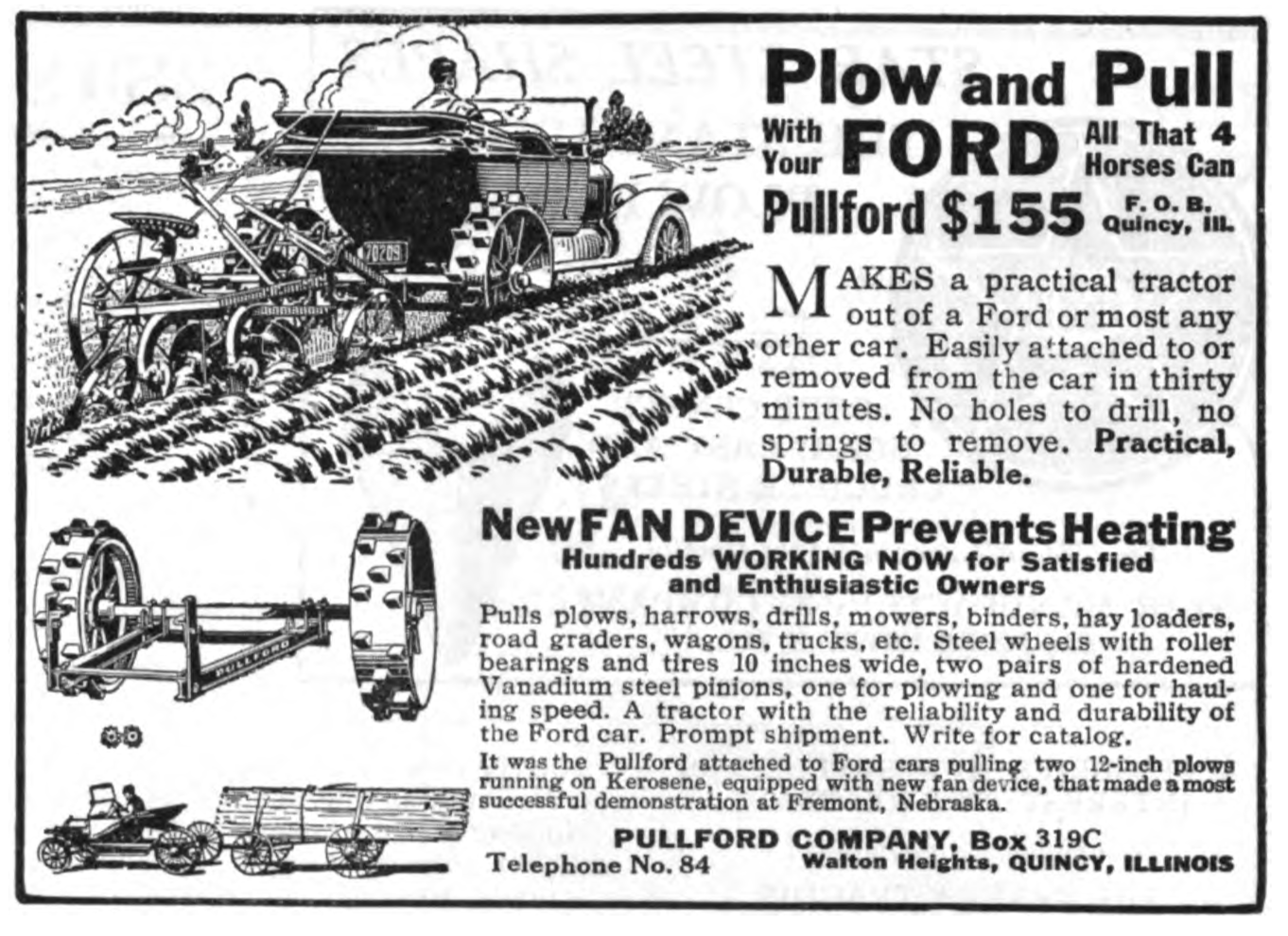
An advertisement for auto-to-tractor conversion kits, 1918

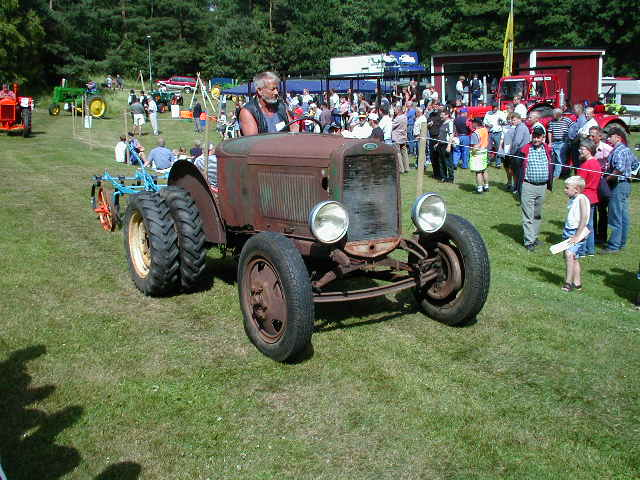
A Ford rebuilt to an EPA tractor

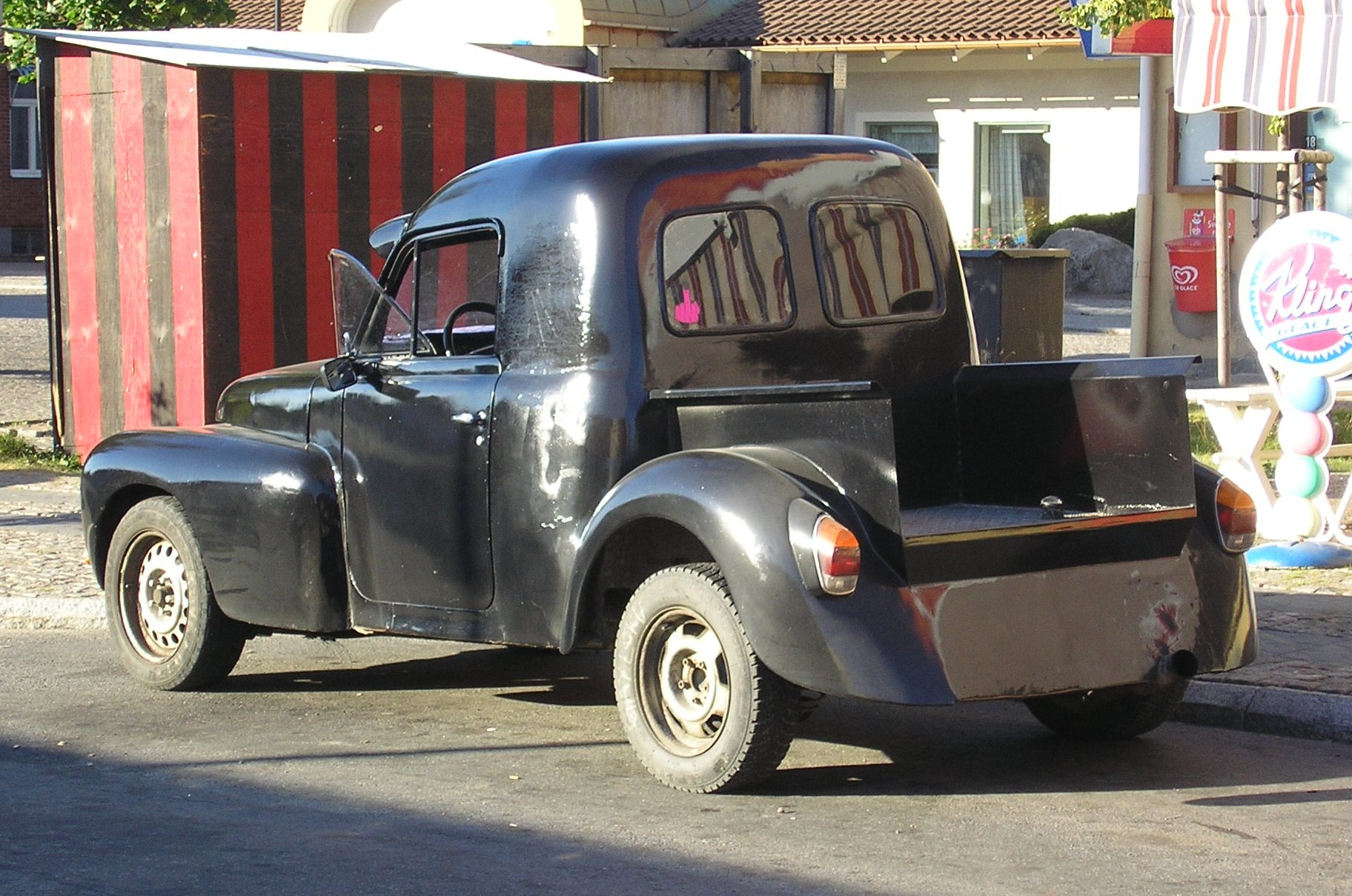
A Volvo Duett rebuilt to an EPA tractor, no longer intended for use as a farm vehicle

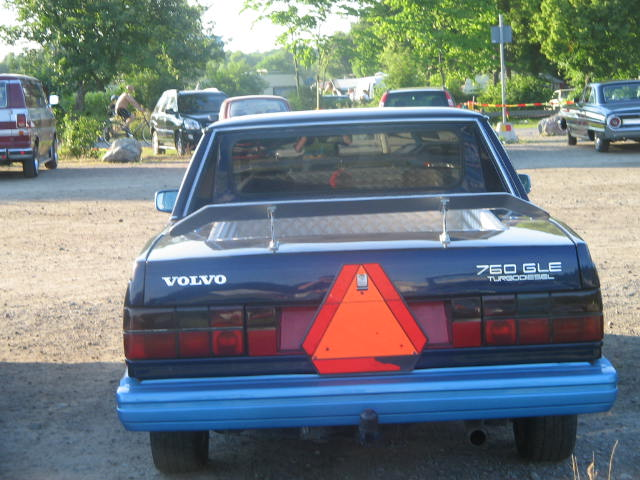
A "tractor" based on Volvo 760, with a slow-moving–vehicle triangle and a longer boot

The ingenuity of farm mechanics, coupled in some cases with OEM or aftermarket assistance, has often resulted in the conversion of automobiles for use as farm tractors. In the United States, this trend was especially strong from the 1910s through 1950s. It began early in the development of vehicles powered by internal combustion engines, with blacksmiths and amateur mechanics tinkering in their shops. Especially during the interwar period, dozens of manufacturers (Montgomery Ward among them) marketed aftermarket kits for converting Ford Model Ts for use as tractors. (These were sometimes called 'Hoover wagons' during the Great Depression, although this term was usually reserved for automobiles converted to horse-drawn buggy use when gasoline was unavailable or unaffordable. During the same period, another common name was "Doodlebug", after the popular kit by the same name.) Ford even considered producing an "official" optional kit. Many Model A Fords also were converted for this purpose. In later years, some farm mechanics have been known to convert more modern trucks or cars for use as tractors, more often as curiosities or for recreational purposes (rather than out of the earlier motives of pure necessity or frugality).

During World War II, a shortage of tractors in Sweden led to the development of the so-called EPA tractor (EPA was a chain of discount stores and it was often used to signify something lacking in quality). An EPA tractor was simply an automobile, truck, or lorry, with the passenger space cut off behind the front seats, equipped with two gearboxes in a row. When done to an older car with a ladder frame, the result was similar to a tractor and could be used as one. After the war it remained popular as a way for young people without a driver's license to own something similar to a car. Since it was legally seen as a tractor, it could be driven from 16 years of age and only required a tractor license. Eventually, the legal loophole was closed and no new EPA tractors were allowed to be made, but the remaining ones were still legal, which led to inflated prices and many protests from people who preferred EPA tractors to ordinary cars.

The Swedish government eventually replaced them with the so called "A-tractor" which now had its speed limited to 30 km/h and allowed people aged 16 and older to drive the cars with a moped license.

The German occupation of Italy during World War II resulted in a severe shortage of mechanized farm equipment. The destruction of tractors was a sort of scorched-earth strategy used to reduce the independence of the conquered. The shortage of tractors in that area of Europe was the origin of Lamborghini. The war was also the inspiration for dual-purpose vehicles such as the Land Rover. Based on the Jeep, the company made a vehicle that combined PTO, tillage, 4wd, and transportation.

In March 1975, a similar type of vehicle was introduced in Sweden, the A tractor [from arbetstraktor (work tractor)]; the main difference is an A tractor has a top speed of 30 km/h. This is usually done by fitting two gearboxes in a row and only using one. The Volvo Duett was, for a long time, the primary choice for conversion to an EPA or A tractor, but since supplies have dried up, other cars have been used, in most cases another Volvo. The SFRO is a Swedish organization advocating homebuilt and modified vehicles.

Another type of homemade tractors are ones that are fabricated from scratch. The "from scratch" description is relative, as often individual components will be repurposed from earlier vehicles or machinery (e.g., engines, gearboxes, axle housings), but the tractor's overall chassis is essentially designed and built by the owner (e.g., a frame is welded from bar stock – channel stock, angle stock, flat stock, etc.). As with automobile conversions, the heyday of this type of tractor, at least in developed economies, lies in the past, when there were large populations of blue-collar workers for whom metalworking and farming were prevalent parts of their lives. (For example, many 19th- and 20th-century New England and Midwestern machinists and factory workers had grown up on farms.) Backyard fabrication was a natural activity to them (whereas it might seem daunting to most people today).

=== Nomenclature ===
The term "tractor" (US and Canada) or "tractor unit" (UK) is also applied to:

- Road tractors, tractor units or traction heads, familiar as the front end of an articulated lorry / semi-trailer truck. They are heavy-duty vehicles with large engines and several axles.
  - The majority of these tractors are designed to pull long semi-trailers, most often to transport freight over a significant distance, and is connected to the trailer with a fifth wheel coupling. In England, this type of "tractor" is often called an "artic cab" (short for "articulated" cab).
  - A minority is the ballast tractor, whose load is hauled from a drawbar.
- Pushback tractors are used on airports to move aircraft on the ground, most commonly pushing aircraft away from their parking stands.
- Locomotive tractors (engines) or rail car movers – the amalgamation of machines, electrical generators, controls and devices that comprise the traction component of railway vehicles
- Artillery tractors – vehicles used to tow artillery pieces of varying weights.
- NASA and other space agencies use very large tractors to move large launch vehicles and Space Shuttles between their hangars and launch pads.
- A pipe-tractor is a device used for conveying advanced instruments into pipes for measurement and data logging, and the purging of well holes, sewer pipes and other inaccessible tubes.
Non-agricultural tractors

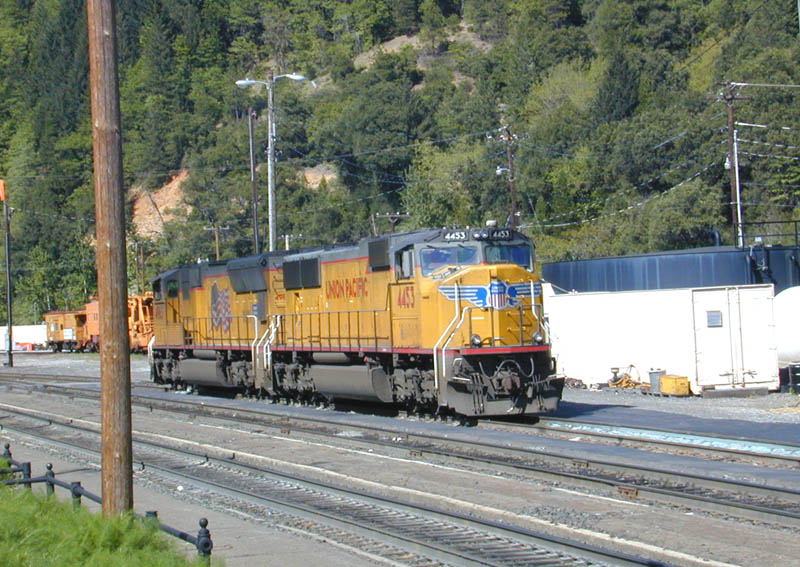
Diesel–electric locomotive at work

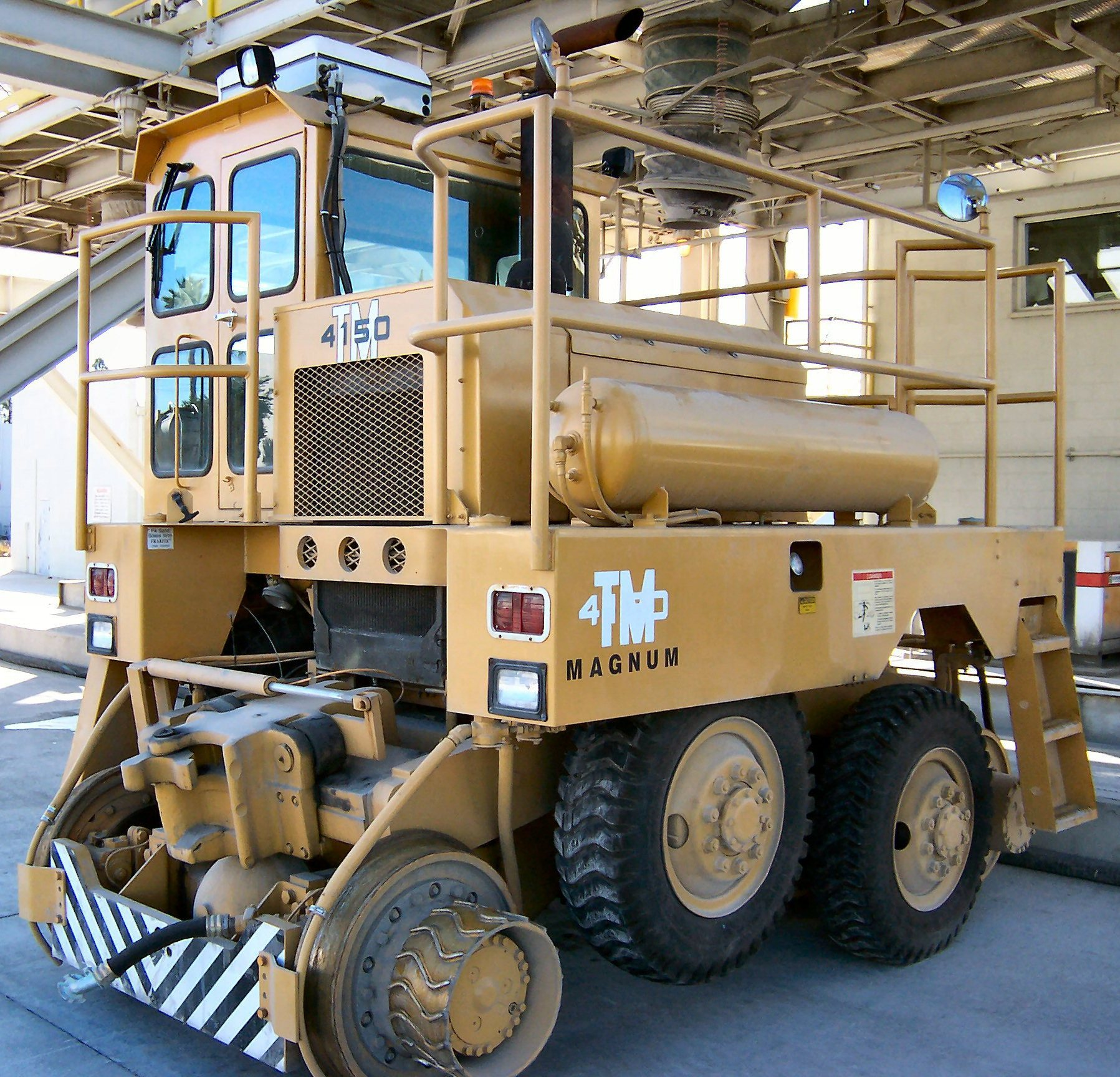
A Trackmobile 4150

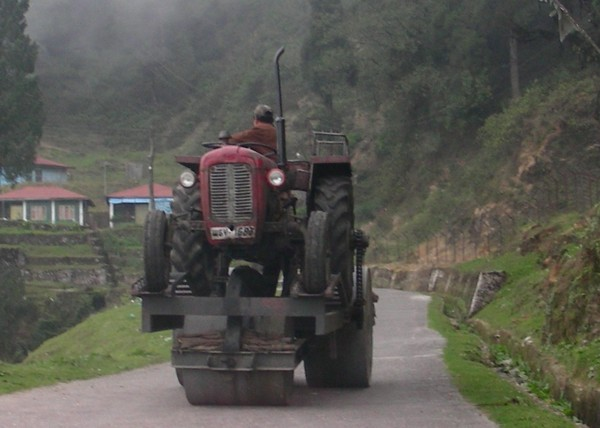
A tractor-driven road roller

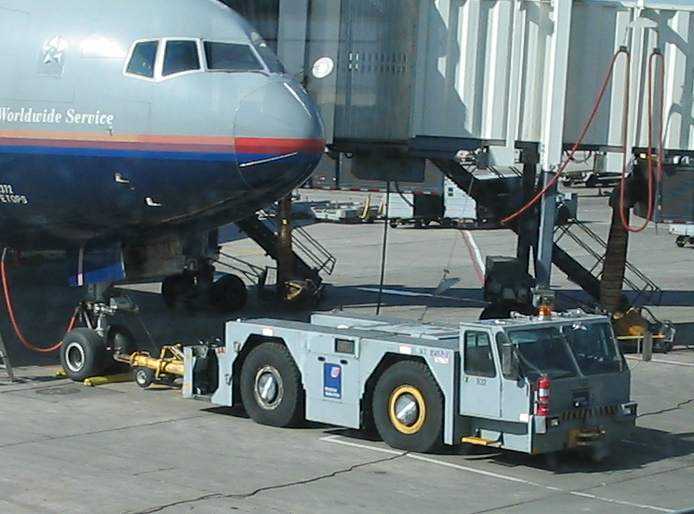
Aircraft pushback tractor

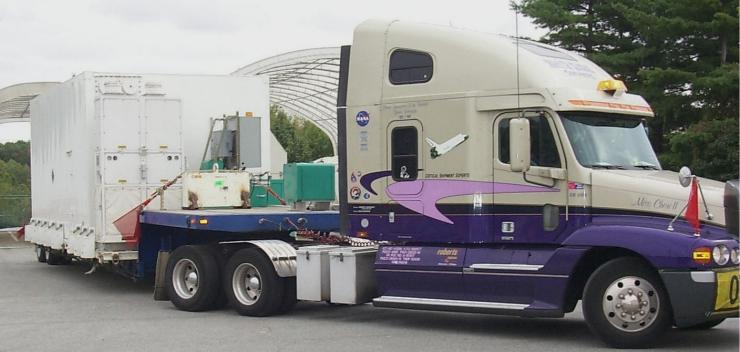
Road tractor pulling a flatbed trailer

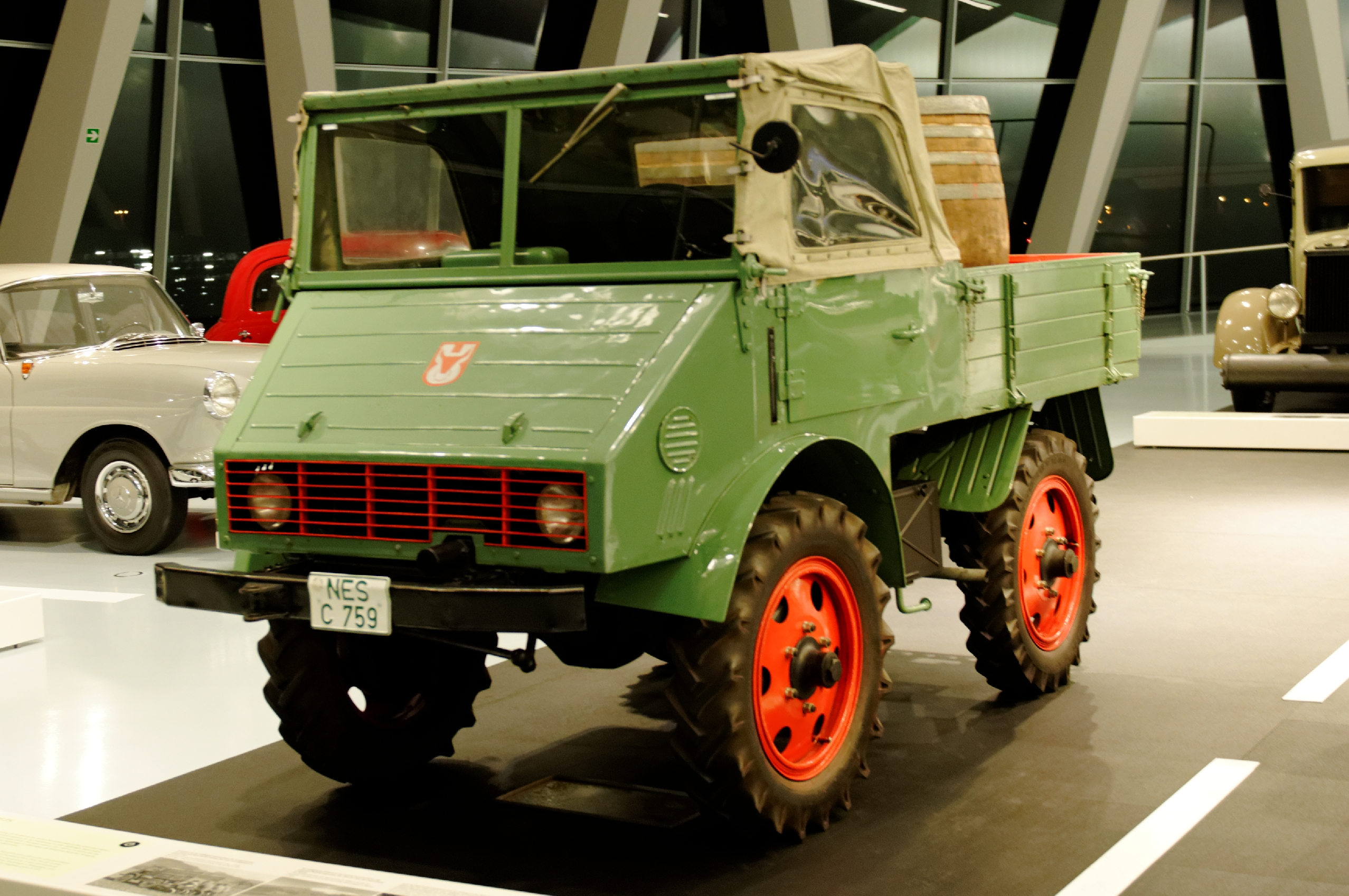
Unimog 70200

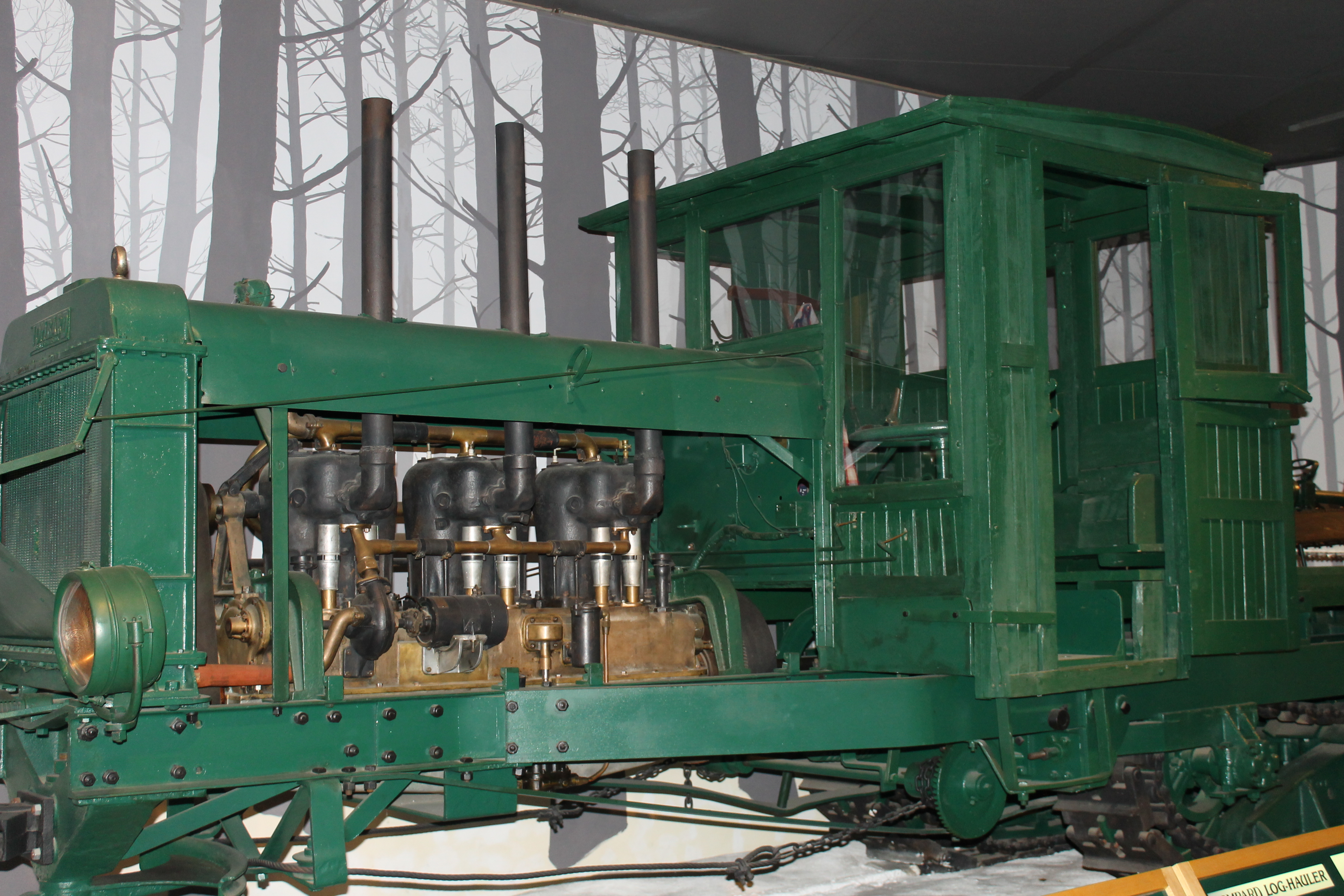
A Lombard steam log hauler

== Vintage tractors ==
There is considerable interest in owning and restoring vintage tractors. Books have been written on the topic, and as of 2025 a British retailer of magazines offers about 10 titles dedicated to tractors.

In the United Kingdom the National Vintage Tractor and Engine Club (NVTEC) was established in 1970 and has a network of regional groups. It offers assistance with the complexities of registering old tractors with the Driver and Vehicle Licensing Agency under the V765 system. NVTEC organised an early tractor run, with 150 vintage tractors, in 1986. In the United States, organizations include the Early Day Gas Engine and Tractor Association (EDGE&TA).

== Tractor runs ==
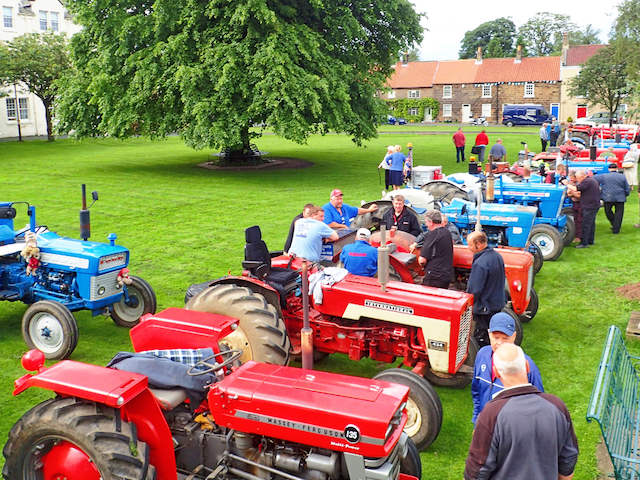
Tractors assembling in Great Ayton for the Three Coast charity tractor run in 2016

In the United Kingdom, a tractor trundle or tractor run is an event where a group of tractors are driven in procession along a predetermined route, usually as a fund-raising event for a charity. Funds are raised from drivers who pay a fee to participate, and from spectators along the route. Some tractor trundles take place near Christmas, after dark, with tractors decorated with festive lights.

The first recorded tractor run was the National Vintage Tractor Road Run held in 1986, when 150 vintage tractors raised funds for the British Heart Foundation. Notable events include the annual Pink Ladies Tractor Run, raising funds for breast cancer research since 2004, the Banbury Christmas Tractor Run which has featured Kaleb Cooper driving Jeremy Clarkson's Lamborghini tractor, and the Knaresborough tractor run which in 2025 included 423 vehicles, raising money for the Yorkshire Air Ambulance under the auspices of a dedicated community interest company.

== Nebraska tests ==
Nebraska tractor tests are tests mandated by the Nebraska Tractor Test Law and administered by the University of Nebraska, that objectively test the performance of all brands of tractors, 40 horsepower or more, sold in Nebraska. In the 1910s and 1920s, an era of snake oil sales and advertising tactics, the Nebraska tests helped farmers throughout North America to see through marketing claims and make informed buying decisions. The tests continue today, making sure tractors fulfill the manufacturer's advertised claims.

== Manufacturers ==
Some of the many tractor manufacturers and brands worldwide include:

- Belarus
- Case IH
- Caterpillar
- Claas
- Challenger
- Deutz-Fahr
- Fendt
- ITMCO
- Iseki
- JCB
- John Deere
- Lamborghini
- Landini
- Kubota
- Mahindra Tractors
- Massey Ferguson
- McCormick
- Mercedes-Benz
- New Holland
- SAME
- Steyr
- TAFE
- Ursus
- Valtra
- Zetor

In addition to commercial manufacturers, the Open Source Ecology group has developed several working prototypes of an open source hardware tractor called the LifeTrac as part of its Global Village Construction Set.

== Gallery ==
Agricultural tractors

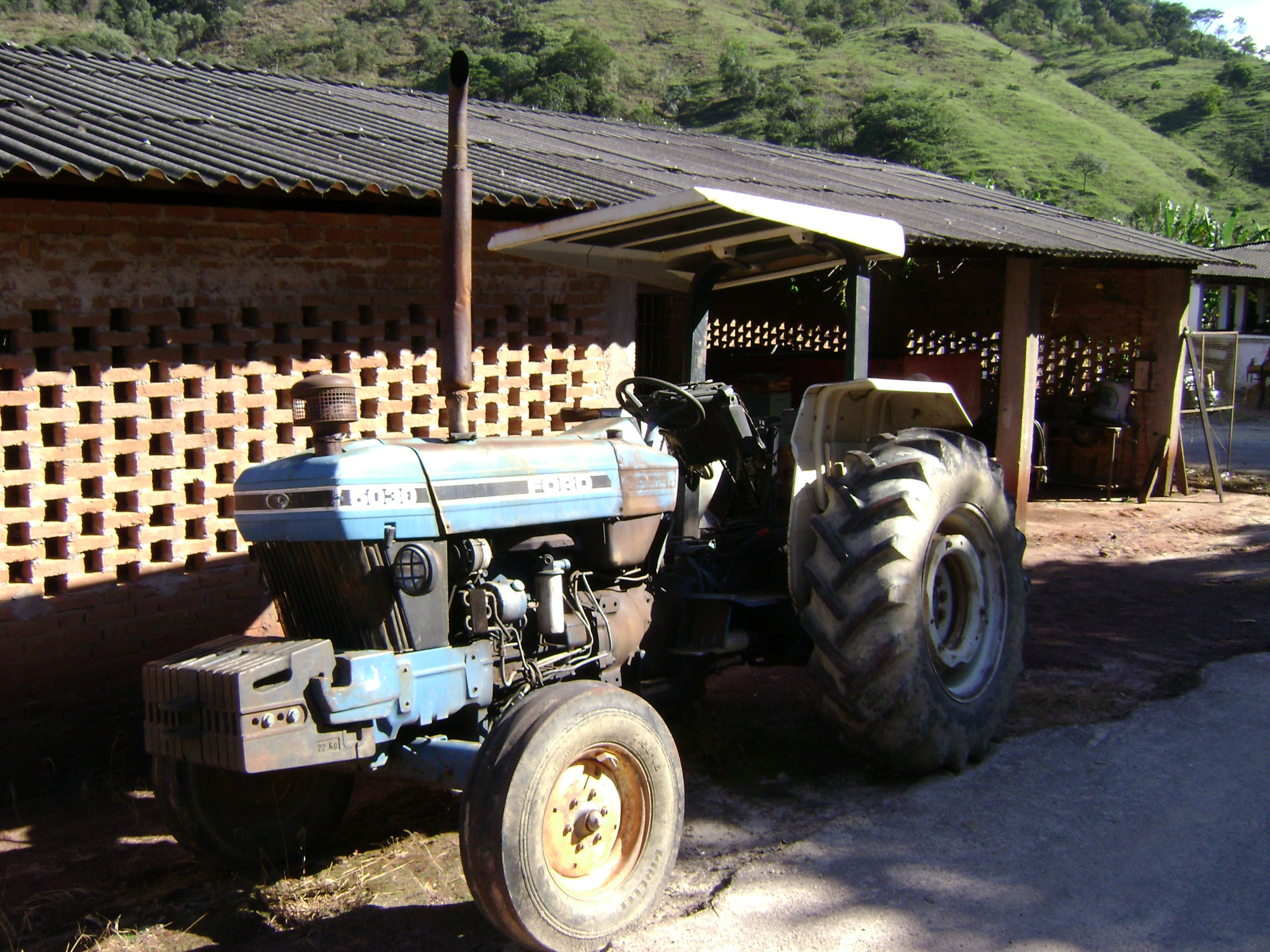
A Ford tractor in Brazil

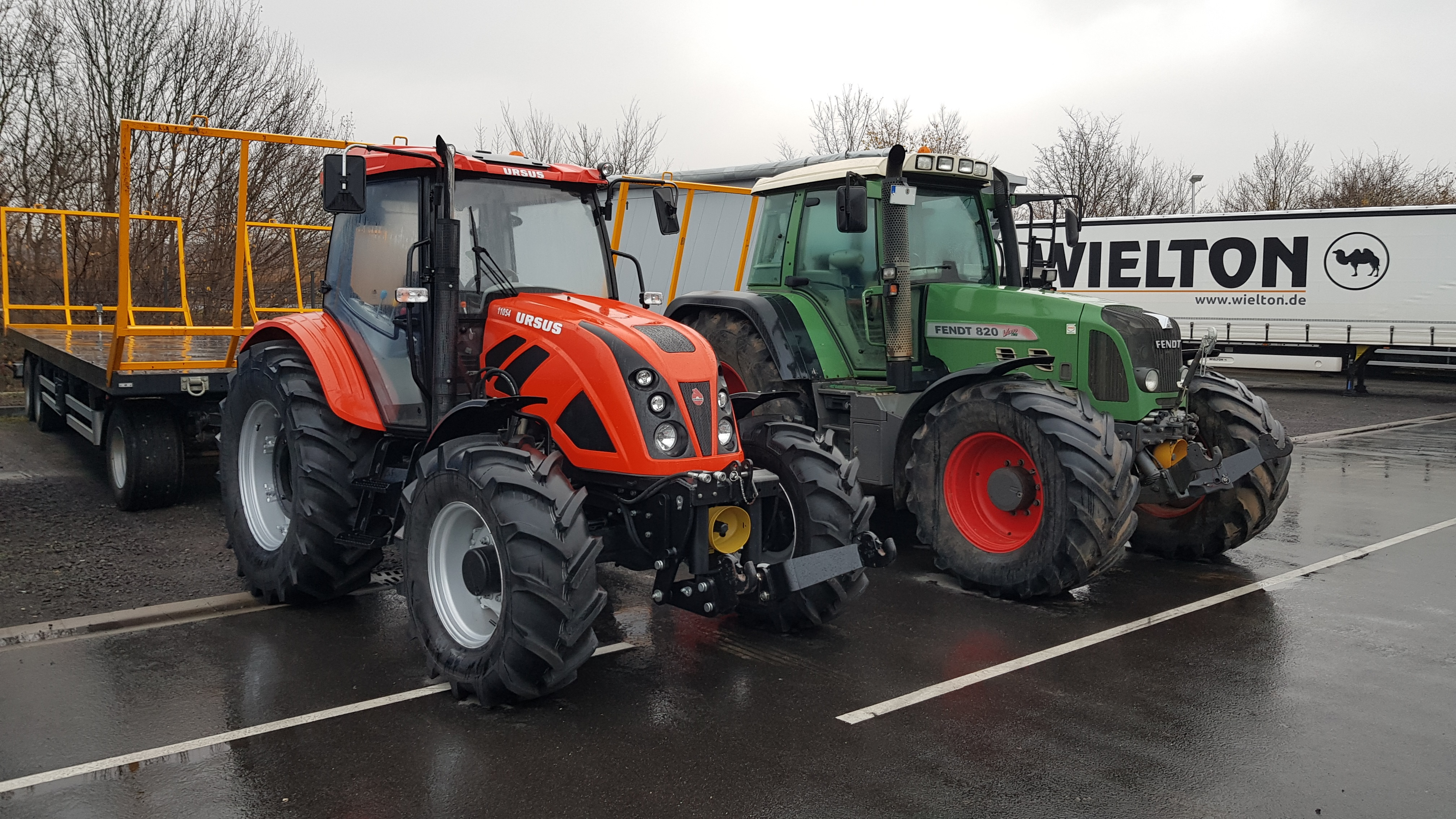
Modern tractors, an Ursus 11054 and Fendt 820

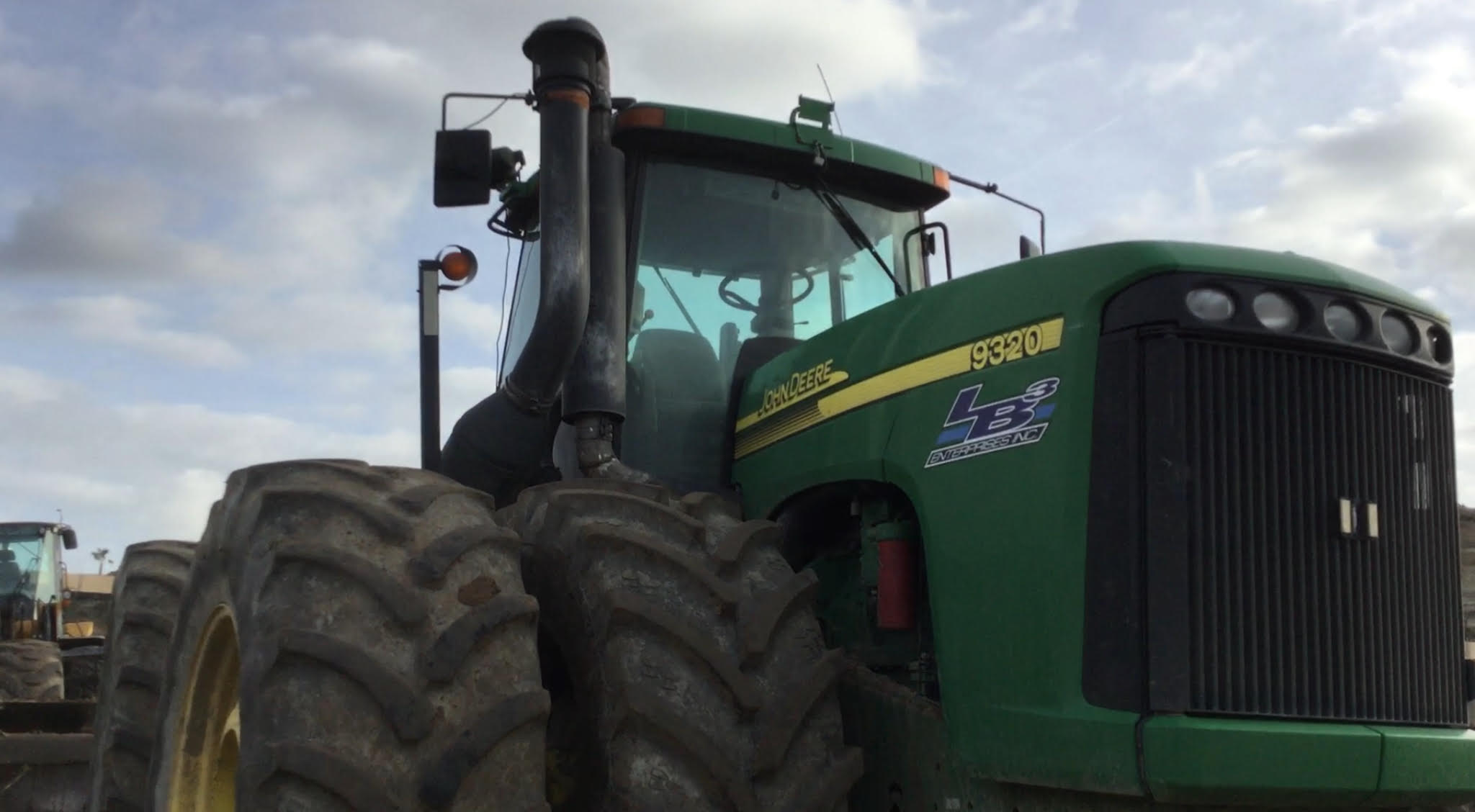
A John Deere 9320 at a construction site in the US

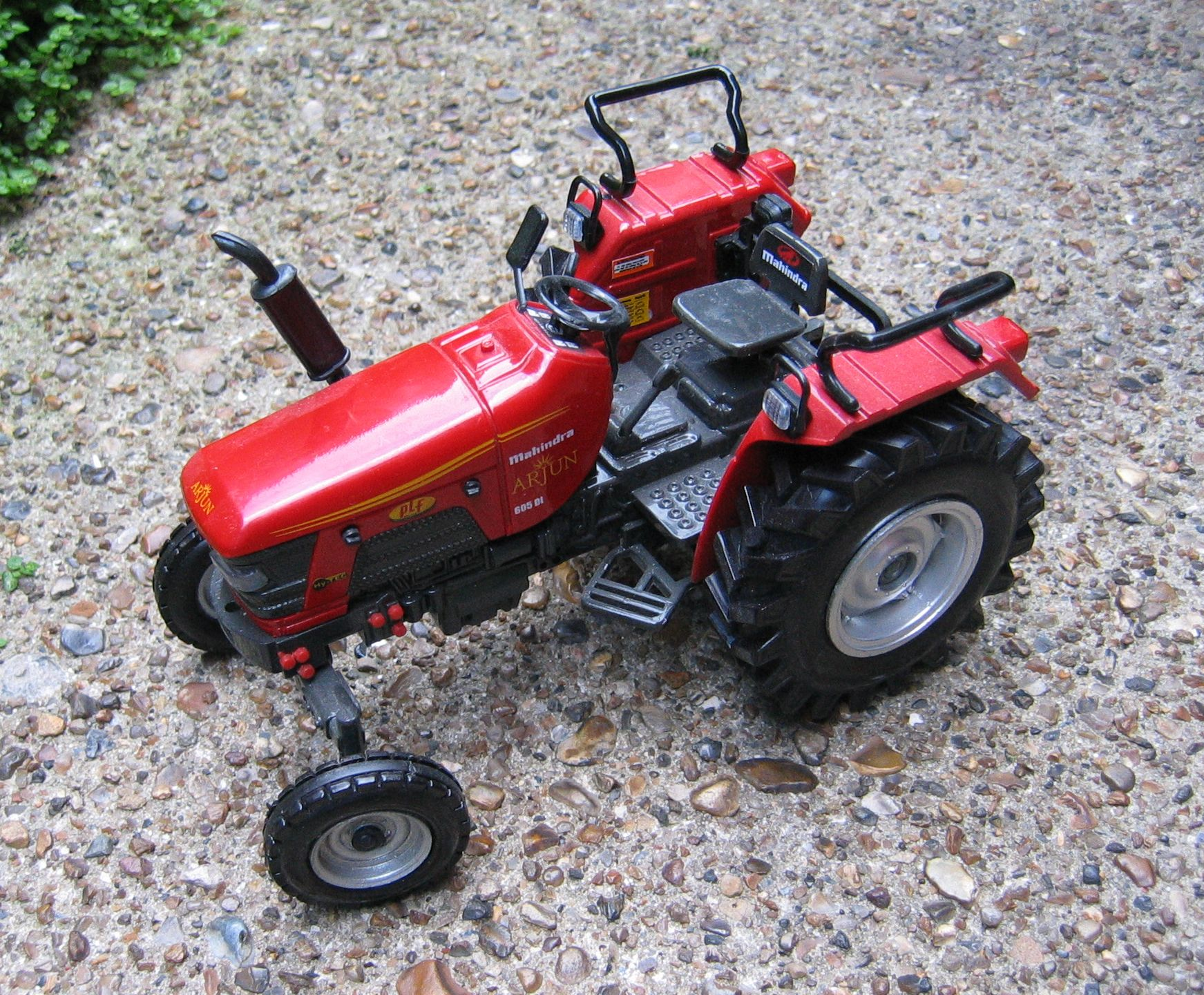
A scale model of a modern Ursus and Fendt tractor in Germany

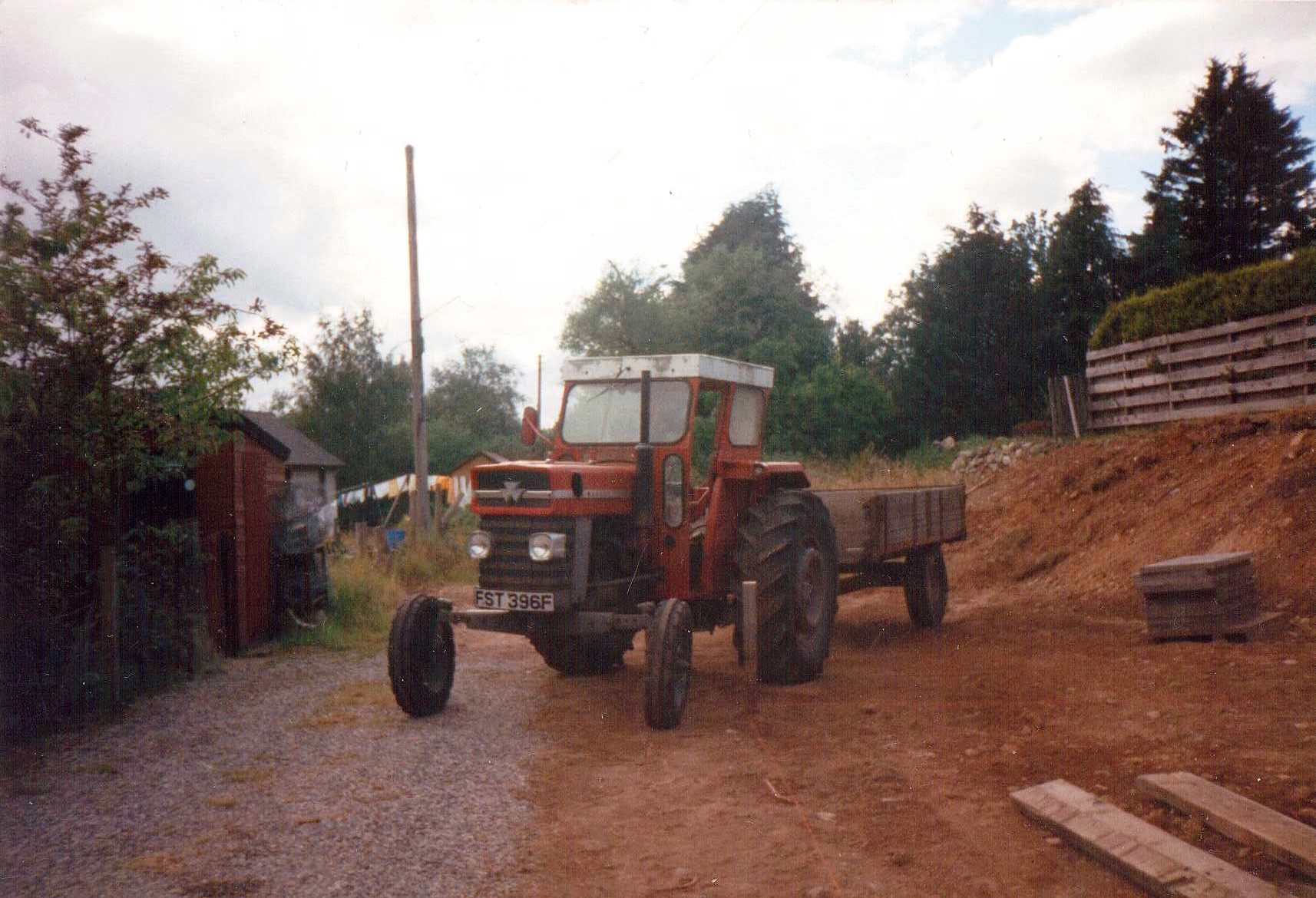
Farm tractor in Balnain, Scotland

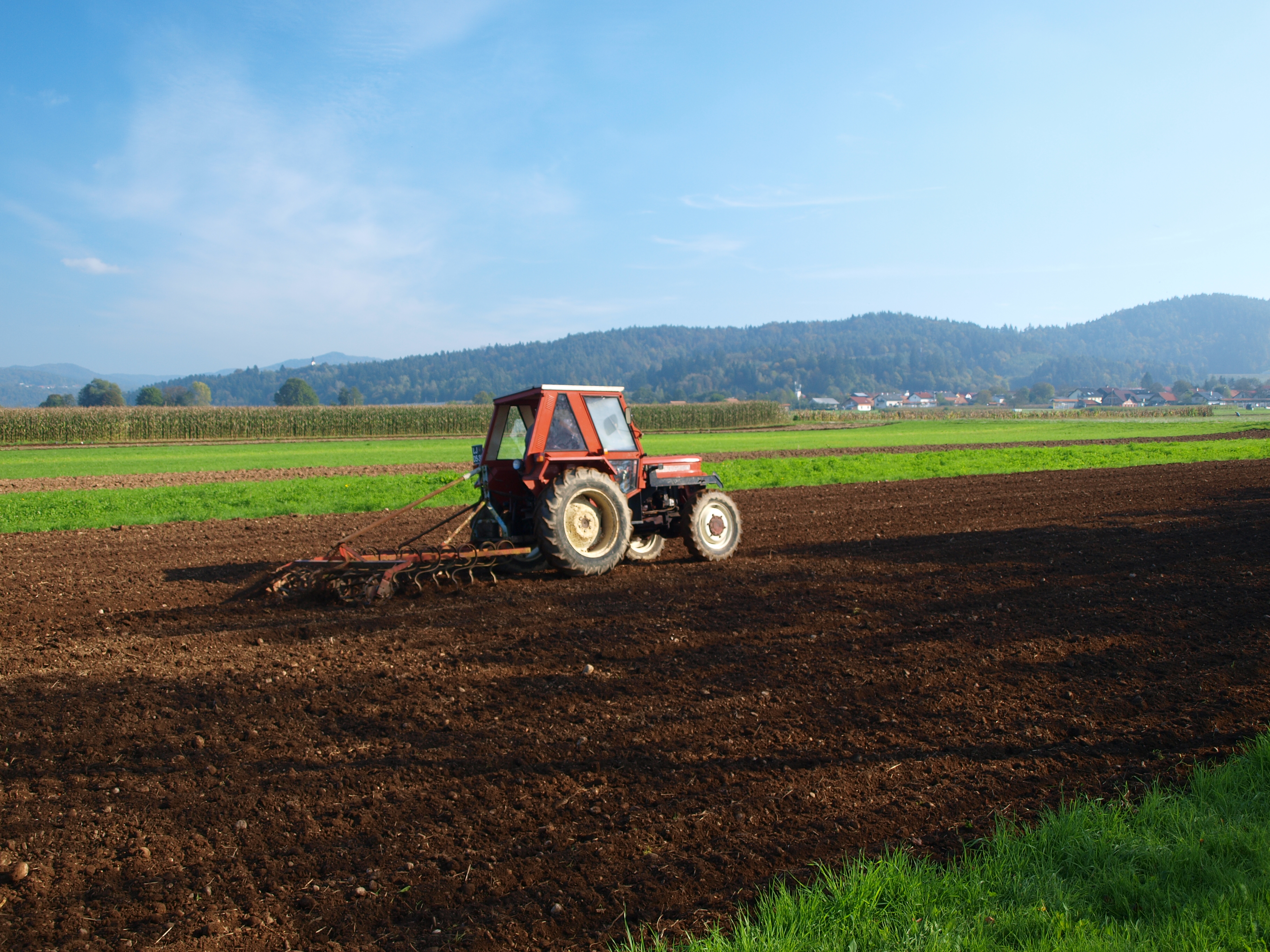
A tractor pulling a chisel plow in Slovenia

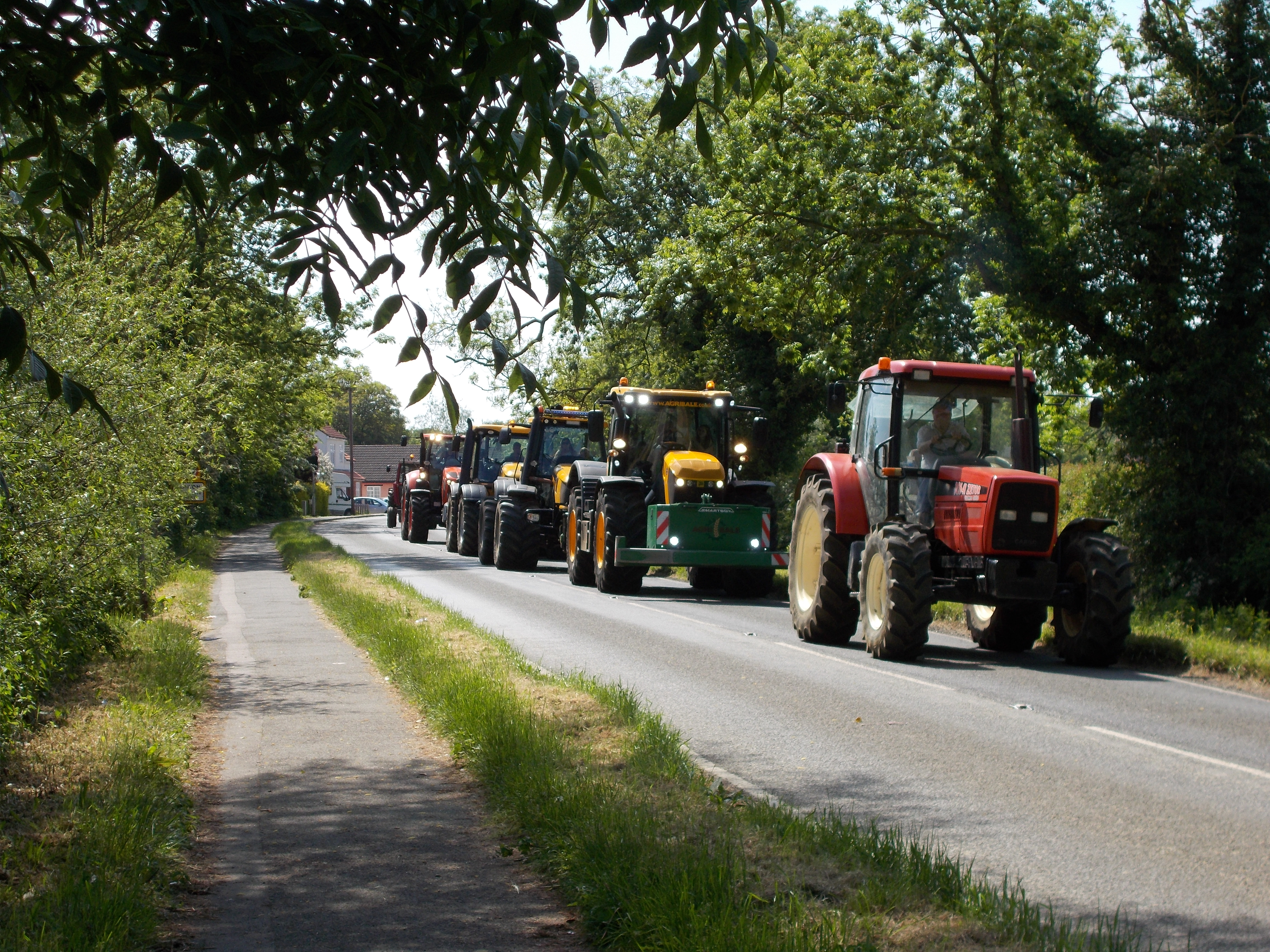
A charity fund-raising tractor run passes through Glinton, UK

== See also ==
- Agricultural machinery
- Artillery tractor
- Ballast tractor
- Big Bud 747, the world's largest farm tractor
- Driverless tractor
- Heavy equipment
- Lester F. Larsen Tractor Museum
- Non-road engine
- Power take-off
- Railcar mover
- Terminal tractor
- Tractor pulling
- Tractor unit
- Two-wheel tractor
- Unimog 70200
- DT-20
