= Need for Speed: Nitro =

2009 video game

- North American artwork featuring Lamborghini Reventón and Dodge Charger (1966) racing while the Police Shelby Mustang is pursuing
- Developers: Firebrand Games (DS); EA Montreal (Wii)
- Publisher: Electronic Arts
- Series: Need for Speed
- Platforms: Nintendo DS; Wii
- Release: NA: November 3, 2009; AU: November 5, 2009 (DS); EU: November 6, 2009; AU: November 26, 2009 (Wii)
- Genre: Racing
- Modes: Single-player; multiplayer

Need for Speed: Nitro is a 2009 racing video game and the fourteenth title in the Need for Speed series. It was published by Electronic Arts for the Nintendo Wii and DS platforms. The Wii version was developed by EA Montreal, who have previous experience with Nintendo consoles, while the DS version was developed separately by Firebrand Games' Florida studio.

Nitro is the only game in the series to be released exclusively for Nintendo platforms, and one of only two games in the franchise to date (the other being the mobile No Limits) to not be released for PCs. It was one of three games announced in January, including Need for Speed: Shift and 2010's Need for Speed: World.

An enhanced edition of the DS version, Need for Speed: Nitro-X, was released for DSiWare on November 26, 2010.

== Gameplay ==
Need for Speed: Nitro is an arcade style racing game that emphasizes speed and excitement over realism and vehicle tuning. The Wii version allows up to four players to race, with a maximum of eight racers at once. The Wii version lets up to four racers compete in drag races, too.

Need for Speed: Nitro features disproportionate real-life vehicles.

=== Modes ===
Events feature different modes, namely circuits, elimination races, drift challenges, speed trap challenges, drag races, and time attack challenges. Career mode allows players to compete in several cups and build up a roster of vehicles, while Arcade Mode lets players immediately jump into a race with customized difficulty and race conditions. During races, police will attempt to block and ram racers, causing damage that will reduce the players' top speed and amount of nitro available. Police are not in drag races. The game features power-up icons in the race that immediately repair vehicle damage or increase your opponents' police heat level. During a race, players are awarded "style points" based on performing powerslides and drafting, and nitro is recharged over time. There is small nitro and powerful nitro similar to the Wii version of Need for Speed: Hot Pursuit.

=== Own It ===
The game has an aesthetic feature called "Own It"; while a player is in the lead, the surrounding landscape and buildings are textured with their car's colors, graffiti, and tags, all of which can be created with the game's new car customization system. Lines on the road will also have the color of the car colors. The "Own it" feature is a convenient way to indicate the race leader, and players get additional style points for staying in first place.

=== Tracks ===
The five cities that in which are in the game are Rio de Janeiro, Brazil, Cairo, Egypt Madrid, Spain, Singapore, and Dubai, UAE (and San Diego in the DS version). Each city has two full race circuits, one track for drag racing, and the game takes certain parts of a circuit for time trial, speed trap, and drift events. The two circuits in Dubai are the Palm Jumeirah (artificial islands) and the Dubai Marina. The tracks for drag racing are almost in straight lines. In Dubai, the Burj Khalifa, the Burj Al Arab, and the Jumeirah Beach Hotel are seen in the video game while racing. In Singapore, races take place during sunset. In all the other cities, races take place during the day. In Rio de Janeiro, Christ the Redeemer can be seen.

=== Characters ===
There are 35 opponents with names in the Wii version of the game, although five of them are "leaders", one for each city, and receive cinematic treatment in the form of a quick intro full motion video when the player first accesses a city in each cup.

- The street racing leader of Rio de Janeiro is Thiago. He drives a Volkswagen Type 2, 1969 Dodge Charger R/T and a 2009 Dodge Challenger SRT8.
- The street racing leader of Cairo, Egypt is Omar. He drives a 1965 Volkswagen Beetle, a Porsche Cayenne Turbo S and a Lamborghini Gallardo.
- The street racing leader of Madrid is Luis. He drives a Hummer H2 SUT, 1967 Ford Shelby GT500 and an Audi R8.
- The street racing leader of Singapore is Zarinah. She drives a Toyota Corolla GT-S, Nissan 370Z and a Ford GT.
- Jawad, the leader of street racing in Dubai, is the most competitive and the hardest to beat. He drives a black Tesla Roadster, Porsche 718 Cayman S and the Lamborghini Reventón.

In Rio de Janeiro, racers use muscle cars such as the Dodge Challenger and Chevrolet Camaro. In Singapore and Dubai, exotics such as the Audi R8 and Lamborghini Gallardo are used by racers. In Dubai, there is even Lamborghini Gallardo traffic.

All the leaders' cars have unique livery and can be unlocked, except for Thiago's Challenger SRT8 and Omar's Lamborghini Gallardo. Instead of the Challenger and the Gallardo, alternative versions of them having different unique livery are unlocked by the player.

=== Controls ===
Both versions of the game support multiple control schemes. The Wii version supports five control schemes across four Wii peripheral configurations - the Wii Remote, the Wii Remote and Nunchuk, the Classic Controller and the Nintendo GameCube controller. Two of the five control schemes involve using just the Wii Remote, in which one uses it as a steering wheel and the other holds it in one hand and twists it to steer, similar to Mini Desktop Racing. The Nintendo DS version has two control schemes, one that assigns pedals to the shoulder buttons, and another that assigns pedals to face buttons.

== Soundtrack ==
There are 26 songs in the Wii version's soundtrack. Some performing artists in the soundtrack include k-os, Dizzee Rascal, Danko Jones, LMFAO, Lady Sovereign, and the Crystal Method. The soundtrack covers many genres, especially EDM, rock, and rap. Also, Nitro has a similar soundtrack to FIFA 10, which was developed by EA at around the same time.

== Development and marketing ==
In the new franchising model for the series adopted by EA, Nitro takes its place aiming at casual gamers rather than the hardcore fans of the series and is also Nintendo exclusive. As with previous titles in the Need for Speed series, Nitro features a large catalog of customizable licensed vehicles, as well as cops. It is distinguished by fast, arcade racing with a cartoon/anime-like visual, akin to Blur. Need for Speed: Nitro is also the first Need for Speed game that has traffic cars that can also be bought in career mode (with the exception of the Volkswagen Golf traffic car).

A trailer was released on the Need for Speed website depicting four cartoon-like vehicles that are actually disproportionate real-life vehicles. The cars were a 1969 Dodge Charger R/T, a Nissan Skyline, an Audi R8, and a Lamborghini Reventón. The trailer also displayed the buildings in different vibrant colors and several disproportionate police vehicles, such as the Shelby GT500.

== Need for Speed: Nitro-X ==
An updated version of the game, titled Need for Speed: Nitro-X, was released exclusively as a downloadable DSiware title for Nintendo DSi handhelds on November 15, 2010 in North America and November 26 in Europe. It featured six new cars, 16 tracks updated from the original release, and a new game mode called "Super Pursuit" that puts the player in the role of the police.

== Reception ==
Reception

Aggregate score
Aggregator	Score
Metacritic	(NDS) 70/100 (Wii) 69/100

Review scores
Publication	Score
1Up.com	B−
Eurogamer	5/10
GameSpot	7/10
GameTrailers	7.2/10
IGN	8.0/10

Need for Speed: Nitro received mixed reviews from critics. Mark Bozon from IGN stated that "Nitro is a blast despite its faults". Although 1Up.com enjoyed the title, they criticised the game for its shallow campaign, awarding the game a B−. Eurogamer was considerably less impressed, awarding the game a score of 5 out of 10, stating that "[although] it might scream 'excitement' at the top of its tiny lungs...Need For Speed: Nitro's initially endearing zest quickly degenerates into repetitive strain." Despite this, Eurogamer praised the innovative use of the changing level appearance depending on the player's car.

Official Nintendo Magazine gave a more positive review, rating it 80% and saying; "Need for Speed: Nitro doesn't do anything remarkable. It's simply fun to play, and in focusing on quality over quantity EA has managed to put together one of the best racing games on the Wii."
