= Mini Desktop Racing =

2005 video game

- Developer(s): Data Design Interactive
- Publisher(s): PAL Regions; Metro3D Europe (PS2); Data Design Interactive (Wii); North America; Conspiracy Entertainment
- Platform(s): PlayStation 2 Wii; Windows
- Release: 20 July 2005: Windows; EU: 20 July 2005 PlayStation 2; EU: 27 July 2005 Wii; AU: 25 October 2007; EU: 23 November 2007; NA: 4 December 2007
- Genre(s): Racing

Mini Desktop Racing is a racing video game published by Metro 3D and developed by Data Design Interactive. It was released on PC and PlayStation 2 formats in July 2005. A Wii version was released in Australia on 22 November 2007, and 23 November 2007 in Europe and North America.

== Gameplay ==
Much like the popular Micro Machines, Mini Desktop Racing is displayed with a top-down view. Players race in a variety of mini cars around a variety of desktop areas. The game offers reasonably interactive courses by allowing players to "turn on fans" and "spill drinks" in attempts to hinder opponents. Every level has a variety of different things that can be interacted with. The game can be played in single-player mode, in which you can race against one or more computer-controlled opponents or in multiplayer where you can race against one other friend.

The Wii version of the game is controlled with the Wii Remote pointed forward, which the player holds in one hand and twists left or right to steer, similar to drag races in the Wii version of Need for Speed: Pro Street, as well as the one-handed control scheme for the Wii version of Need for Speed: Nitro.

== Reception and publicity ==
In 2005, Mini Desktop Racing had very poor advertising, making it a relatively unknown game. Reviews are difficult to come by, though most critics gave the game low scores, criticizing primarily its poor presentation. Most internet gaming sites, such as IGN or GameSpot, feature the game in their databases. Mark Bozon of IGN gave the Wii version of the game a 1.2, criticizing the game's reuse of Offroad Extreme's engine, poor graphics and unwieldy controls.
