= Lamborghini Reventón =

Sports car

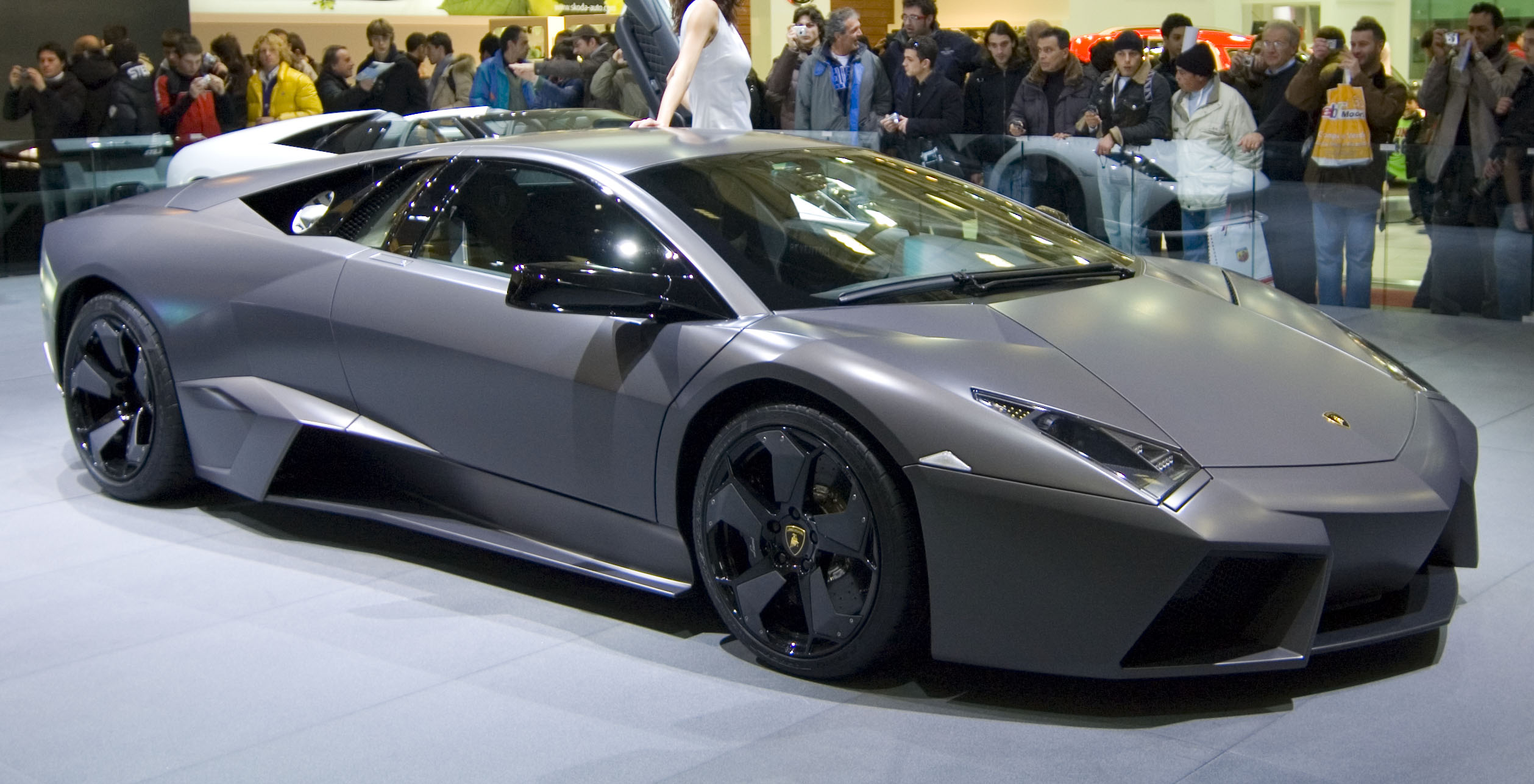
- Lamborghini Reventón at the 2007 Frankfurt Motor Show

Overview
- Manufacturer: Lamborghini
- Production: 2007–2009; 21 coupés ("00/20" for museum), 15 roadsters
- Assembly: Italy: Sant'Agata Bolognese
- Designer: Filippo Perini

Body and chassis
- Class: Sports car (S)
- Body style: 2-door coupé 2-door roadster
- Layout: Mid-engine, all wheel drive
- Doors: Scissor
- Related: Lamborghini Murciélago

Powertrain
- Engine: 6.5 L Lamborghini V12
- Transmission: 6-speed e-gear automated manual

Dimensions
- Wheelbase: 2,665 mm (104.9 in)
- Length: 4,700 mm (185.0 in)
- Width: 2,058 mm (81.0 in)
- Height: 1,135 mm (44.7 in)
- Curb weight: 1,665 kg (3,671 lb) (coupé); 1,690 kg (3,726 lb) (roadster)

The Lamborghini Reventón (Spanish pronunciation: [reβenˈton]) is a mid-engine limited production sports car that debuted at the 2007 Frankfurt Motor Show. The official press release stated that only 20 vehicles would be sold to the public, with one additional car (marked as 00/20) produced for the Lamborghini museum. Each car is stamped with its number in the sequence of 20 between the driver and passenger seats.

While the exterior is new, almost all the mechanical elements, including the engine, are sourced directly from the Murciélago LP 640. According to the official press release, the Reventón's exterior styling was inspired by "the fastest airplanes".

== Name ==
The car is named after a fighting bull, in line with Lamborghini tradition. The bull, raised by Don Heriberto Rodriguez, was best known for killing famed Mexican bullfighter Felix Guzman in 1943. Reventón means "small explosion" or "burst" in Spanish, when used as a noun. In automotive terms, it means "blowout or flat tire" when used as a noun. When it was used as the name of a bull, however, it was intended to be interpreted as an adjective, a quality or property of that bull in particular. In this last sense, reventón means "he who seems to be about to burst". Or, in the case of a flower (a carnation, un clavel reventón) in its maximum point, of luxuriance or a mouth (una boca reventona), for its beauty and fullness.

== Overview ==
=== Interior ===
The instrument panel in the Reventón consists of three TFT liquid crystal displays (LCDs) with two different display modes. The instruments are housed in a structure milled from a solid aluminium block, protected by a carbon-fiber casing. The car's instrumentation includes a "g-force-meter" which displays the magnitude and direction of the g-forces acting upon the car. The seats of the Reventón are made from black leather and brown Alcantara.

=== Exterior ===
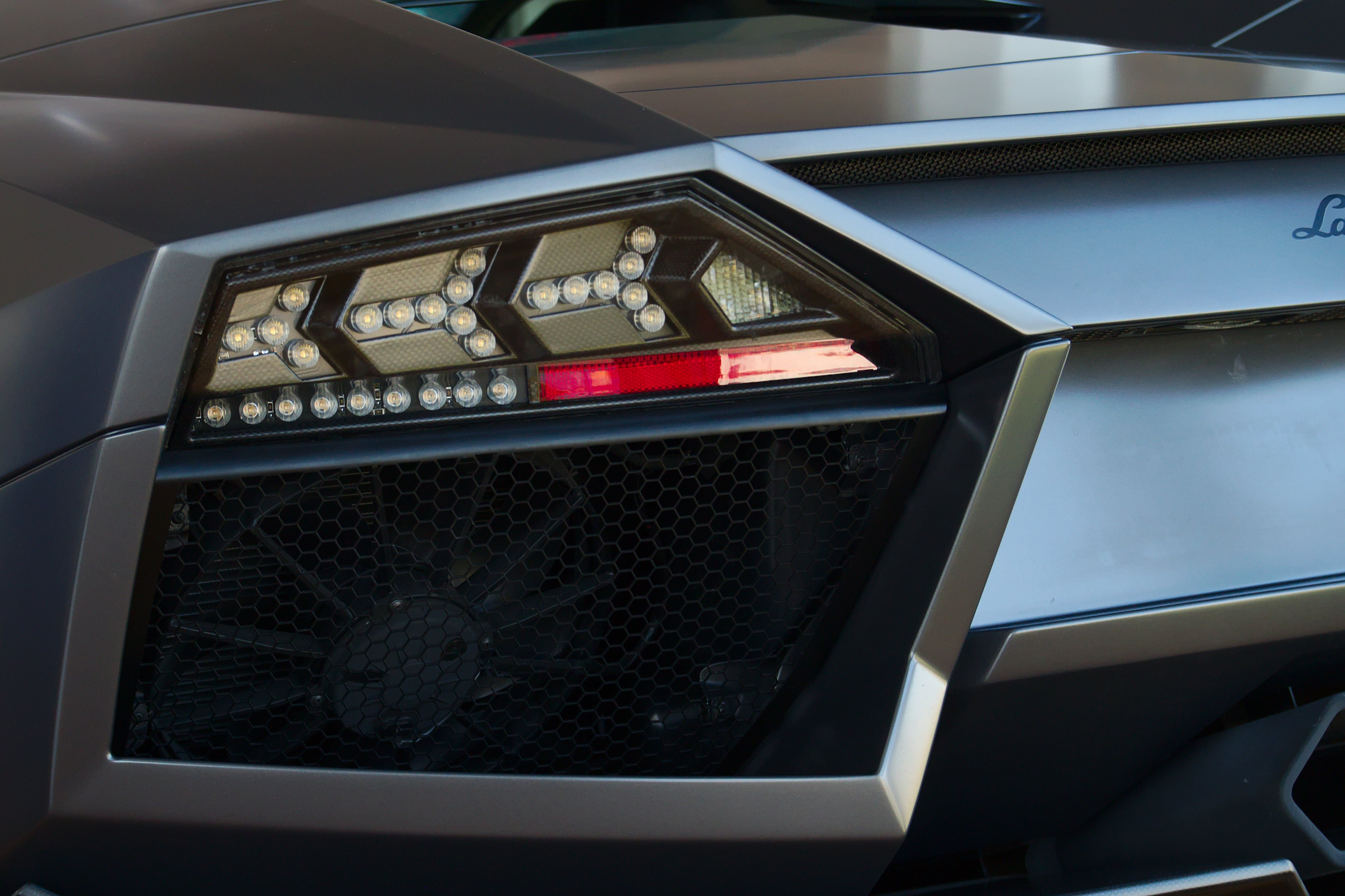
The rear lights of the Reventón. The Lamborghini Aventador also drew inspiration from the design.

The Reventón features an all-new carbon-fiber exterior. All cars have the same exterior color, described as "mid opaque grey without the usual shine."

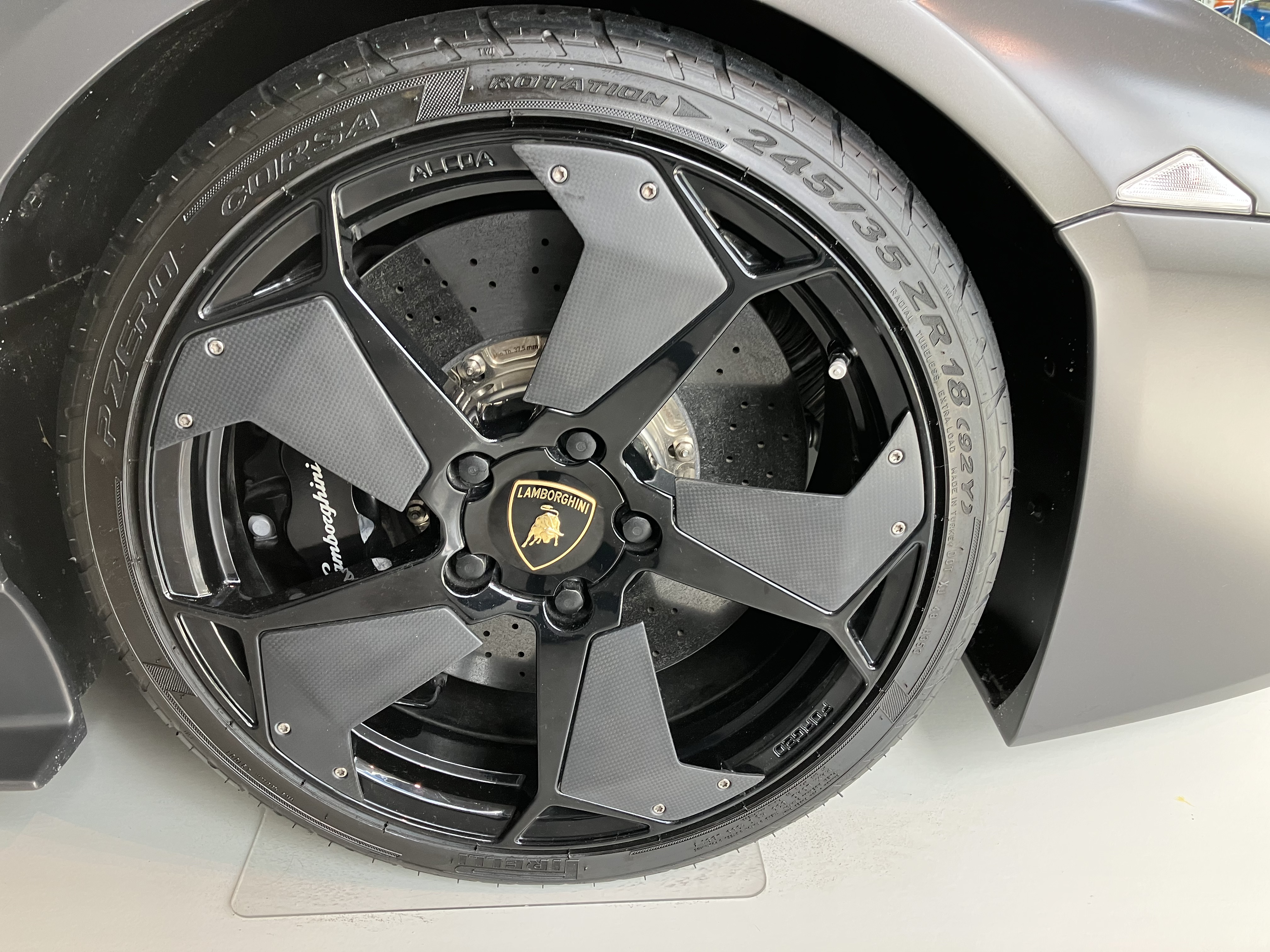
The Reventón's forged wheels with carbon blades and Pirelli P Zero Corsa 245/35 ZR 18 tyres

It is the first Lamborghini automobile to incorporate daytime running lamps into the headlamps. Seven light-emitting diodes (LED) at each headlamp flank the bi-xenon main beam and stay lit whenever the car is in motion. Due to the high temperatures in the rear lower part of the car, special heatproof LEDs are used for the indicator and hazard lights, stoplights, and rear lights with a triple arrow optical effect. The Reventon's exterior design formed the basis for the company's subsequent flagship, the Aventador. The active rear wing and the active air intakes integrated into the car's shoulders are electronically controlled, deploying automatically only at high speeds in an effort to maximize both aerodynamic and cooling efficiency.

=== Performance ===
The engine is the same unit used in the Murciélago LP 640, a 6,496 cc (6.5 L; 396.4 cu in) V12, now upgraded to 650 PS (641 hp; 478 kW) at 8,000 rpm and 660 N⋅m (487 lb⋅ft) of torque at 6,000 rpm. The car accelerates from 0–100 km/h (62 mph) in 3.4 seconds and can attain a maximum speed of over 340 km/h (211 mph).

== Sales ==
Of the original 20 coupes, 10 were delivered to the United States, seven to Europe, one to Canada, and two to Asia. One of them is in the possession of the Head of Chechen Republic, Ramzan Kadyrov.

== Reventón Roadster ==
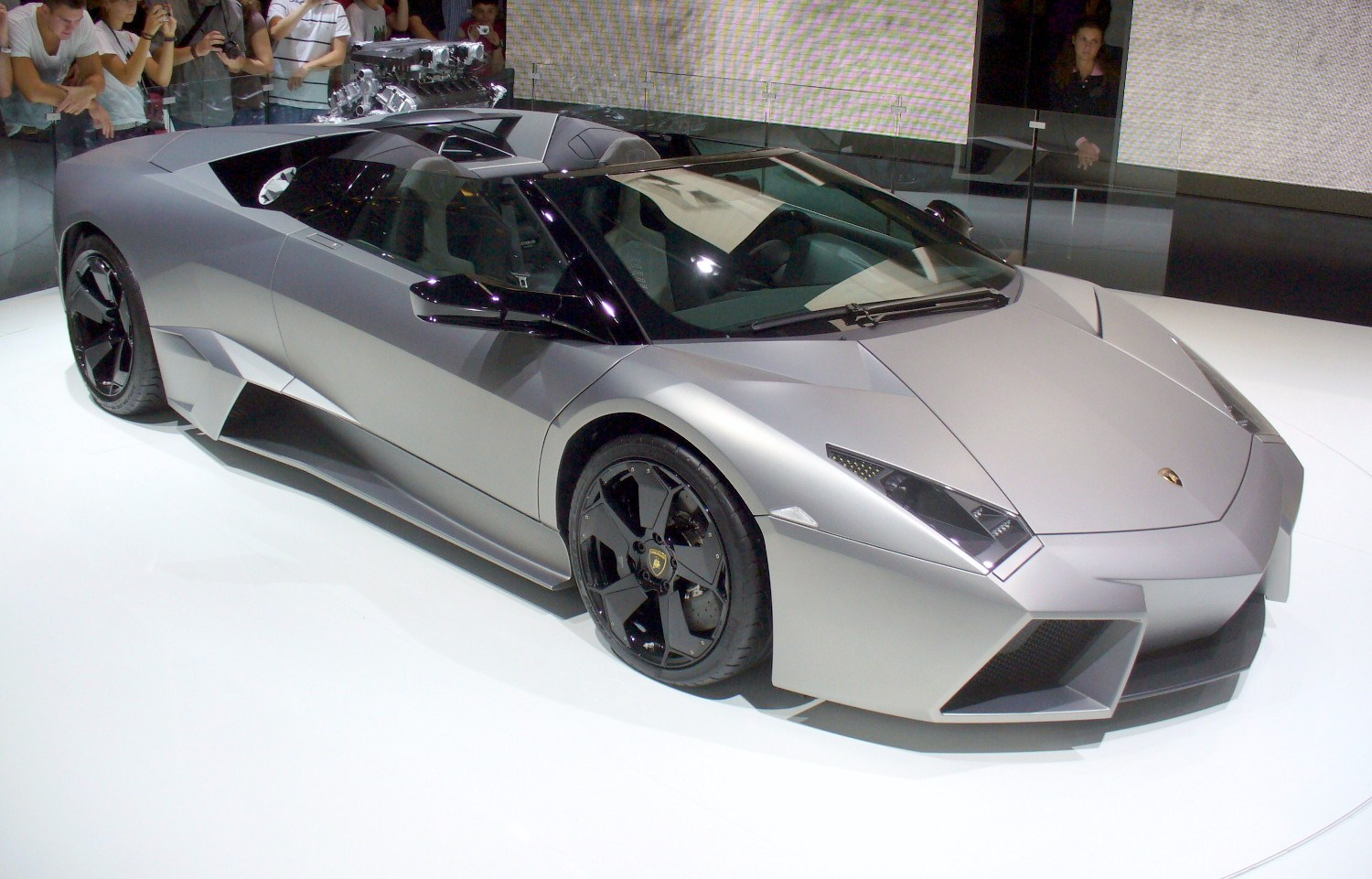
The Reventón Roadster

A roadster variant of the Reventón was unveiled at the 2009 Frankfurt Motor Show. The roadster uses the engine used in the Murciélago LP 670–4 Super Veloce. In June 2009, Autocar published a report saying that potential buyers have been shown the car, although a Lamborghini spokesman told the publication that reports of the car were "just speculation". Production was set for a run of 15 units, with a MSRP of €1,100,000. The actual price, however, increased twofold to around US$2,100,000, due to high demand. The Reventón Roadster has more power than its coupe counterpart, at 670 PS (661 hp; 493 kW) at 8,000 rpm, but the same level of torque and a slightly lower top speed of 205 mph (330 km/h). 0–100 km/h (62 mph) acceleration reportedly remains the same at 3.4 seconds. Lamborghini says the chassis reinforcing components to compensate for the loss of the roof add 25 kg (55 lb) to the weight of the car. The car also features deployable roll hoops which quickly extend to protect the car's occupants in the event of a rollover.
