= Dodge Charger (1966) =

American specialty car model by Dodge

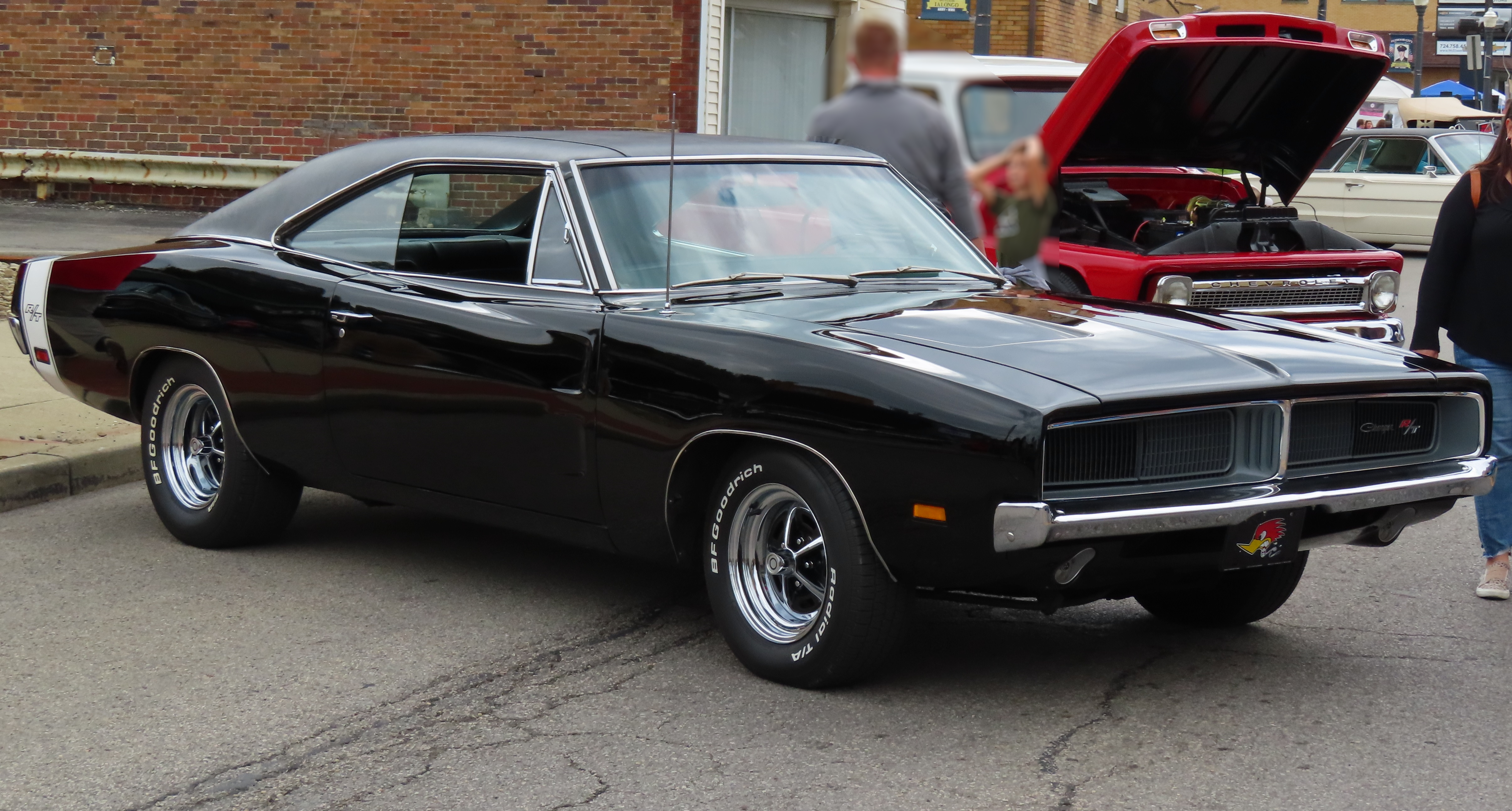
- 1969 Dodge Charger R/T

Overview
- Manufacturer: Dodge (Chrysler)
- Production: 1966–1978

Body and chassis
- Class: Mid-size; Muscle car
- Layout: FR layout
- Platform: B-body

Chronology
- Successor: Dodge Magnum

The Dodge Charger is a mid-size automobile that was produced by Dodge from 1966 through 1978 model years, and was based on the Chrysler B platform.

== Origin ==
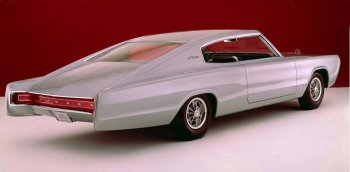
1965 Dodge Charger II Show Car

During the early 1960s, automakers were exploring new ideas in the personal luxury and specialty car segments. Chrysler, slow to enter the specialty car market, selected their Dodge Division to enter the marketplace with a mid-size B-bodied sporty car to fit between the "pony car" Ford Mustang and "personal luxury" Ford Thunderbird. The intention was to create a fastback look while sharing as much existing company hardware as possible using lessons learned from the luxury coupe Chrysler 300.

The Coronet-based Charger that resulted was introduced in mid-season of the 1966 model year in response to the Rambler Marlin, Ford Mustang, and Plymouth Barracuda. The styling was generally a departure from the Dodge's mainstream cars. The 1965 Marlin, along with the Charger that arrived during the 1966 model year, were two cars which set a new standard for radical fastback design in American mid-size automobiles. According to Richard M. Langworth, "because it was an intermediate like the Rambler Marlin, the Charger could have been an aesthetic disaster, but long side windows prevented its sweeping roof from looking too heavy."

Burt Bouwkamp, Chief Engineer for Dodge during the 1960s and one of the men behind the Charger, related his experience during a speech in July 2004.

Lynn Townsend was at odds with the Dodge Dealers and wanted to do something to please them. So in 1965 he asked me to come to his office – for the second time. He noted that one of the Dodge Dealer Council requests was for a Barracuda type vehicle. The overall dealer product recommendation theme was the same – we want what Plymouth has. The specific request for a Mustang type vehicle was not as controversial to Lynn. His direction to me was to give them a specialty car but he said 'for God's sake don't make it a derivative of the Barracuda': i.e. don't make it a Barracuda competitor.

So the 1966 Charger was born.

"We built a Charger 'idea' car which we displayed at auto shows in 1965 to stimulate market interest in the concept. It was the approved design but we told the press and auto show attendees that it was just an "idea" and that we would build it if they liked it. It was pre-ordained that they would like it."

== First generation ==
First generation
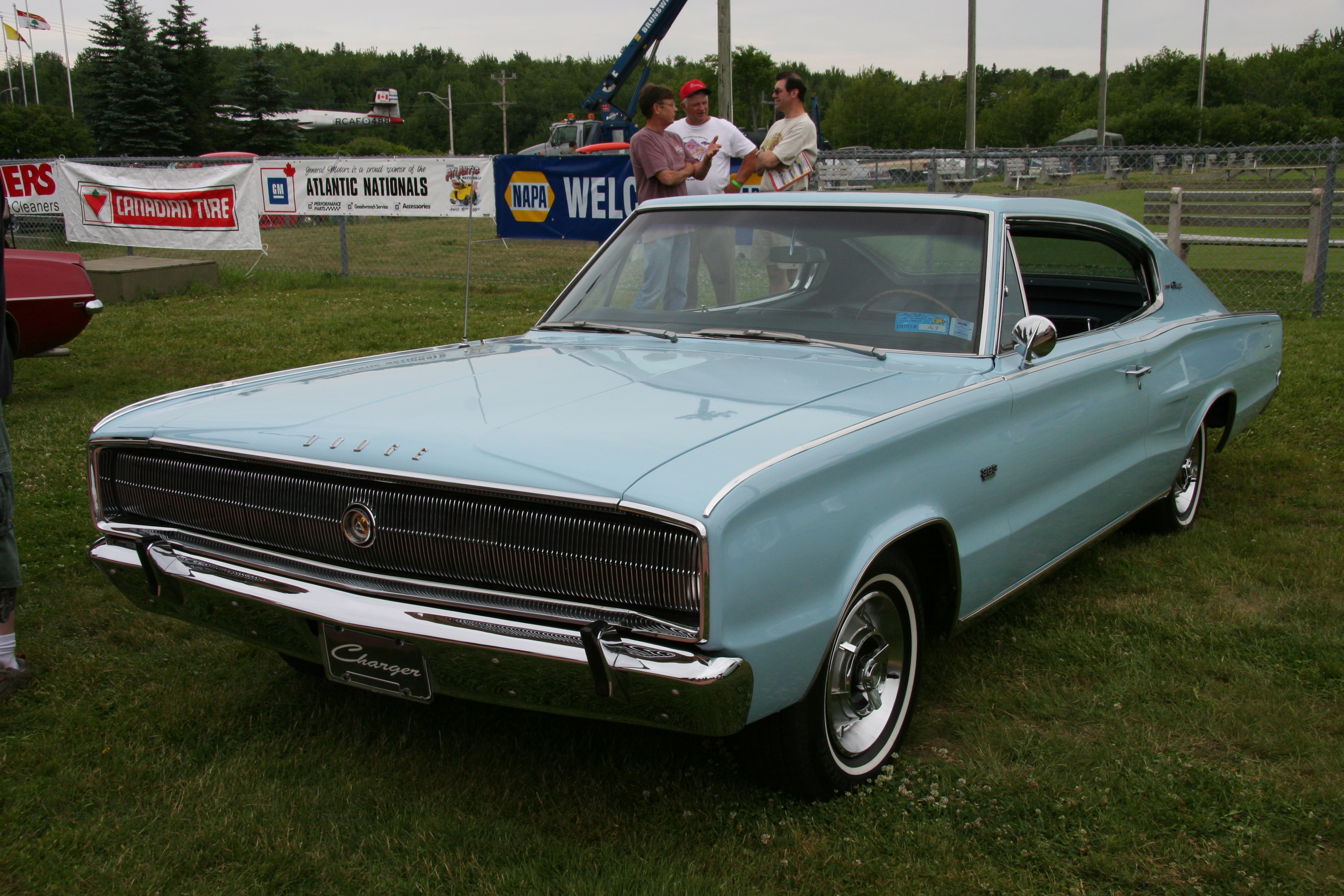
- 1966 Dodge Charger

Overview
- Model years: 1966–1967
- Designer: Carl Cameron

Body and chassis
- Body style: 2-door fastback
- Related: Dodge Coronet; Plymouth Belvedere; Plymouth Satellite; Plymouth GTX

Powertrain
- Engine: 318 cu in (5.2 L) 2bbl A V8 (1966); 318 cu in (5.2 L) 2bbl LA V8 (1967); 361 cu in (5.9 L) 2bbl B V8 (1966); 383 cu in (6.3 L) 2bbl B V8 (1967); 383 cu in (6.3 L) 4bbl B V8; 426 cu in (7.0 L) 2×4bbl Hemi RB V8; 440 cu in (7.2 L) 4bbl RB V8 (1967)
- Transmission: A230 3-speed manual A833 4-speed manual TorqueFlite 3-speed automatic

Dimensions
- Wheelbase: 117.0 in (2,972 mm)
- Length: 203.6 in (5,171 mm)
- Width: 75.8 in (1,925 mm)

=== 1966 ===
The Charger made its debut in mid-1966. Sharing its chassis and front-end sheet-metal with the mid-sized Coronet, the Charger was positioned to take on AMC's conceptually similar Rambler Marlin. It was better looking, but somewhat more expensive, $2,850 to $3,100 ($28,281 to ($30,762 in 2025 dollars).

Significantly, the Charger's interior was different from all other cars, with a full-length center console and "all bucket seating" front and rear, inspired by the 1960-1962 Chrysler 300, and was similar to the 1964 Pontiac 2+2. The rear's pseudo-buckets could be folded down to create interior space accessible via the rear hatch. The upscale Charger was not intended to compete head-to-head with performance-oriented pony cars, but was available with engine options which included Chrysler's famed 426 Hemi (7.0 L) V8.

On January 1, 1966, viewers of the Rose Bowl were first introduced to the new "Leader of the Dodge Rebellion", the 1966 Charger. Designed by Carl "CAM" Cameron, the Charger introduced a fastback roofline and pot-metal "electric shaver" grille, complete with fully rotating headlights, a feature not seen on a Chrysler product since the 1942 DeSoto. The fastback design ended in the rear over a full-width six-lamp taillight with chromed "CHARGER" lettering.

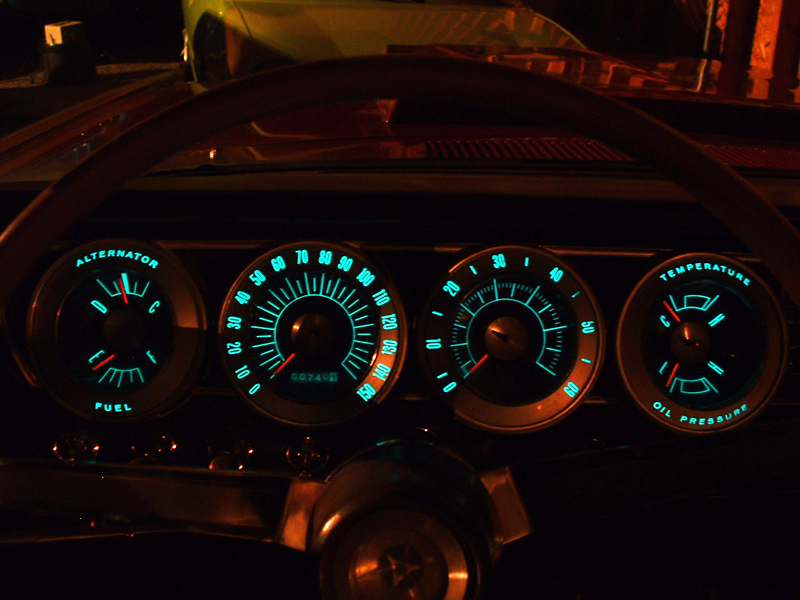
1966 Charger instrument panel

Inside, the standard Charger featured a simulated wood-grain steering wheel, four individual bucket seats with a full-length console from front to rear. The rear seats and rear center armrest pad also folded forward while the trunk divider dropped back, allowing cargo room. Numerous interior features were exclusive to the Charger including door panels, courtesy lights, as well as premium trim and vinyl upholstery. The instrument panel did not use regular bulbs to light the gauges, but rather electroluminescence lit the four chrome-ringed circular dash pods, needles, radio, shifter-position indicator in the console, as well as clock and air conditioning controls if equipped. The dash housed a 0 to 6000 rpm tachometer, a 0 to 150 mph (240 km/h) speedometer, as well as alternator, fuel, and temperature gauges as standard equipment.

Engine selections consisted of only V8s. 1966 transmissions included a three-speed steering-column mounted manual with the base engine, a console-mounted four-speed manual, or a three-speed automatic. In 1966, four engines were offered: the base-model 318 cu in (5.2 L) 2-barrel, the 361 cu in (5.9 L) 2-barrel, the 383 cu in (6.3 L) 4-barrel, and the new 426 Street Hemi. Only 468 Chargers were built with the 426.

Total production in 1966 came to 37,344 units for the mid-model year introduction.

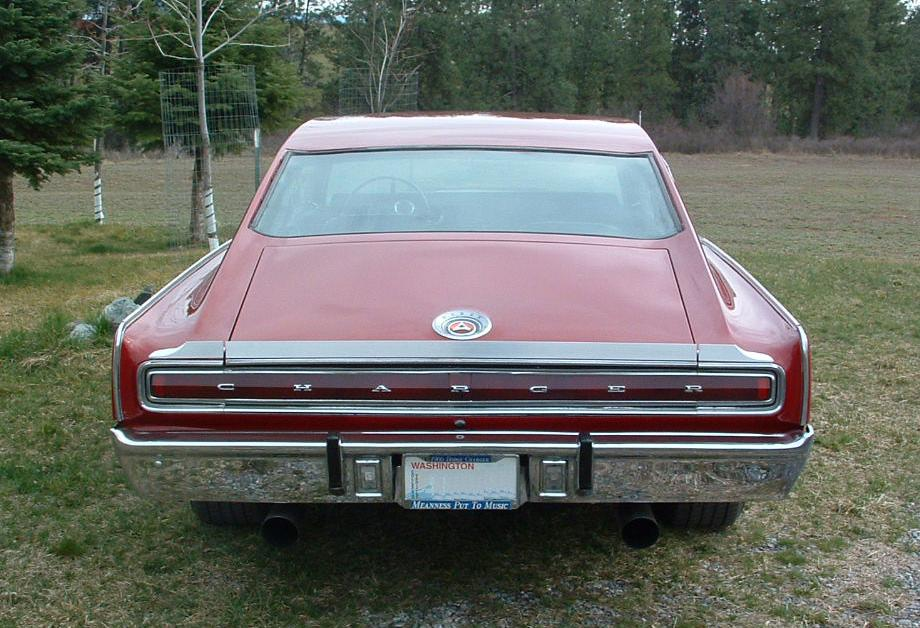
1967 Charger NASCAR spoiler

In 1966, Dodge took the Charger into NASCAR, hoping the fastback would make their car a winner on the high banks. However, the car proved difficult to handle on the faster tracks because its body generated lift. Drivers would later claim that "it was like driving on ice." To solve this problem, Dodge installed a small lip spoiler on the trunk lid that improved traction at speeds above 150 mph (240 km/h). This was made a dealer-installed option in late 1966, and in 1967, because of NASCAR homologation rules, the 1966 Charger became the first U.S. production vehicle to offer a spoiler. (Small quarter panel extensions were added in 1967.) The addition of the spoiler helped David Pearson, driving the #6 Cotton Owens-prepared Dodge cars, to win the NASCAR Grand National championship in 1966 with 15 first-place finishes, though only one, the Capital City 300 in Richmond, VA, was achieved using the Charger.

=== 1967 ===
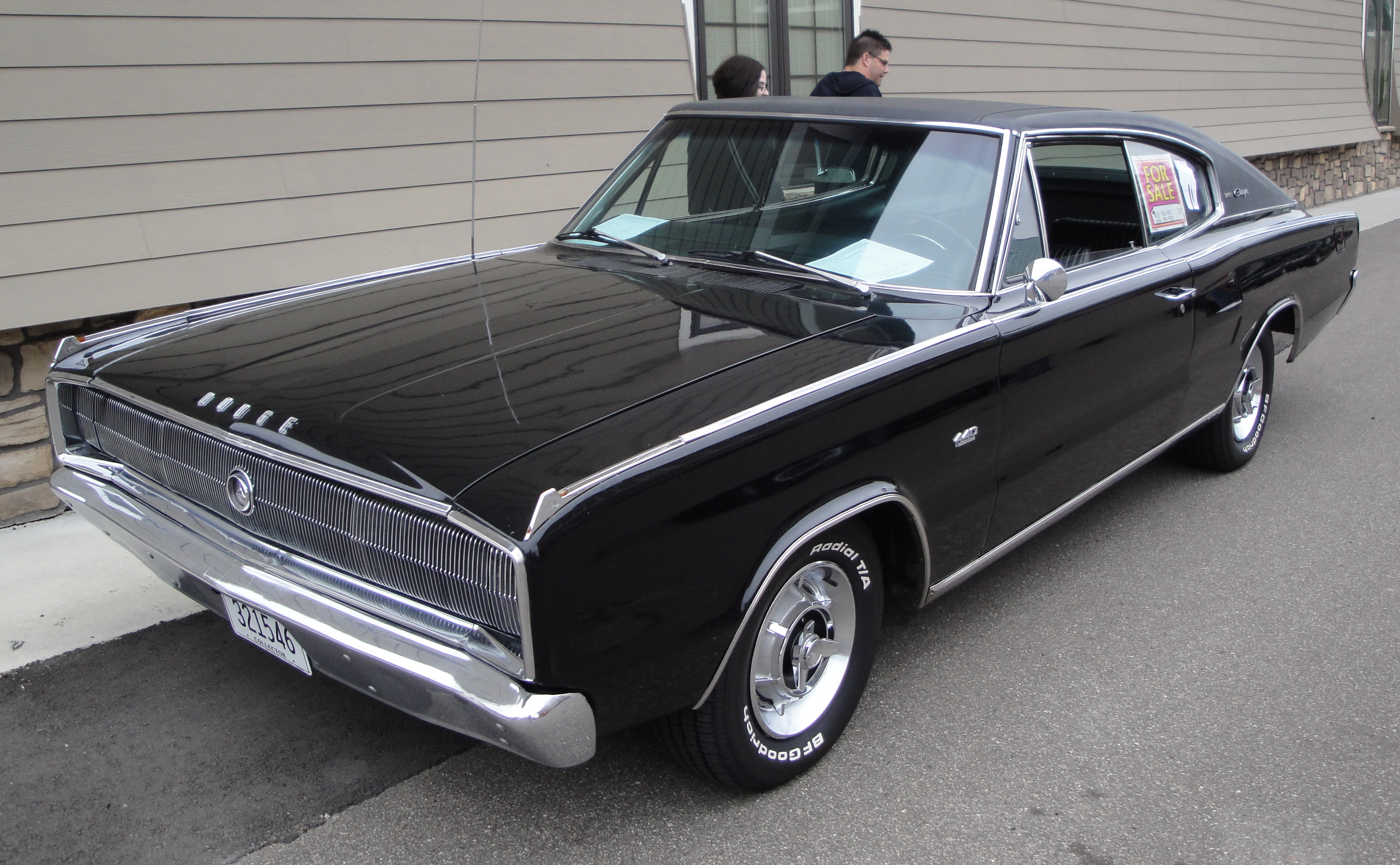
1967 Dodge Charger

The 1967 model year Charger received minor changes. New top-of-fender-mounted turn signal indicators were introduced. These would serve as the primary external identifiers between a 1966 and 1967 Charger. A vinyl roof became available. Inside, the full-length console was eliminated to satisfy customer complaints about the difficulty of entry and exit from the back seats. It was replaced with a regular-sized console. Bucket seats were standard, but a folding armrest/seat and steering column transmission shifter were an option, allowing three people to sit in the front.

The 440 "Magnum" was added and the 361 cu in (5.9 L) V8 was replaced by a 383 cu in (6.3 L) engine. The 440 was rated at 375 bhp (280 kW) with a single 4-barrel carburetor. The 318 two-barrel "LA" Chrysler LA engine was now standard, but with wedge-shaped combustion chambers, unlike the previous 1966 polyspherical (or "poly") design, rated at 230 bhp (170 kW). The 383 4-barrel was rated at 325 bhp (242 kW) and the 426 Street Hemi at 425 bhp (317 kW) remained as options. A total of 118 Chargers were built with the 426 engines in 1967, 58 with a four-speed transmission, and 59 with the automatic. The R/T package was also introduced in 1967.

Sales of the 1967 Chargers dropped to half of the previous introductory half-year with a total of 15,788 units. According to automotive historian Patrick Foster, both the AMC Marlin and the very similar looking first generation Dodge Charger "flopped on the market as sporty car buyers were showing their preference for compact pony cars."

== Second generation ==
Second generation
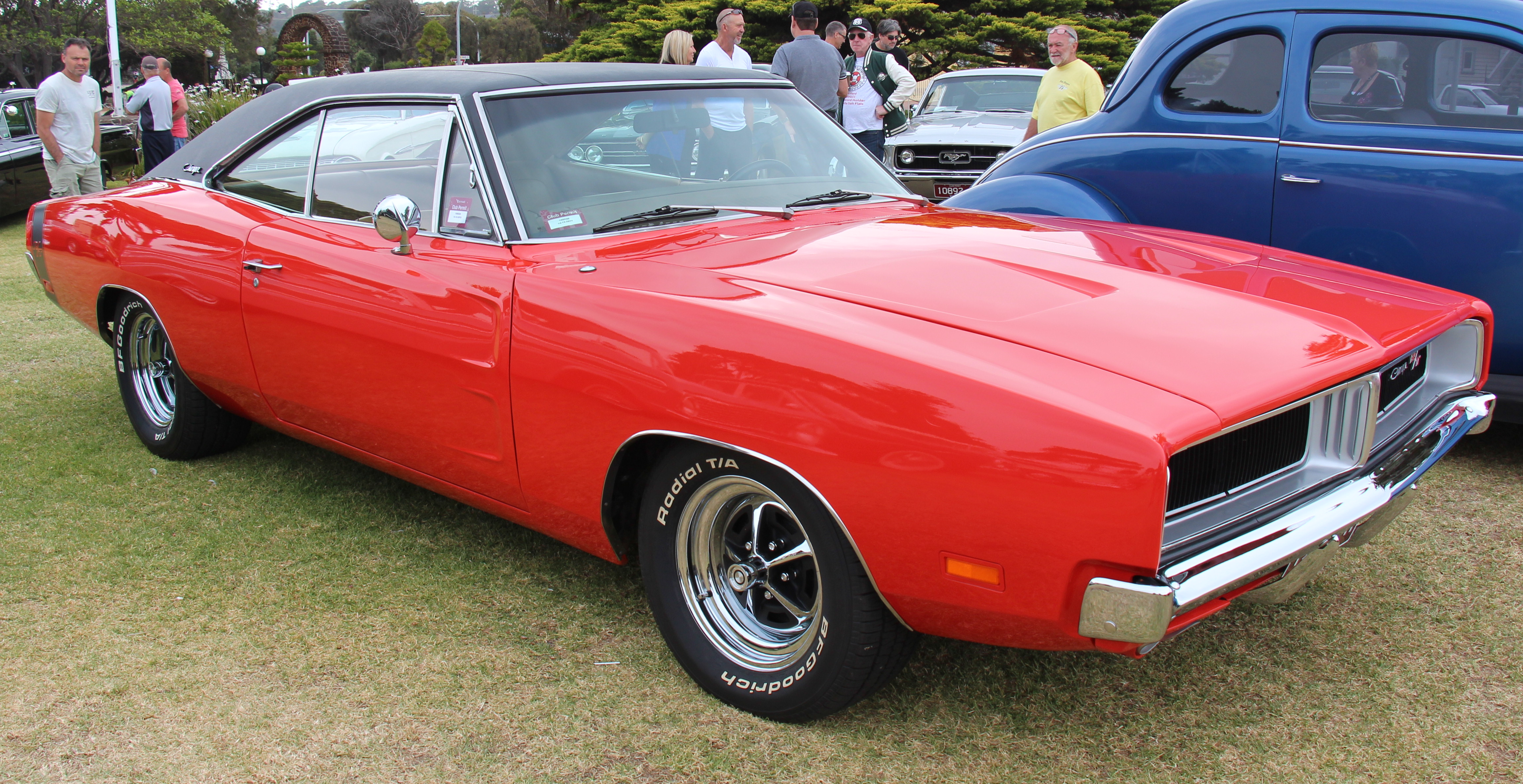
- 1969 Dodge Charger R/T

Overview
- Model years: 1968–1970
- Assembly: United States: Detroit, Michigan; Hamtramck, Michigan; Los Angeles, California; St. Louis, Missouri
- Designer: Harvey J. Winn, Richard Sias, Bill Brownlie, Diran Yazejian

Body and chassis
- Body style: 2-door hardtop
- Related: Dodge Coronet; Plymouth Belvedere; Plymouth Satellite; Plymouth GTX; Plymouth Road Runner

Powertrain
- Engine: 225 cu in (3.7 L) 1bbl I6; 318 cu in (5.2 L) 2bbl LA V8; 383 cu in (6.3 L) 2bbl B V8; 383 cu in (6.3 L) 4bbl B V8; 426 cu in (7.0 L) 2×4bbl Hemi V8; 440 cu in (7.2 L) 4bbl RB V8; 440 cu in (7.2 L) 3×2 RB (1970)
- Transmission: A904 3-speed automatic A727 3-speed automatic A230 3-speed manual A833 4-speed manual

Dimensions
- Wheelbase: 117.0 in (2,972 mm)
- Length: 208.0 in (5,283 mm) (1968-69); 207.9 in (5,281 mm) (1970)
- Width: 76.7 in (1,948 mm) (1968-69); 76.6 in (1,946 mm) (1970)
- Height: 53.2 in (1,351 mm) (1968-69); 53.0 in (1,346 mm) (1970)
- Curb weight: 3,424–3,979 lb (1,553–1,805 kg) (1968); 3,285–3,803 lb (1,490–1,725 kg) (1969); 3,395–3,891 lb (1,540–1,765 kg) (1970)

=== 1968 ===
The entire B-body lineup for the 1968 model year was redesigned, and the Charger was further differentiated from the Dodge Coronet models. Less upscale than the first generation, the new model featured coke bottle styling by Richard Sias, with curves around the front fenders and rear quarter panels. Harvey J. Winn designed the front and rear end sheet metal. The fastback roof was gone, in favor of a "flying buttress" similar to that of the 1966-67 Pontiac GTO. The rear end featured a "kick up" spoiler appearance, reminiscent of the first generation's optional trunk lid spoiler. The Charger retained its full-width hidden headlight grille, but a vacuum-operated cover replaced the electric motor-powered rotating headlights. The previous full-width taillights were replaced with dual circular units at the direction of Styling Vice President, Elwood P. Engel. Dual scallops were added to the doors and hood.

Inside, numerous "downscalings" were evident. A conventional fixed rear bench seat replaced the folding bucket seat design. The conventional trunk area included a vinyl mat, rather than the previous model's carpeted cargo area. The center console in the front remained, but there was no center armrest. The tachometer was now optional, and the electroluminescent gauges were replaced with a conventional design.

The Charger's engine options were reduced midyear when the standard 318 cu in (5.2 L) 2-bbl V8, was replaced with Chrysler's 225 cu in (3.7 L) slant-six. The 383-2 and 383-4 remained unchanged.

==== R/T ====
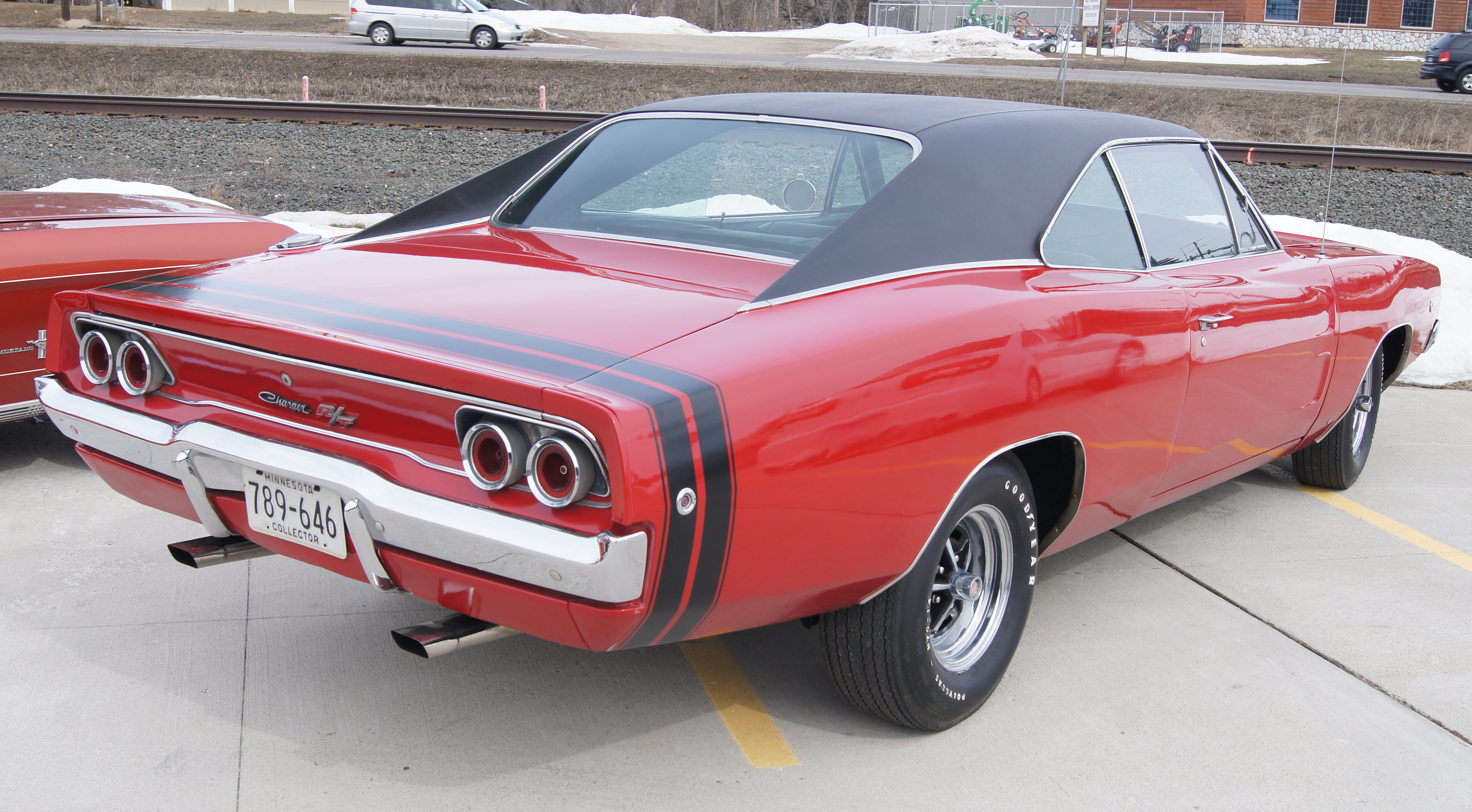
1968 Charger R/T

A new high-performance package was added, the R/T ("Road/Track", not to be confused with the Road & Track magazine). The R/T came standard with the previous year's 440 Magnum, with the 426 Hemi optional. With either, the Charger had evolved into possibly the top Chrysler-made muscle car.

In 1968, Chrysler Corporation began a marketing campaign featuring a cartoon bee with an engine on its back promoting models called the "Scat Pack". The Coronet R/T, Super Bee, Dart GTS, and Charger R/T received bumble-bee stripes (of two thin stripes framing two thick ones). The stripes were standard on the R/Ts and came in red, white, or black, but could be deleted at no extra cost.

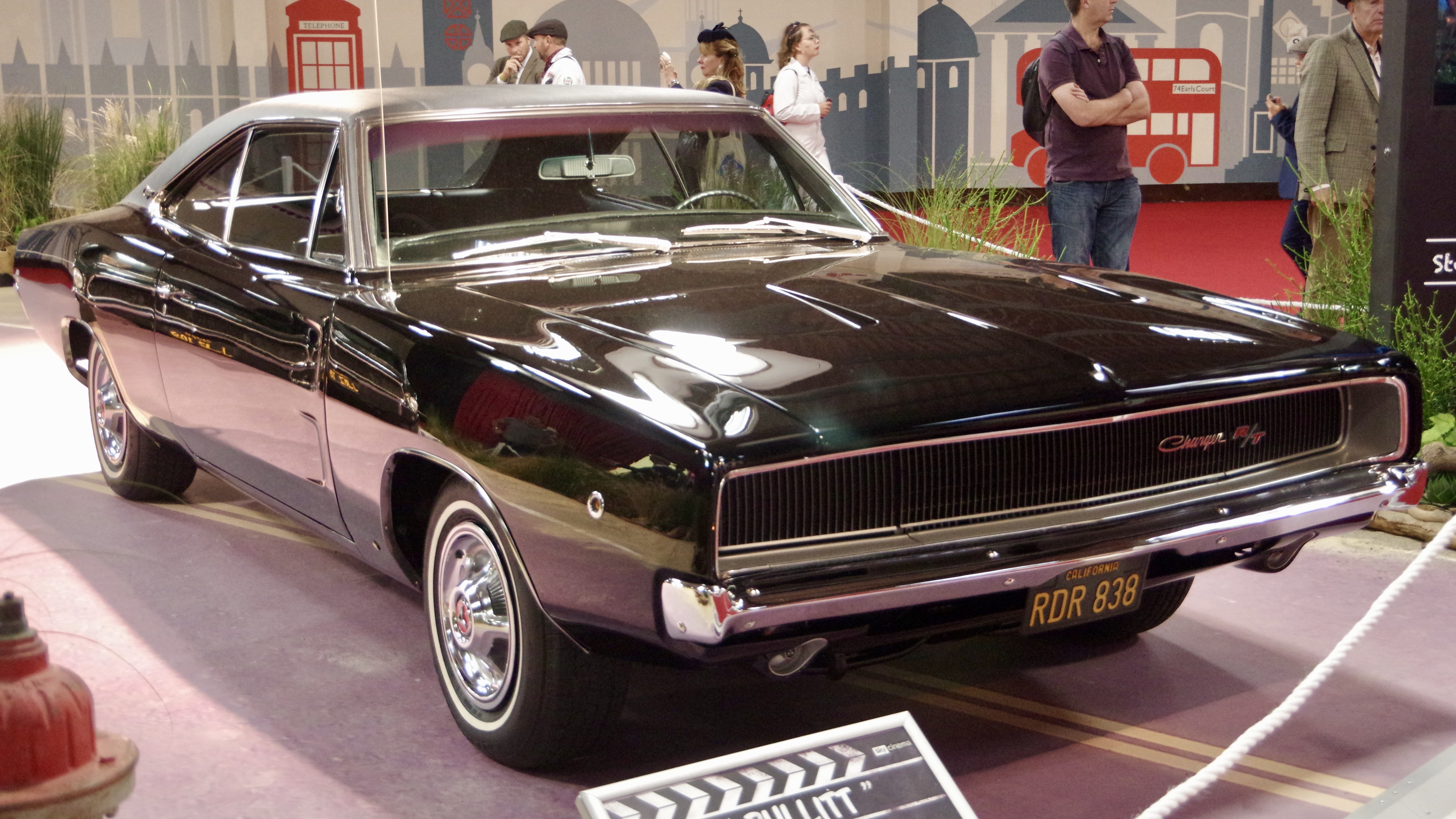
One of the 1968 Charger R/T movie cars used in Bullitt

The 1968 film Bullitt helped popularize the Charger R/T for its notable car chase sequence alongside the titular character's 1968 Ford Mustang GT through the streets of San Francisco, which has been regarded as one of the most influential car chase scenes in movie history. In the film, a black Charger R/T 440 is chased by Steve McQueen's Mustang GT, jumping on the San Francisco slopes. The 1968 model year Charger sales increased to 96,100, including over 17,000 Charger R/Ts.

=== 1969 ===
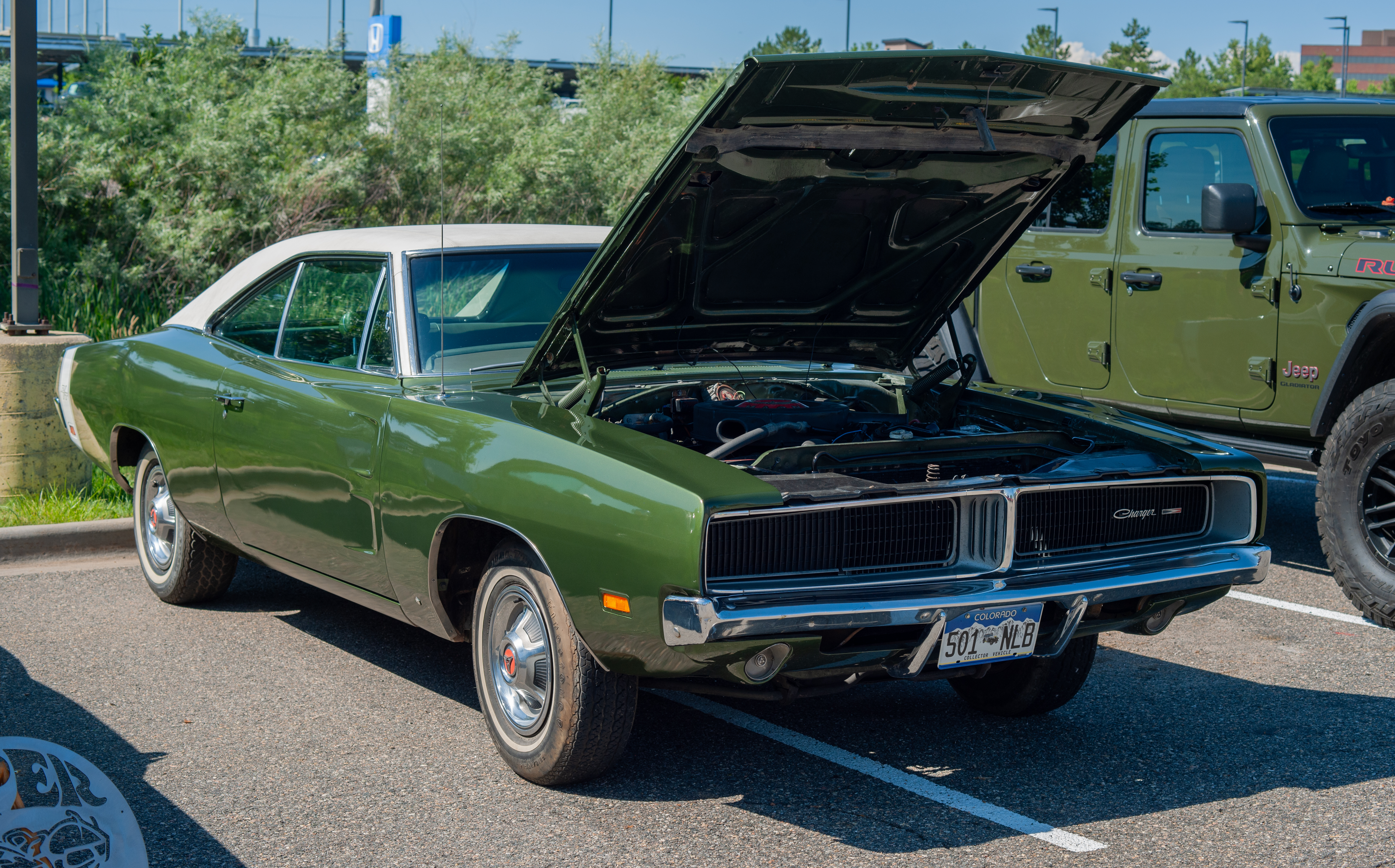
1969 Charger

The 1969 model year brought a few modifications. Exterior changes included a new grille with a center divider and new longitudinal taillights designed by Harvey J. Winn. A new trim line called the Special Edition (SE) was added. This could be available by itself or with the R/T, thus making an R/T-SE. The SE added leather inserts to only the front seats, chrome rocker moldings, a wood grain steering wheel, and wood grain inserts on the instrument panel. A sunroof was added to the options list, but was ordered on only 260 Chargers. The bumblebee stripes returned, but were changed slightly. Instead of four stripes, it now consisted of a wide stripe framed by two smaller stripes. In the middle of the stripe, an R/T cutout was placed. If the stripe was deleted, a metal R/T emblem was placed where the R/T cutout was. Total production was around 89,199 units.

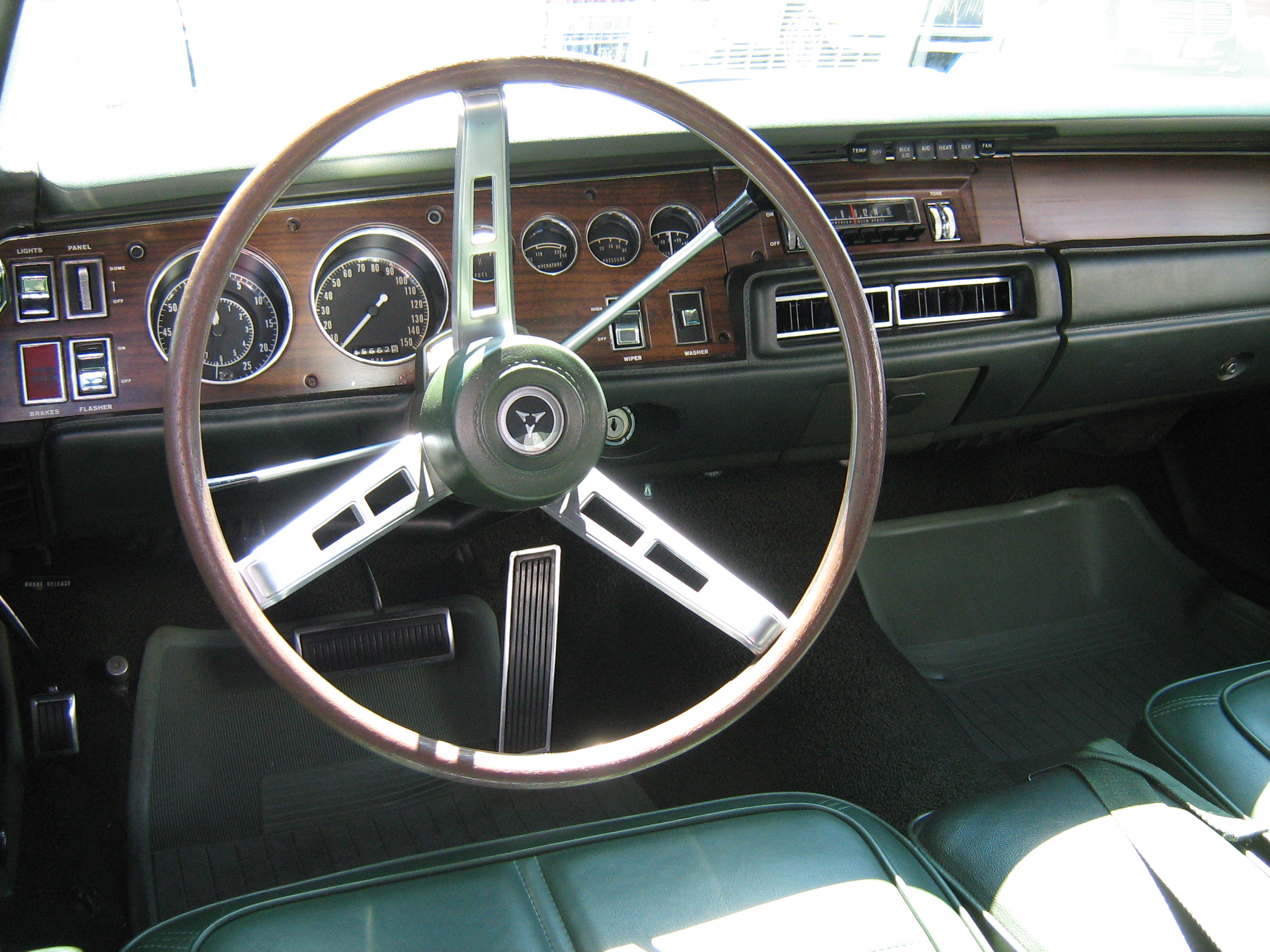
1969 Charger SE Interior, Chrysler interior paint code CRG

There were two different 383 engines available for the 1969 model year: 2-barrel and 4-barrel. The 2-barrel was rated at 290 hp (220 kW). The four-barrel engine was rated at 330 hp (250 kW) and was identified on the air cleaner as "383 / FOUR BARREL". The 330-hp engine was unique to the Charger model in 1969. While this engine was available with an un-silenced air cleaner option, it differed internally from the 335-hp 383 "Magnum". Differences between the 330-hp 383 4-barrel and 335-hp 383 mainly were internal. Both versions used the Carter AVS carb and the larger exhaust manifolds from the 440 Magnum engines, but the Magnum had a windage tray in the oil pan, a different camshaft profile, and different valve springs. In 1969, the B-series engines were all painted with Chrysler Engine Turquoise, except the 4-barrel 383 four-speed and 440 Magnum engines, which were painted with Chrysler "High-Performance Orange". As usual, the 426 Hemi was painted "Street Hemi Orange". The 383 Magnum motor was used in Road Runners and Super Bees, but did not appear in a Charger body until 1971.

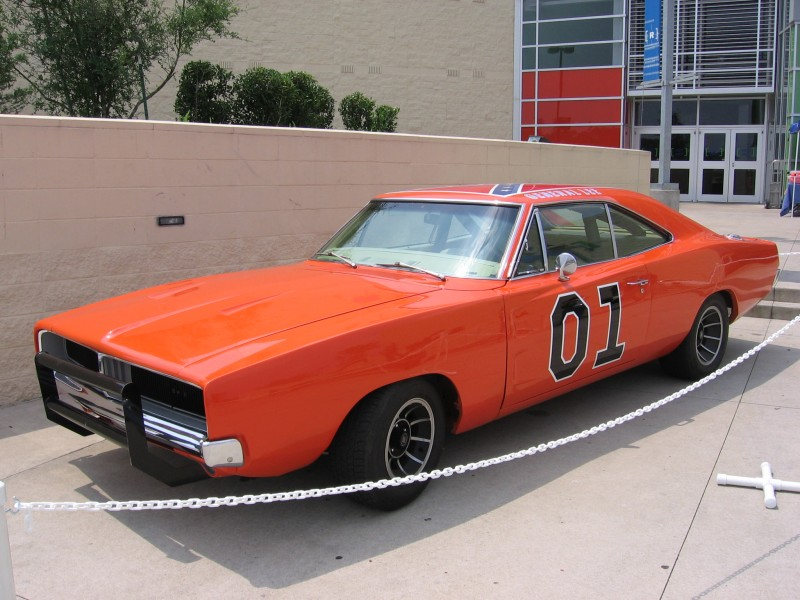
Bo & Luke Duke popularized the 1969 Charger in The Dukes of Hazzard

The television series The Dukes of Hazzard (1979–1985) featured an orange-painted 1969 Charger named The General Lee. "The General" sported the Confederate battle flag painted on the roof and the words "GENERAL LEE" over each door. The windows were always open, as the doors were supposedly welded shut for racing, and the actors would do a window slide to get in and out. The number "01" is painted on both doors. Also, when the horn button was pressed, it played the first 12 notes from the de facto Confederate States anthem "Dixie". The car performed spectacular jumps in almost every episode, and the show's popularity produced consumer interest in the car.

==== Charger 500 ====
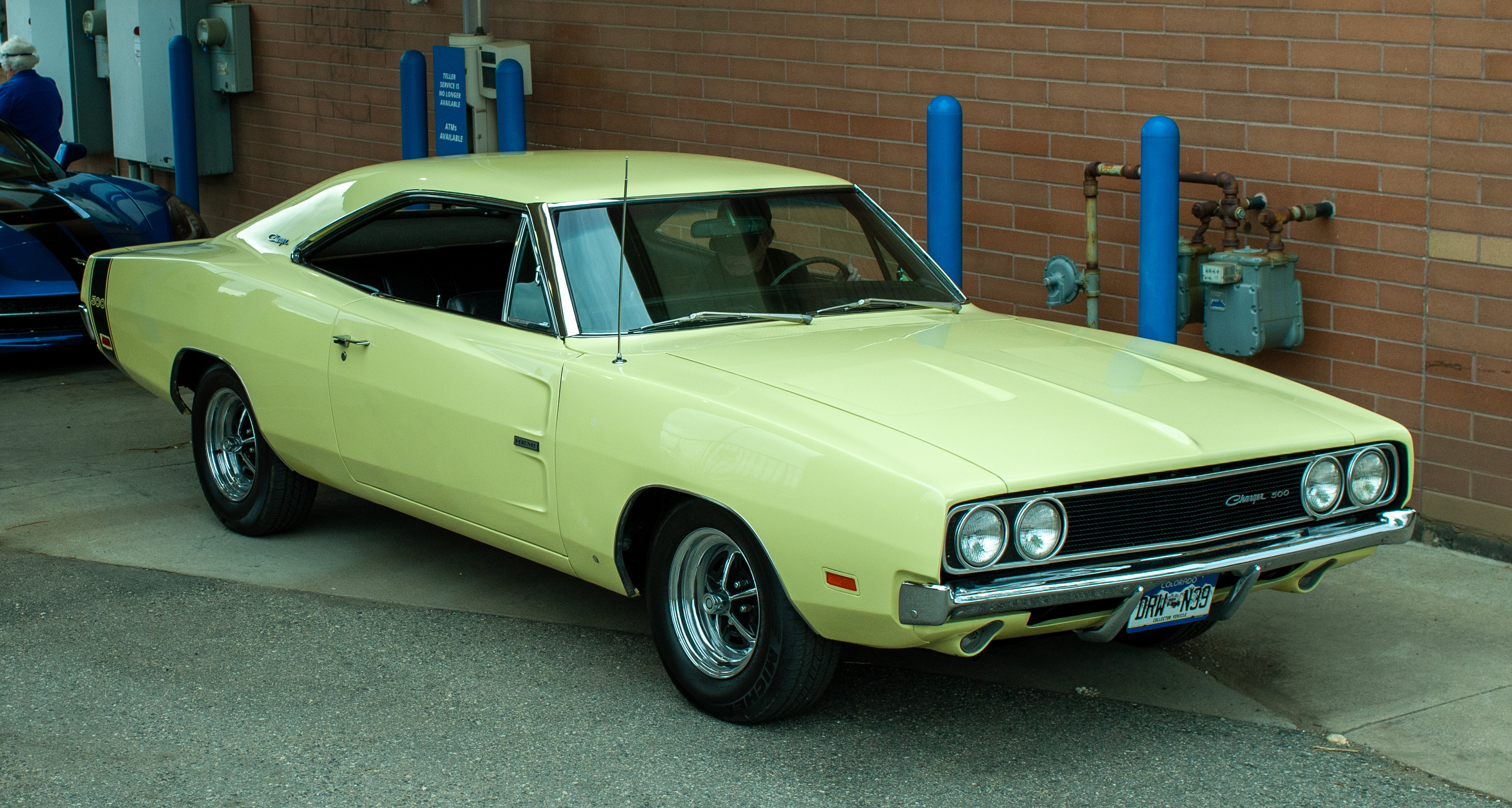
1969 Charger 500

In 1968, the NASCAR inspired Charger R/T failed to beat the Ford cars (the Ford Torino Talladega and the Mercury Cyclone Spoiler II) on the high-banks oval-tracks. Wind tunnel tests showed the tunneled rear window caused lift, and the gaping mouth induced drag. As a result, Dodge made the rear window flush with the rest of the roof and put a 1968 Coronet grille in the front.

The original Charger 500 prototype was a 1968 Charger R/T with a 426 Hemi and automatic transmission. The prototype was painted in B5 Blue with a white stripe and a white interior. The Charger 500 was one of three models introduced in September 1968. The standard engine was the 440 Magnum, but factory literature described the 426 Hemi as standard. The Charger 500 had the Torqueflite standard and the same equipment standard as the R/T.

A total of 392 Charger 500s were made, of which only 67 had the 426 Hemi engine, 27 with a 4-speed, and 40 with an automatic transmission.

==== Charger Daytona ====
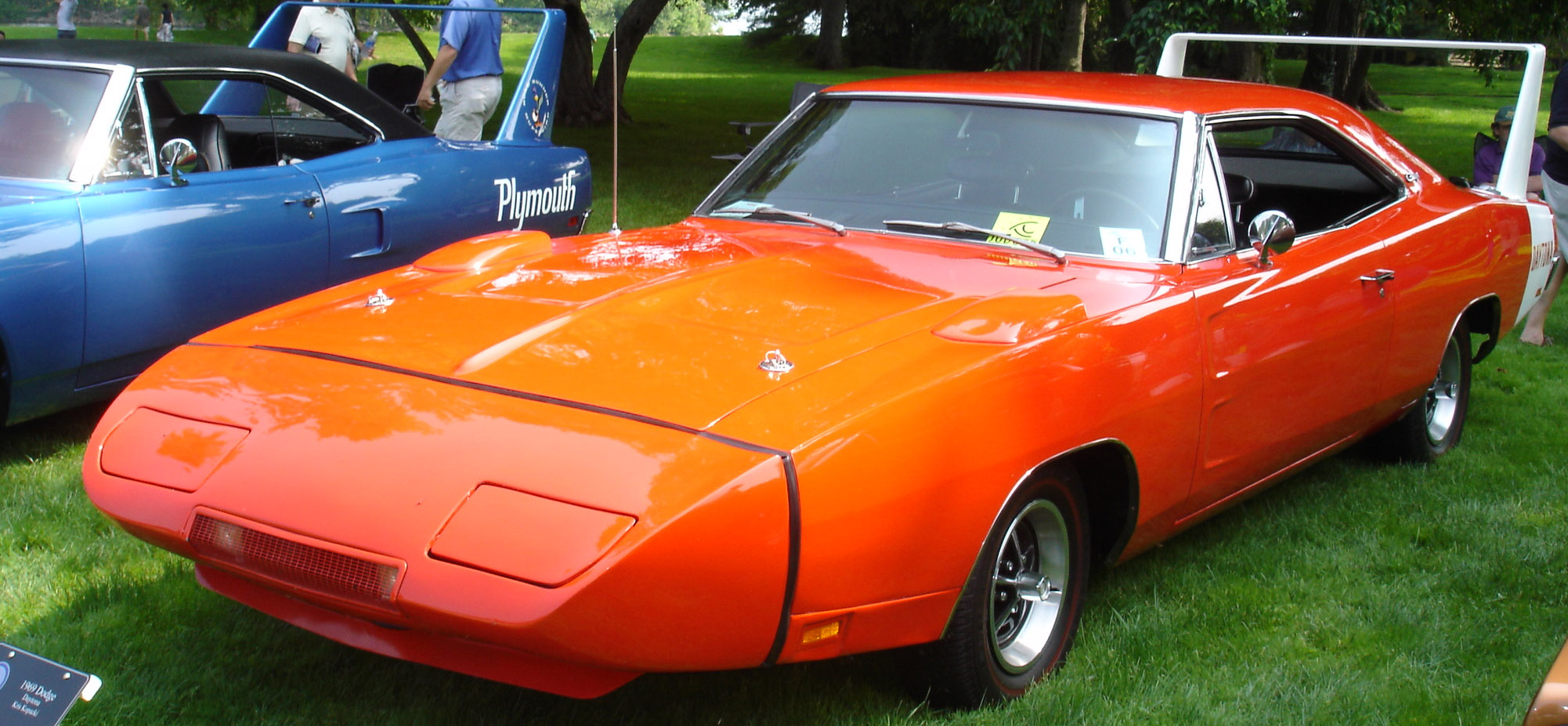
Charger Daytona

Dodge was not satisfied with the results of the Charger 500. The car was insufficient to beat the other aero cars on the NASCAR circuit. After months of research and development, including at the aftermarket shop, Creative Industries, the Charger Daytona was introduced on April 13, 1969. It received over 1,000 orders.

Chrysler made many attempts at improving the aerodynamics of the 500 by adding noses rumored to be up to 23 in (584 mm) long. The Charger Daytona finally received an 18 in (457 mm) nose. The full-size Charger Daytona was tested with an 18 in (457 mm) nose at Martin Marietta's facility in Georgia. The test was a success, and the project was greenlighted. The nose piece was only part of the innovation. The Charger Daytona also received a 23 in (584 mm) tall wing in the rear. This wing was bolted through the rear quarter panels and into the rear subframe. Although proven less effective than shorter wing designs, the engineer responsible for the development of the wing, John Pointer, chose the tall design so the wing would be in "clean air" to help increase the car's overall speed. That the tall wing prevents interference with the operation of the trunk lid can be considered a fortunate coincidence. The tall wing also helped in an unintended way, by giving the car directional stability due to its deeply splinted sides.

The Charger Daytona engineering model was tested on the Chelsea, Michigan Chrysler Proving Grounds on July 20, 1969. Driven by Charlie Glotzbach and Buddy Baker, it was clocked at 205 mph (330 km/h) with a small 4-bbl. carburetor. The Charger Daytona's nose made 1,200 pounds of downforce, and the wing made 600 pounds of downforce. The Dodge styling department wanted to change the Charger Daytona as soon as they saw it, but Bob McCurry told him to back off; he wanted function over finesse.

The Charger Daytona introduced to the public had a fiberglass nose without actual headlamps and a wing without streamlined fairings. Marketing representatives claimed the reverse scoops on the front fenders were for tire clearance, but their purpose was to reduce drag by 3% by ventilating trapped air from the wheel wells.

The Charger Daytona came standard with the 440 Magnum Engine with 375 hp (280 kW) and 480 lb⋅ft (651 N⋅m) of torque, A727 Torqueflite Automatic Transmission, and a 3.23 489 Case 8 3/4 Chrysler Differential. Optional was the 426 Hemi with 425 hp (317 kW) and 490 lb⋅ft (664 N⋅m). The 426 Hemi was also available with the no-cost option of the A833 4-Speed Manual. A total of 503 Charger Daytona's were produced as U.S. cars. (An additional 40 were for Canada), Of the 503 U.S. cars produced, 433 were 440 Magnum, 139 4-Speed, and 294 Torqueflite; 70 were 426 Hemi power, 22 4-Speed, and 48 Torqueflite.

The Daytona was discontinued to make the 1970 Plymouth Superbird the only Chrysler winged car for the model year. While Daytonas campaigned through the 1970 season, only one Daytona was raced until 1971 (in the 1971 Daytona 500) when NASCAR decreed that engine displacement of wing cars would be limited to 305 cu in (5.0 L). That car, driven by Dick Brooks, finished in seventh place.

=== 1970 ===
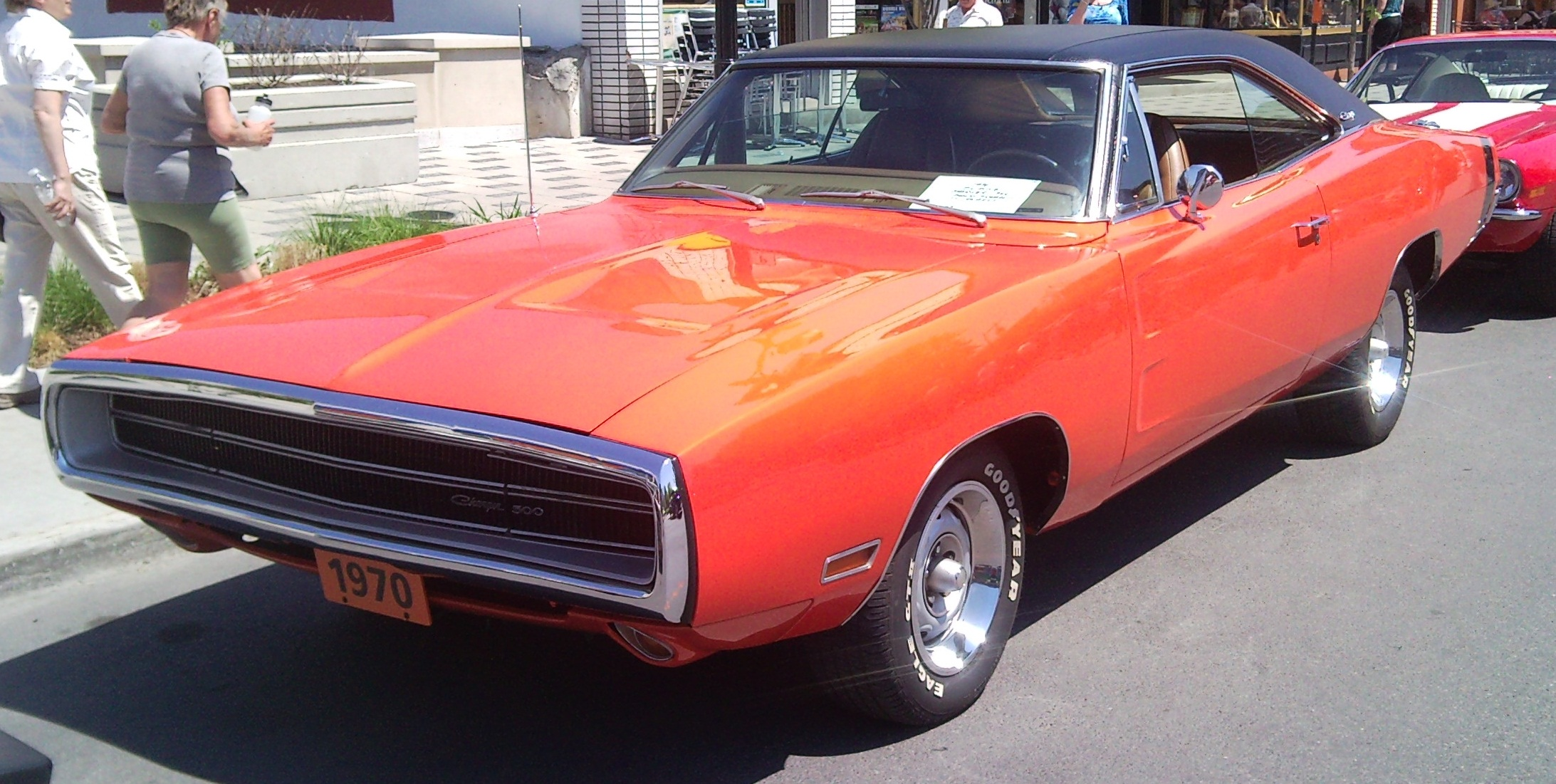
1970 Charger

The Charger was changed slightly for the 1970 model year. This was the last year of the 2nd generation Charger and featured a large wraparound chrome bumper, and the grille was no longer divided in the middle. New electric headlight doors replaced the old vacuum style. The taillights were similar to those used in 69, but 500 and R/T models came with a new taillight panel. On the R/T, new rear-facing scoops with the R/T logo were mounted on the front doors, over the door scallops. A new 440 or HEMI hood cutout made the option list for this year only. The 1970 Dodge Charger was placed in The Fast and The Furious and several other movies.

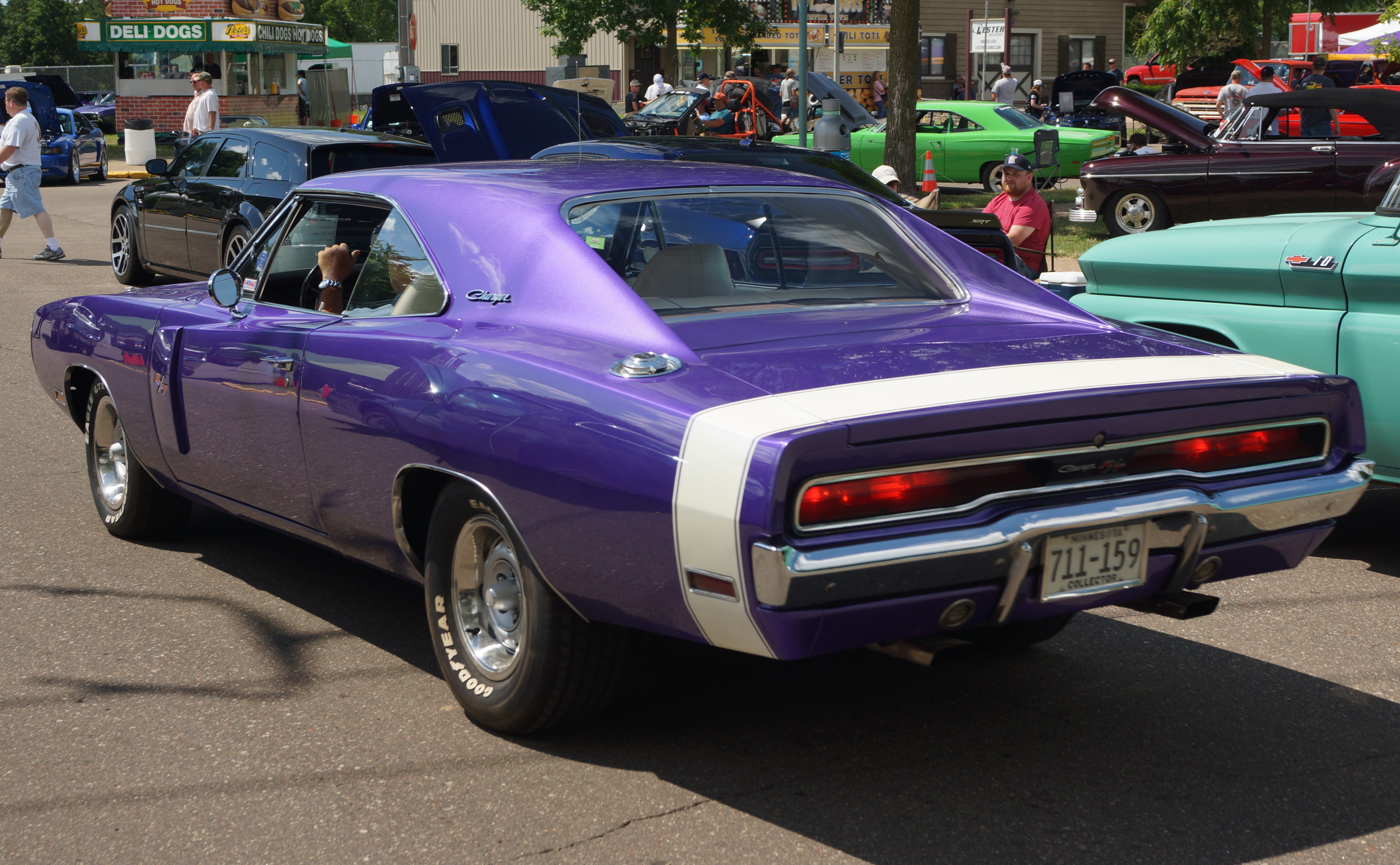
1970 Charger R/T

Dodge painted the hood scallop inserts black and put the silver engine callouts on top. New "High Impact" colors were given names, such as "Top Banana", and "Panther Pink".

Interior changes included new high-back bucket seats, the revised door panels, and the map pockets were now optional instead of standard. The ignition was moved from the dash to the steering column (as with all Chrysler products this year), and the glove box was now hinged at the bottom instead of the top as in 1968–1969. The SE "Special Edition" trim option added luxury features and was available in the 500 SE and R/T SE versions. A new pistol grip shifter and a bench front seat were introduced, a first for the Charger since its debut.

A new engine option made the Charger's list for the first time, the 440 Six Pack. With three two-barrel carburetors and a rating of 390 hp (291 kW), it was one of the most exotic setups since the cross-ram Max Wedge engines of the early 1960s. The Six Pack was previously used on the mid-year 1969 Dodge Super Bee and Plymouth Road Runner. Despite this new engine, production slipped again to 46,576 mainly due to the new E-body Dodge Challenger pony car, as well as rapidly increasing automobile insurance rates. In the 1970 NASCAR season, the 1970 Charger had ten wins, more than any other car, including the 1969 Charger Daytonas and Plymouth Superbirds, thus giving Bobby Isaac the Grand National Championship. Driving the blue #88 Engineering Daytona, Buddy Baker was the first and only legal car to run over 200 mph in 1970. That record lasted for over 13 years.

== Third generation ==
Third generation
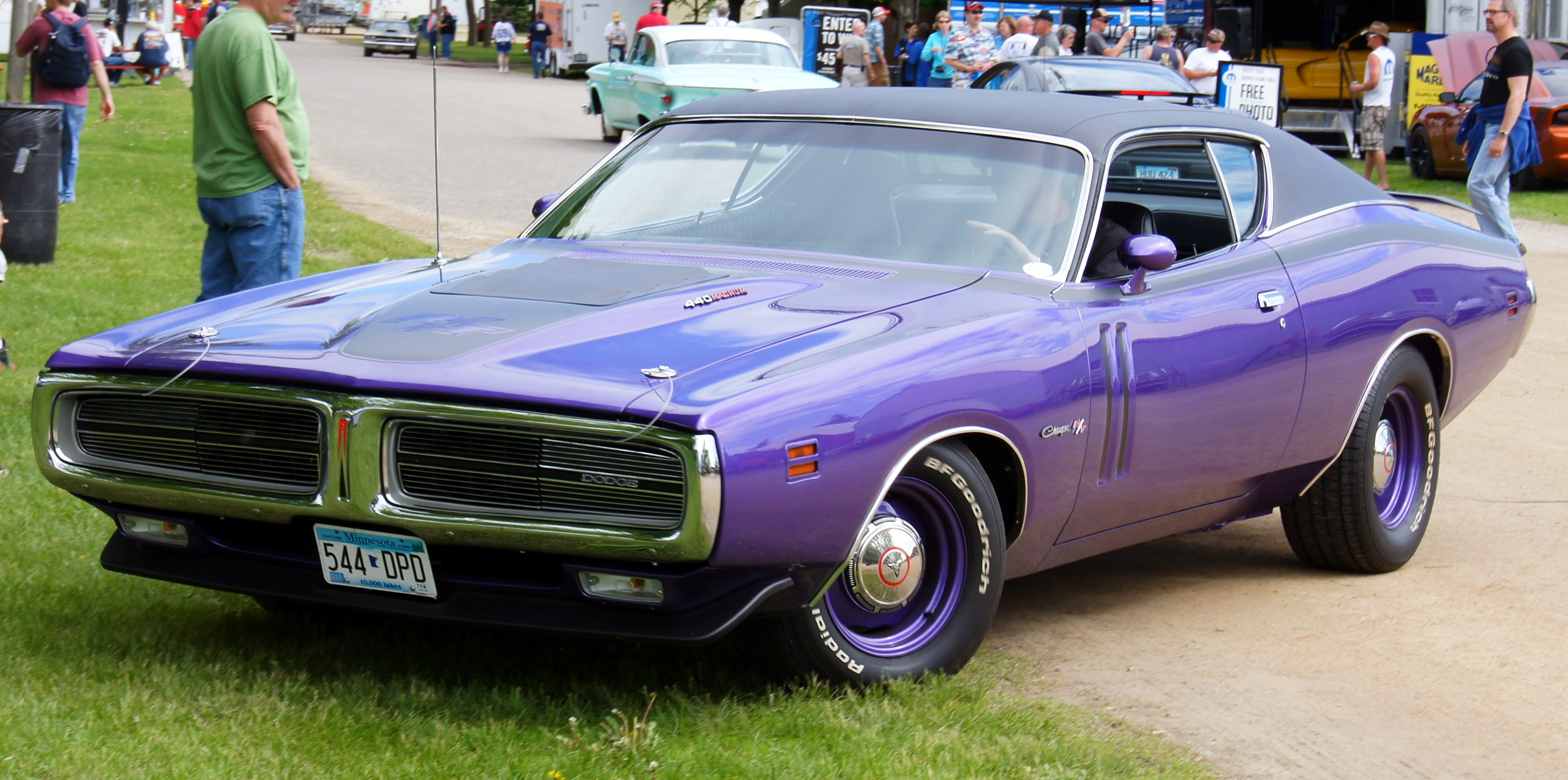
- 1971 Dodge Charger R/T

Overview
- Model years: 1971–1974
- Assembly: United States: Detroit, Michigan; Hamtramck, Michigan; Los Angeles, California (1971 only); St. Louis, Missouri

Body and chassis
- Body style: 2-door hardtop/coupe
- Related: Dodge Coronet; Plymouth Satellite; Plymouth GTX; Plymouth Road Runner

Powertrain
- Engine: 225 cu in (3.7 L) I6; 318 cu in (5.2 L) V8; 340 cu in (5.6 L) V8; 360 cu in (5.9 L) V8; 383 cu in (6.3 L) V8; 400 cu in (6.6 L) V8; 426 cu in (7.0 L) V8 (1971 only); 440 cu in (7.2 L) V8
- Transmission: 3-speed automatic; 3-speed manual; 4-speed manual

Dimensions
- Wheelbase: 115.0 in (2,921 mm)
- Length: 205.0 in (5,207 mm)
- Height: 53.0 in (1,346 mm)

=== 1971 ===
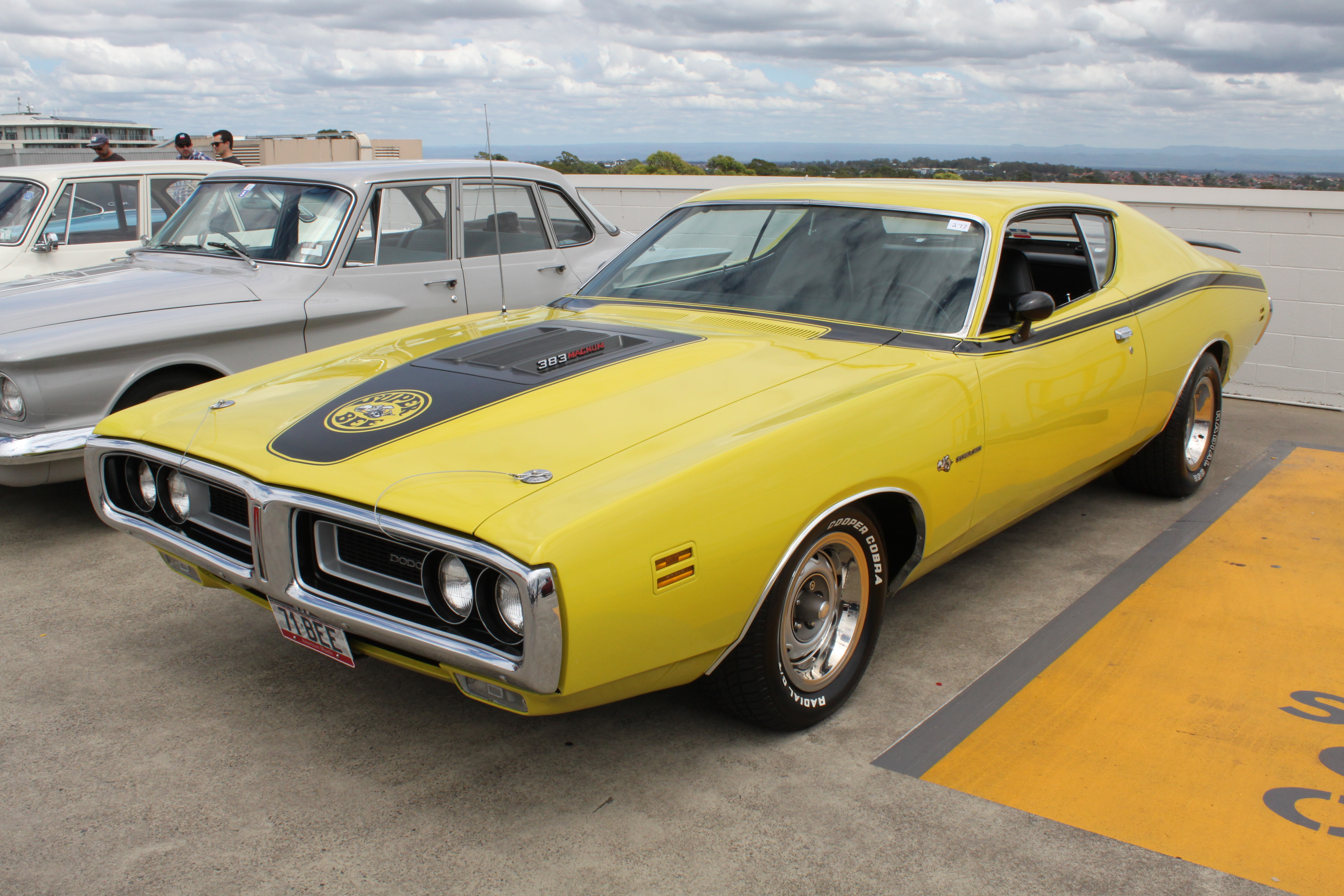
1971 Charger Super Bee

The third generation Charger debuted for the 1971 model year with a new "fuselage" sheet metal and a new split grille. The interiors were like those of the E-body and were now shared by the Plymouth B-body, the Plymouth Satellite Sebring, and the Road Runner. The hidden headlights were now optional. A rear spoiler and a "Ramcharger" hood were new options. This hood featured a pop-up scoop mounted above the air cleaner controlled by a vacuum switch under the dash. On Plymouth Road Runners, it was called the "Air Grabber" hood and was previously used on the Coronet R/T and Super Bee.

Dodge also merged its Coronet and Charger lines. From 1971, all four-door B-bodies were badged as Coronets and all two-door B-bodies as Chargers. Thus, for only one year, the Super Bee became part of the Charger lineup, after which it was discontinued. From 1971 to 1974, Charger models used the Coronet's VIN prefix "W".

Several other models were carried over from 1970, including the 500, R/T, and SE. Sales of the R/T declined due in part to higher insurance costs and gasoline prices. A total of 63 Hemi RTs were built that year, marking its last appearance in any production car, and 2,659 with other engines. The 1971 model year was also the last for the 440 Six-Pack engine, which could still be mated to a 4-speed manual transmission with an optional Hurst shifter and the automatic. In the Super Bee's final year, the 340 became a $44 option over the standard, low-compression 383 V8.

The "Hi-Impact" colors were discontinued after the 1971 model year; with a 1971-only "Citron Yella".

=== 1972 ===
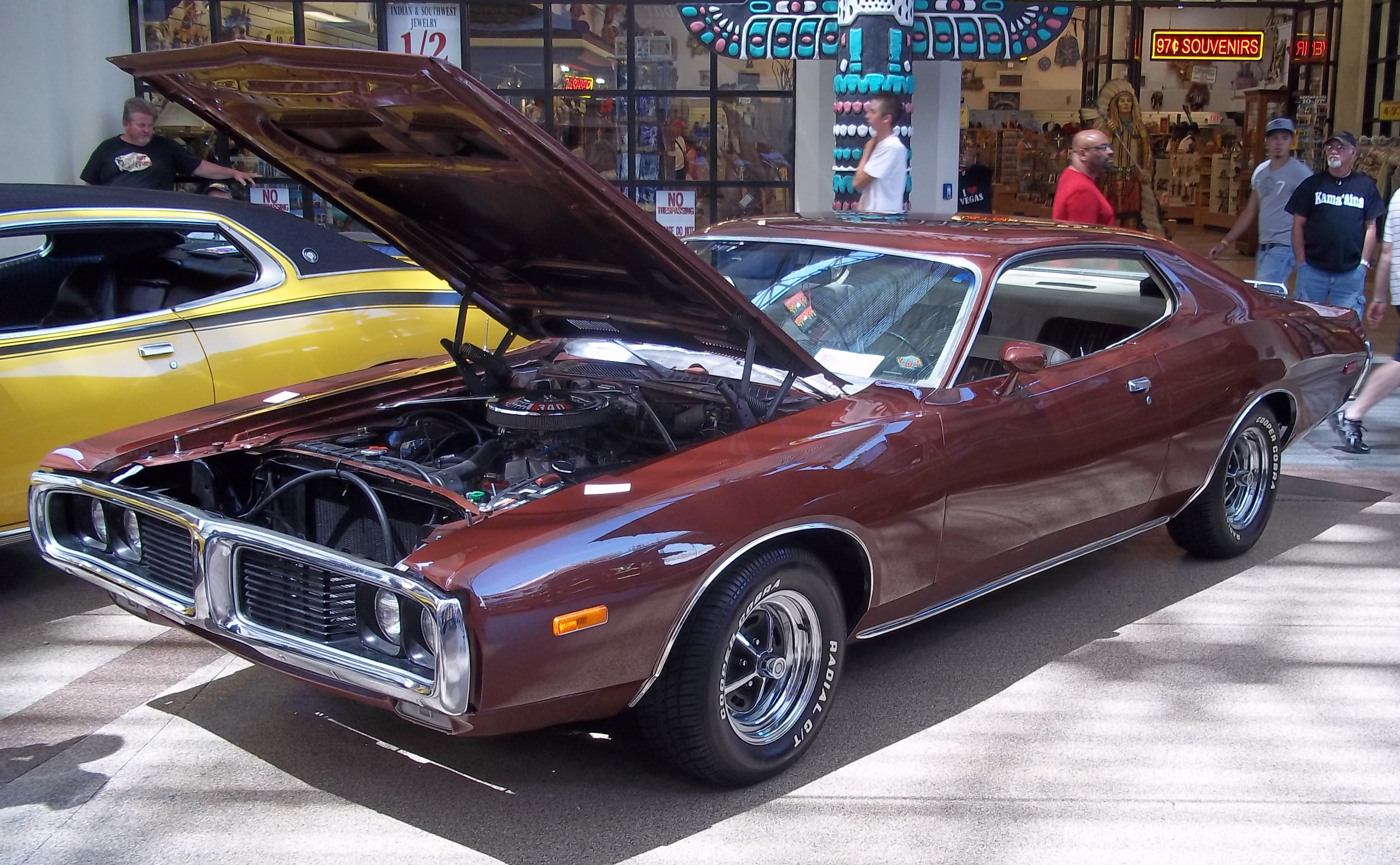
1972 Charger Rallye

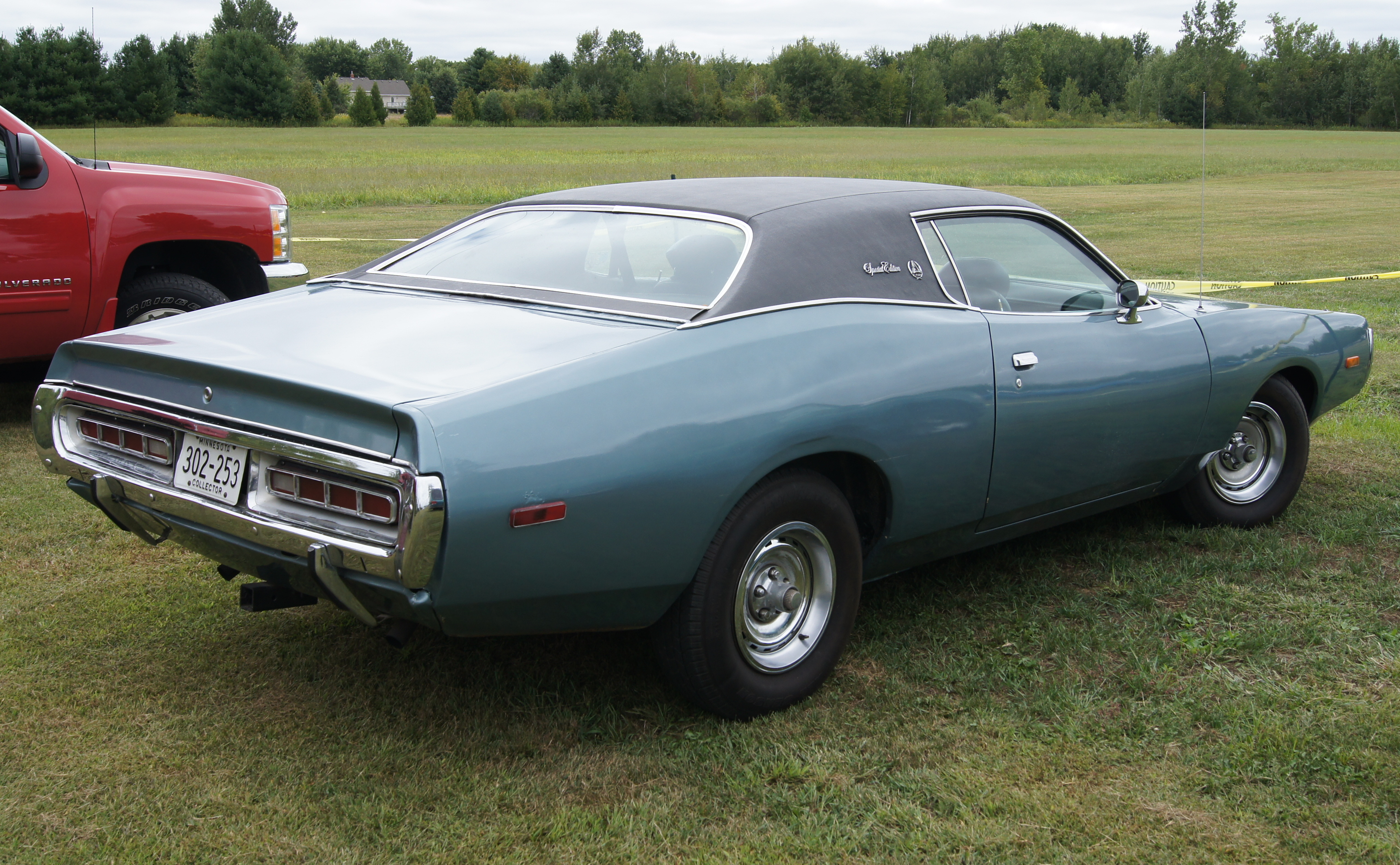
1972 Charger SE

The 1972 Charger introduced a new "Rallye" option to replace the R/T version. The SE was differentiated from other 1972 Chargers by a unique formal roof treatment and hidden headlights. The 383 engine was replaced with a lower compression 4-barrel 400, while the 440 engine was rated at a more realistic 280 hp (209 kW; 284 PS) SAE net instead of the previous 350 hp (261 kW; 355 PS) SAE gross. Beginning in 1972, all engines featured hardened valve seats to permit regular leaded or unleaded gasoline rather than leaded premium fuel as in past years due to tighter emissions regulations. Though the 440+6 (designating a triple 2-barrel carb setup and 310 bhp (231 kW; 314 PS) was listed in the early 1972 sales literature, it was found in the August 1971 testing that this engine would not meet the new and more stringent 1972 emissions laws, although some early Dodge literature (August 1971 press) stated that this engine was available for 1972. A few (six is the accepted number) factory-installed six-pack Chargers were built, and the engine was dropped out of production by September 1971. The optional Pistol-Grip 4-speed Hurst manual shifter could be coupled to the 340, 400, and 440 Magnum engines. The Ramcharger hood scoop was discontinued, and there were optional lower-geared performance rear axle ratios and extra heavy-duty suspensions. It was also the final year for the Dana 60 differential, which was available only in combination with the 440/4 speed, heavy-duty suspension, and the 3.54:1 rear axle ratio.

The only remaining "Hi-Impact" color choices were "Hemi Orange" (EV2) and "Top Banana" (FY1), the latter was available under different names through 1974.

=== 1973 ===
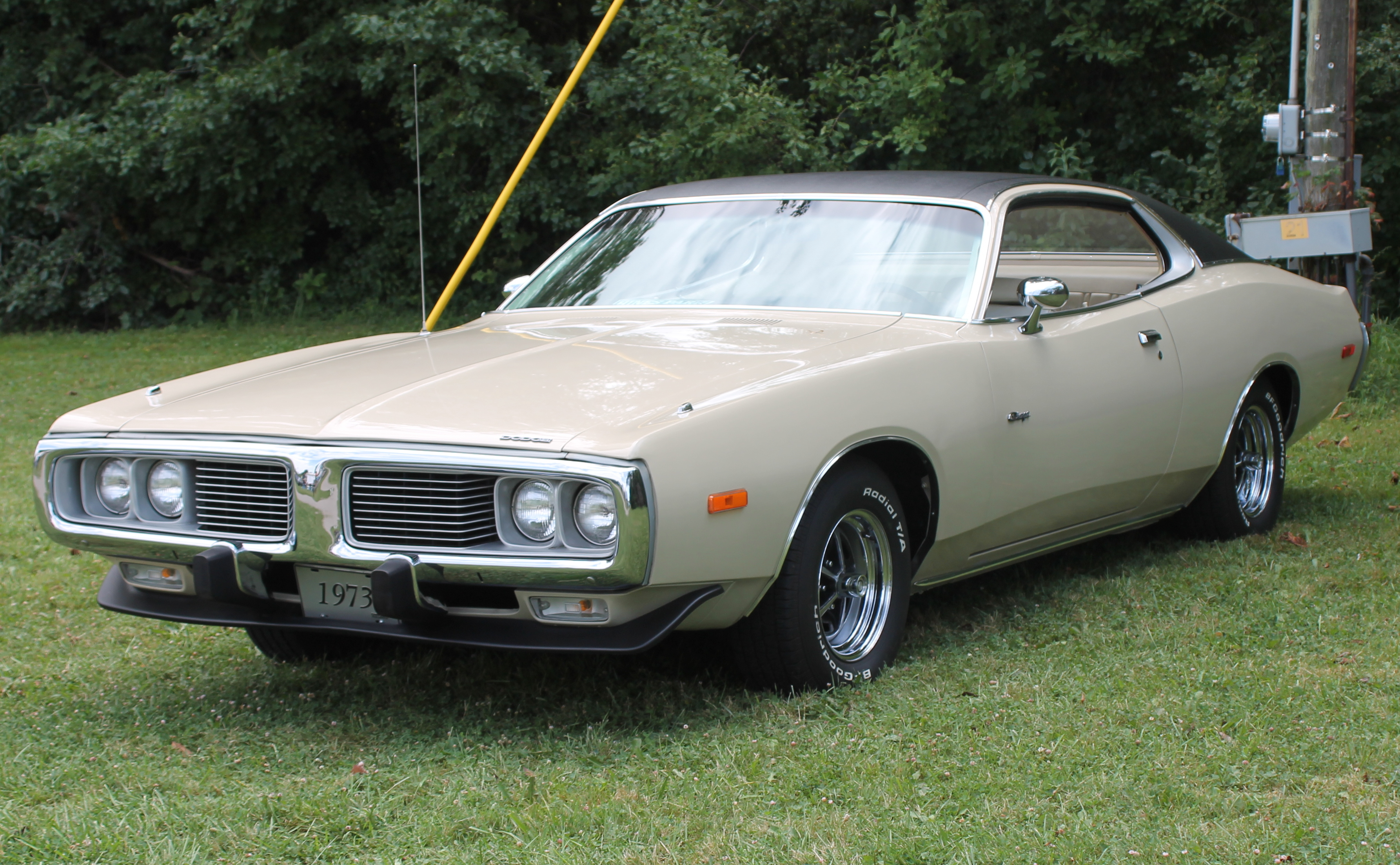
1973 Charger

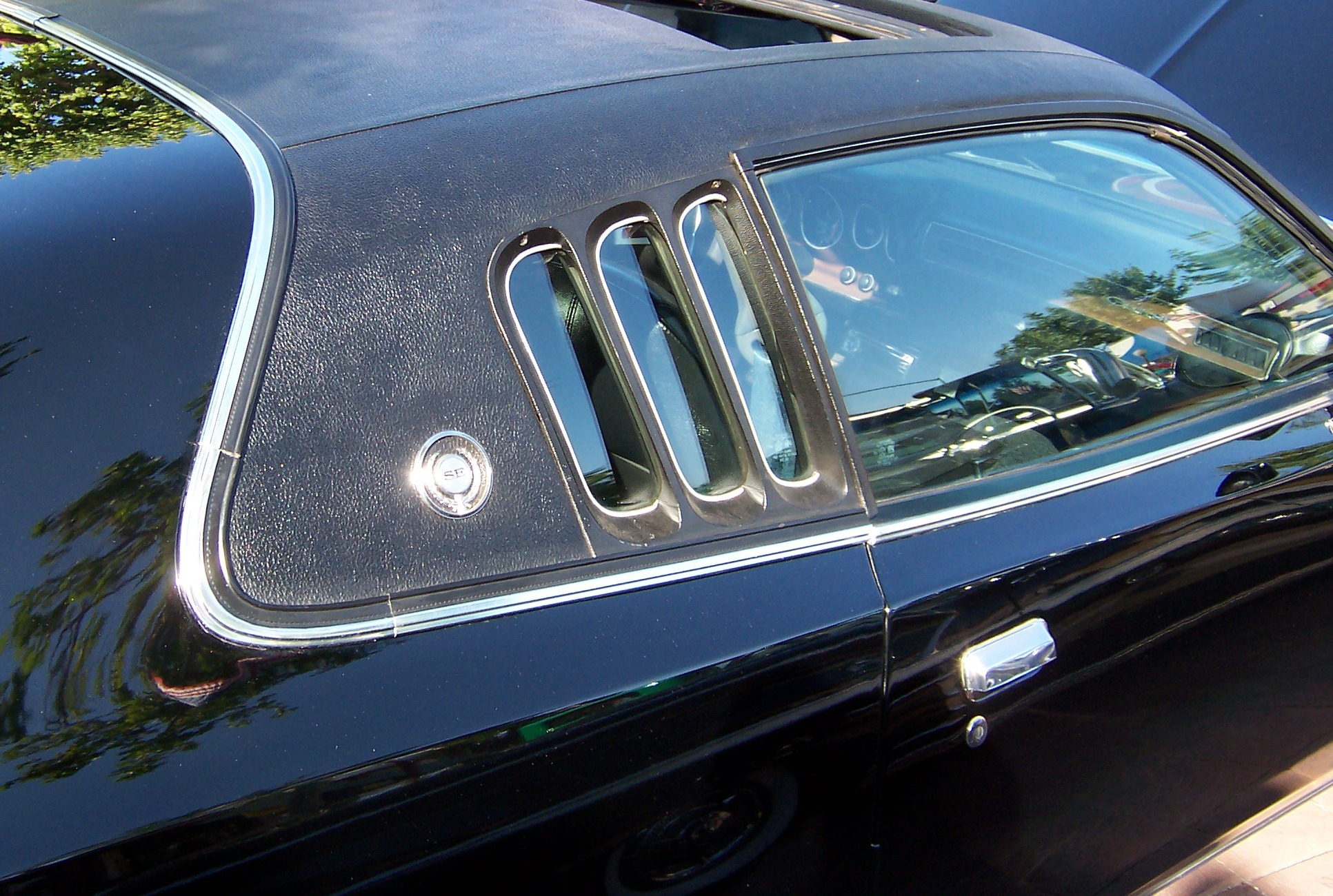
Triple quarter window on a 1973 Charger SE

For the 1973 model year, Chargers received new sheet metal and were longer, wider, and slightly taller than the 1971-72 cars. Also new were vertically slatted taillights and new grilles. Hidden headlights were dropped, even as an option.

The 318 was still standard, with the 340 (available only on the Rallye), 360 (2-barrel only), 400 (low power 2-barrel/single exhaust and high-performance 4-barrel/dual exhaust), and 440 remaining as options.

The SE models had a new roof treatment that had a "triple opera window" surrounded by a canopy-style vinyl roof. All other models had a new quarter window treatment, discontinuing its AMC Gremlin-style window in favor of a more conventional design.

Total sales this year were around 108,000 units, the highest ever for the 1971-74 Charger generation, though more than 60 percent of the cars had non-high performance engines. The 1973 Chargers, and all Chrysler products, were equipped with 5 mph bumpers, front and rear.

=== 1974 ===
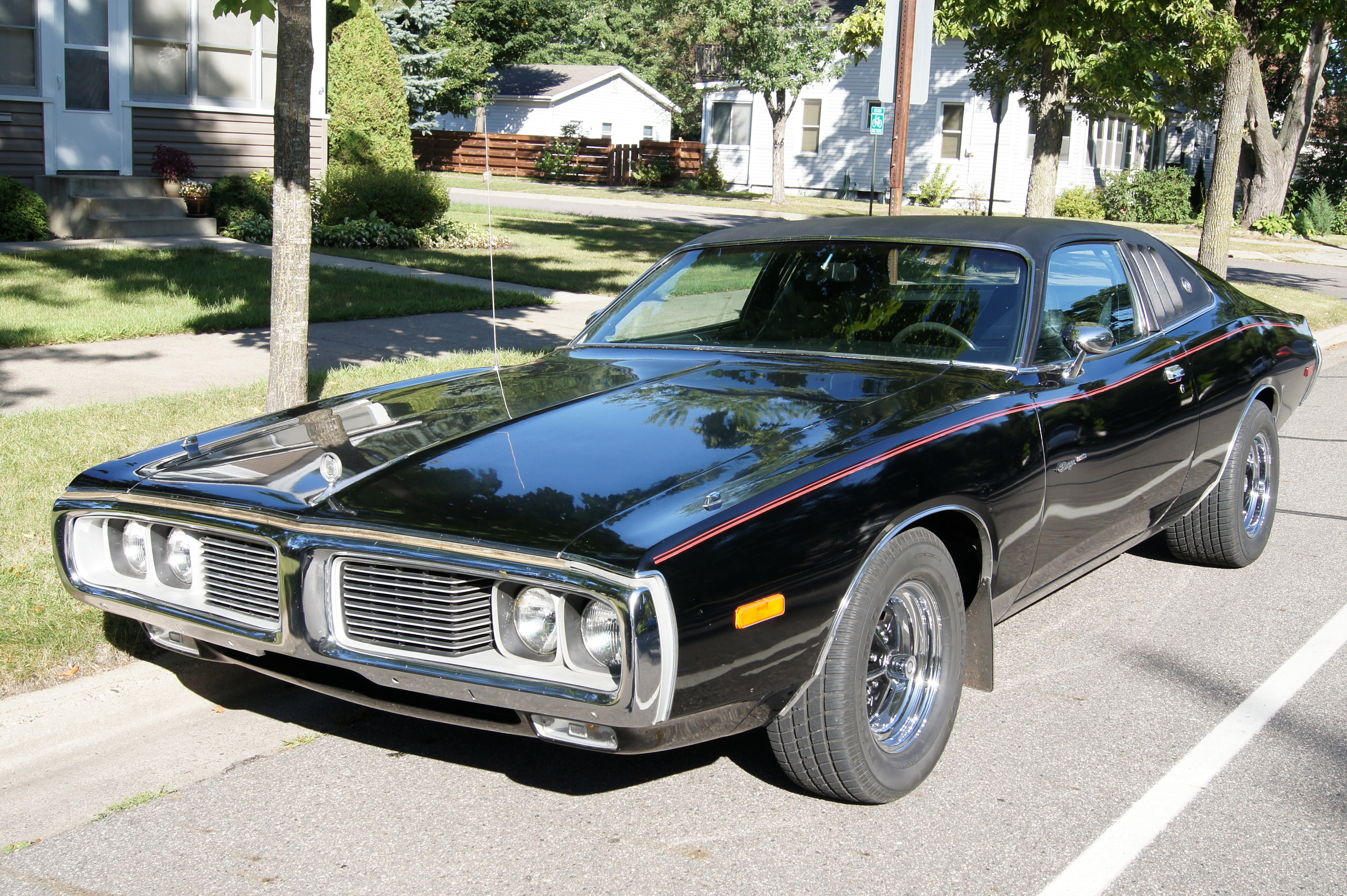
1974 Charger

The 1974 model year saw minor changes that included new color choices, a softer grain pattern on interior surfaces, and a slight increase in the size of the rubber bumper tips. The 340 option was replaced with a 360 4-bbl as the small-block performance engine. All other engine options remained the same, including the 360 2-bbl designated by a K in the fifth symbol in the vehicle identification number. Several performance rear-end ratios were available, including a 3.23 "Sure Grip" rear end. A four-speed transmission was an option except with the 440 engine.

Despite the Charger no longer being perceived as a performance model, sales rose as it veered towards being a personal luxury car. The muscle-car era ended, with 1974 as the final year for performance options.

=== NASCAR ===
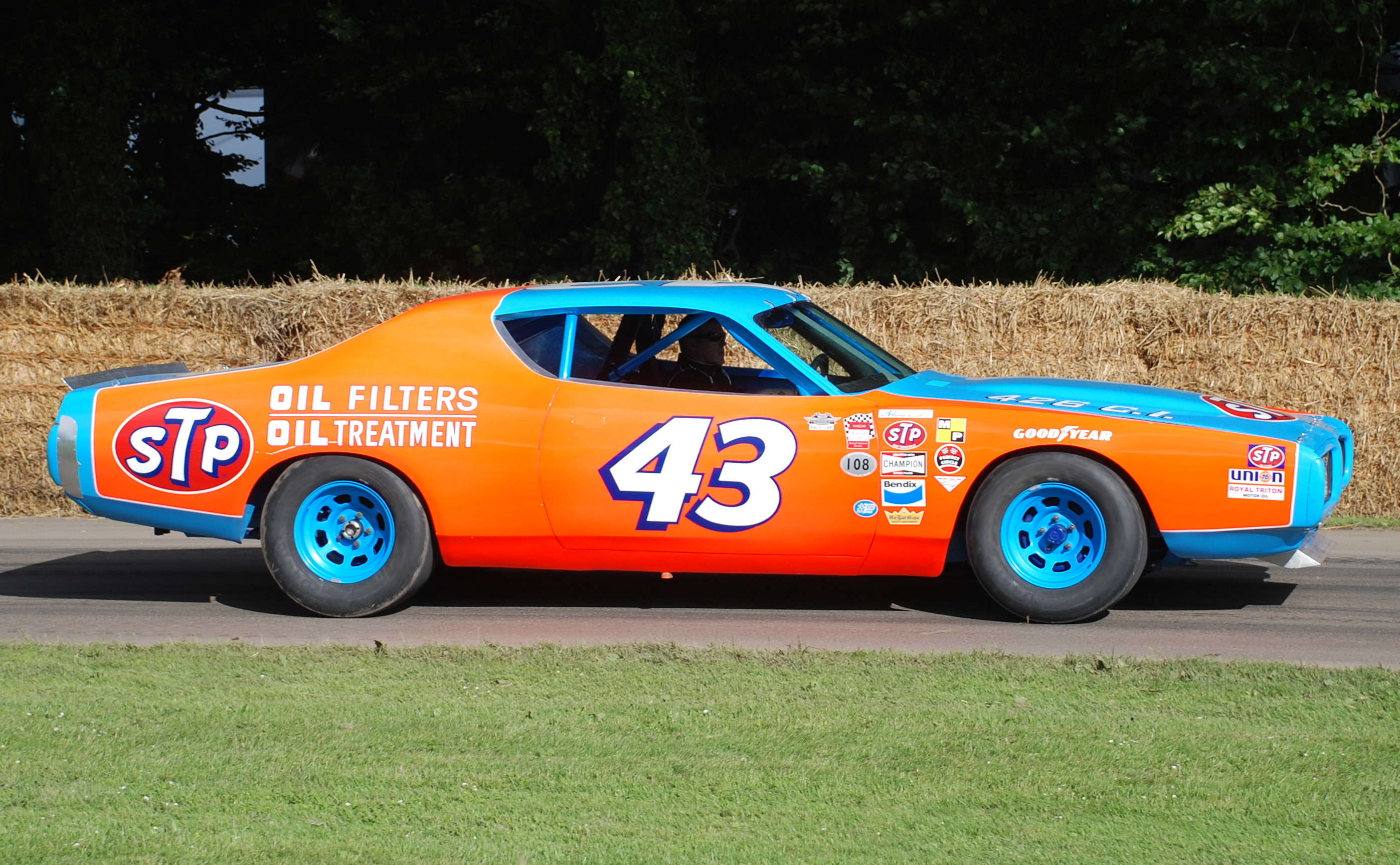
Richard Petty #43 Dodge Charger

The 1971-74 Charger based cars were campaigned in NASCAR, with Buddy Baker, Bobby Isaac, Dave Marcis, and Richard Petty scoring several wins. Richard Petty won 35 races with this body style between 1972 and 1977, when NASCAR allowed the Chargers to run a few years longer than normal because Chrysler did not have a replacement car. A 1974-bodied Charger driven by Neil Bonnett scored Dodge's last NASCAR victory (until 2001) at the December 1977 Los Angeles Times 500. Richard Petty proclaimed this body style as his favorite car, which he ran during his career because it was balanced.

== Fourth generation ==
Fourth generation
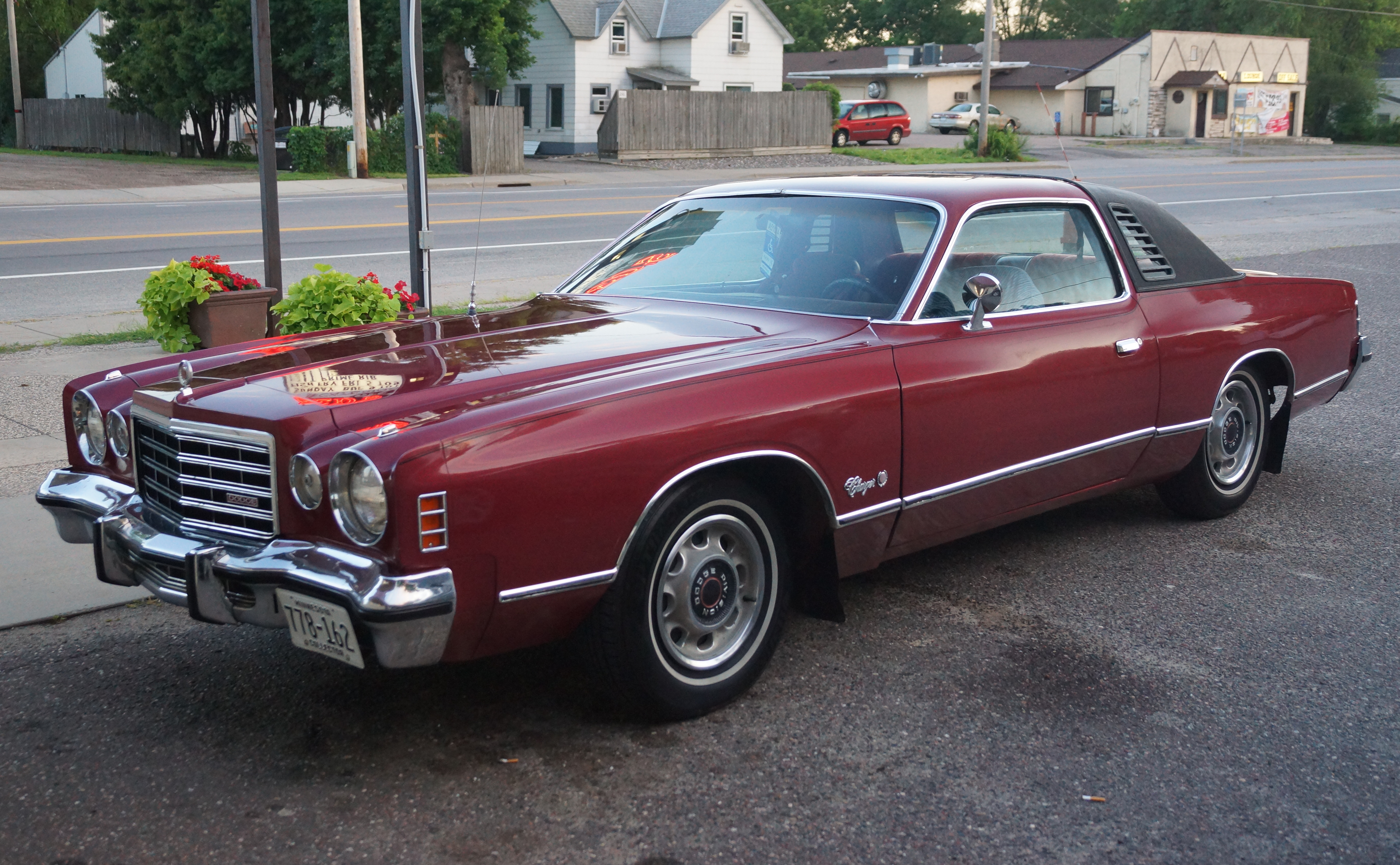
- 1975 Dodge Charger

Overview
- Model years: 1975–1978
- Assembly: United States: Detroit, Michigan; Hamtramck, Michigan; St. Louis, Missouri; Canada: Windsor, Ontario

Body and chassis
- Body style: 2-door coupe 2-door hardtop/coupe (1976 Sport 2-door model only, also refer to the 1975 Dodge Coronet 2-door model)
- Related: Dodge Coronet; Chrysler Cordoba; Plymouth GTX; Plymouth Fury

Powertrain
- Engine: 318 cu in (5.2 L) V8; 360 cu in (5.9 L) V8; 400 cu in (6.6 L) V8
- Transmission: 3-speed automatic 3-speed manual 4-speed manual

Dimensions
- Wheelbase: 115.0 in (2,921 mm)
- Length: 216.0 in (5,486 mm)
- Height: 52.0 in (1,321 mm)

=== 1975 ===
The 1975 model year Charger picked up on the sales increase seen in 1974's move towards positioning it as a personal luxury car. Both the Charger and the new Chrysler Cordoba sibling shared the same body based on the B platform.

The Charger SE (Special Edition) was the only model offered. It was available with the 318 cu in (5.2 L) "LA" series small block V8 and three versions of 400 cu in (6.6 L) big-block V8. The standard engine was the 360 cu in (5.9 L) 2-bbl small block. The code E58 4-bbl and dual exhaust high-performance version (225 hp) were optional. Sales in 1975 totaled 30,812.

Because of the extreme squareness of the body design, NASCAR teams were forced to rely on the previous year's (1974) sheet metal for race-spec cars. For Dodge to be represented, NASCAR allowed the 1974 sheet metal to be used until January 1978, when the new Dodge Magnum was ready for race use. In 1976, a Charger was one of two NASCAR stock cars to compete in the 24 Hours of Le Mans, having been modified with head-lamps, tail-lamps, and windshield wipers. It was driven by Herschel and Doug McGriff and sponsored by Olympia Beer, earning the nickname "Oly Express"

=== 1976 ===
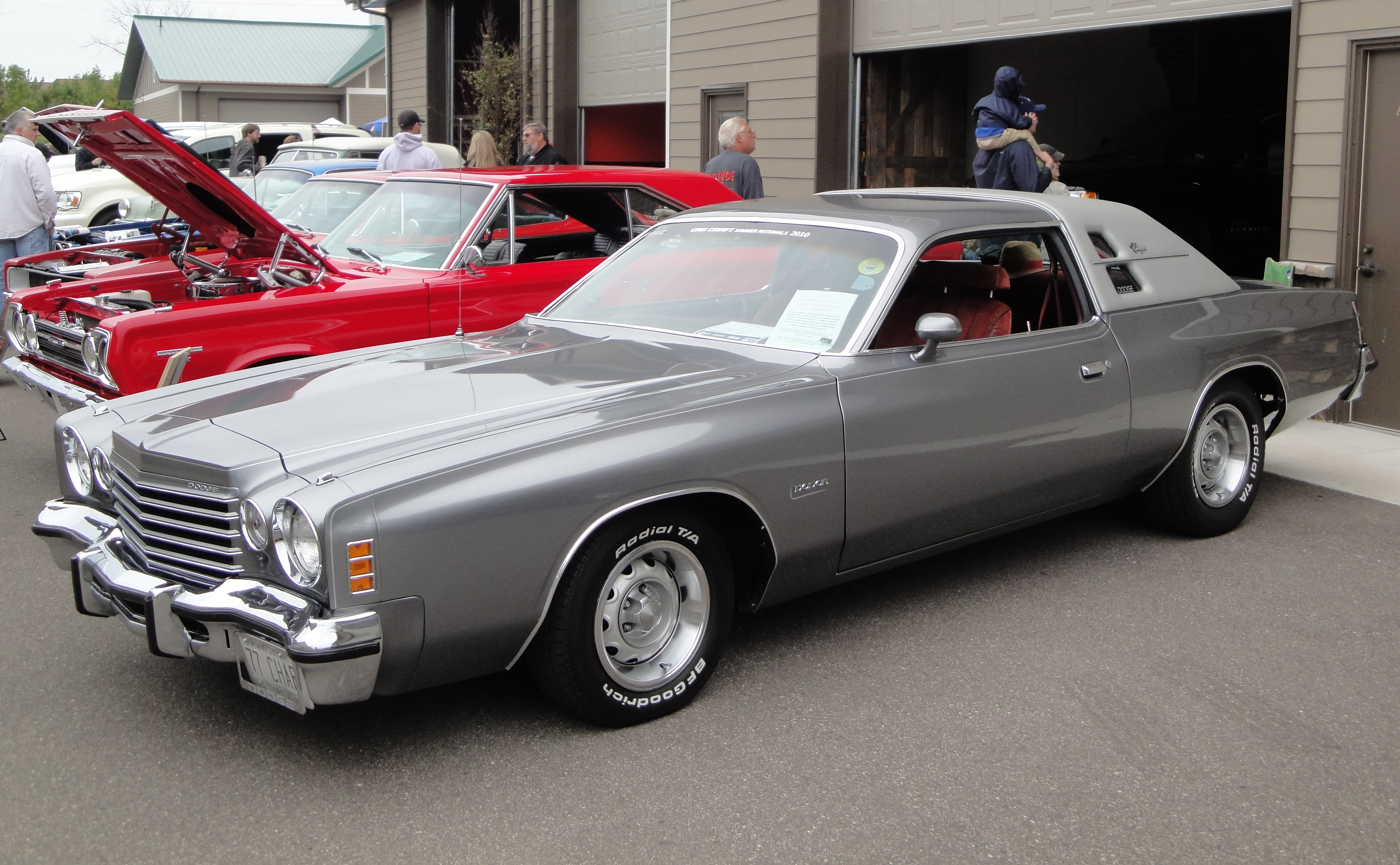

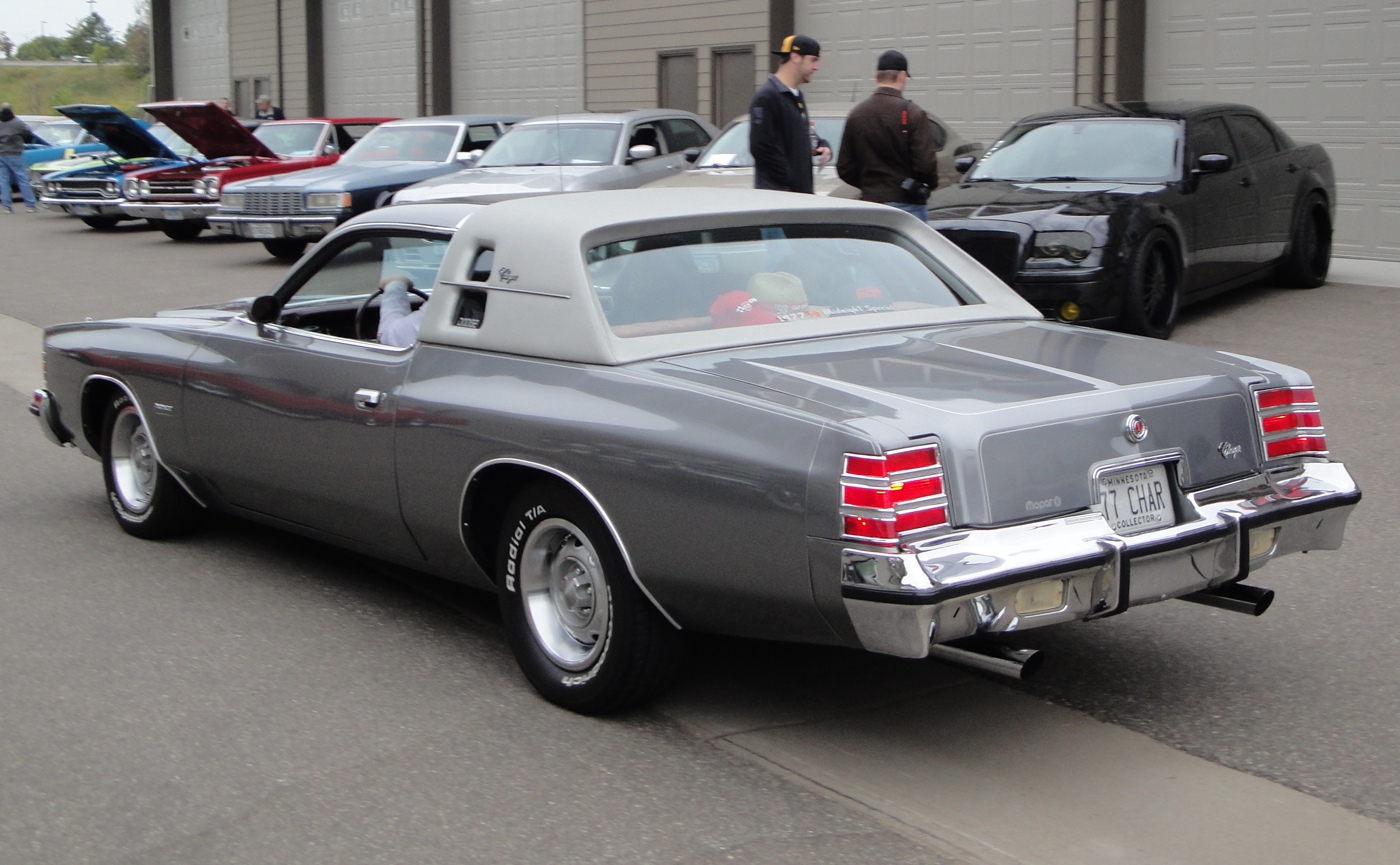
1977 Dodge Charger Midnight Edition

The 1976 model year Charger range was expanded to four models: the base, Charger Sport (formerly the Dodge Coronet 2-door model, which appeared for just the previous model year only), Charger SE, and the Charger Daytona. The base and Sport models used a body different from the SE and Daytona. They were essentially a re-badging of what had been the 1975 Dodge Coronet 2-door models – and available with a 225 cu in (3.7 L) Slant Six, which was not offered on the SE and Daytona. The Charger Daytona was introduced as an appearance package with a 360 or 400 engine. Sales for 1976 increased slightly to 65,900 units.

=== 1977 ===
In 1977, the Charger Sport (which dated back to the former Coronet 2-door, which had appeared for only the 1975 model year) and the base Charger were dropped as this body style became part of the newly named B-body Monaco line, and only the Charger SE and Charger Daytona were offered. Estimated production was 30,367 units.

=== 1978 ===
The 1978 model year was a carry-over and the final use of the B-Body. A total of 2,735 Chargers were produced.

The Magnum replaced the Charger as Dodge's B-body personal luxury car, and its sales increased.
