= DT-20 =

Soviet tractor

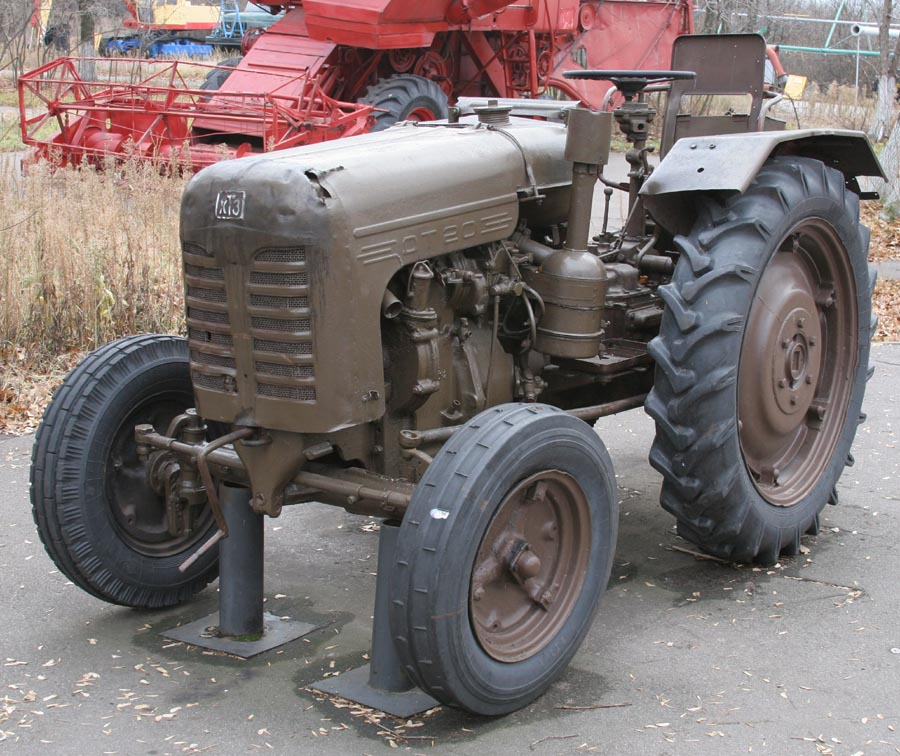
A D–20 model exhibited in Saratov.

DT–20 is a Soviet tractor with rubber wheels. It had 6kN pulling force. 248,400 pieces were produced from 1958 to 1969 in Kharkiv. Its main aim was the usage in the gardening and in orchards.

Plans of DT-20 were based on the DT-14B’s structure, but it had more power. It can handle trucked and mounted devices as well. It had five variants, each with a dedicated purpose, with variant gages and with little modifications.

It is a 15 tractor with an angular suspension. It has no hydraulic system. There is built to the system a D-20 diesel engine which has a 13.2 kW power. Its transmission has six onwards and five backwards scales. Its maximum speed varied between 5 and 17.6 km/h high speed.

== Sources ==
- B. F. Koszenko, B. P. Tyurkin: Traktori (Szpravocsnaja knyiga), Lenyizdat, 1968, p. 146.
