= Traction component =

Type of vehicular transducer

A traction component in a vehicular sense, is a type of transducer.
