= Subaru Impreza =

Model of compact car

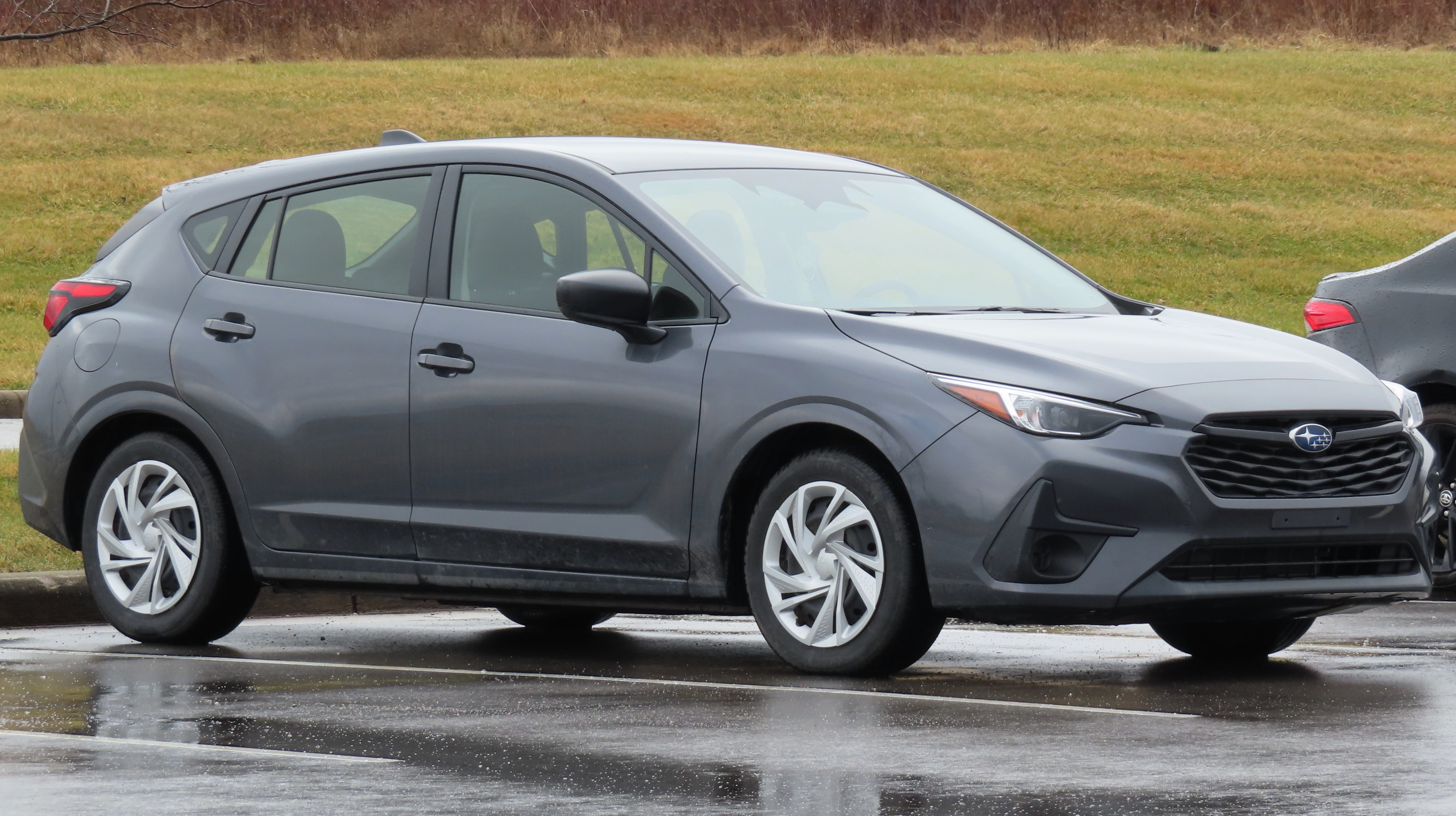
- 2024 Subaru Impreza hatchback (GU)

Overview
- Manufacturer: Subaru
- Production: 1992–present

Body and chassis
- Class: Compact car
- Body style: 2-door coupe (1992–2000); 4-door sedan (1992–2023); 5-door hatchback (2007–present); 5-door station wagon (1992–2007)
- Layout: Front-engine, front-wheel drive (1992–present, JDM); Front-engine, all-wheel drive (1992–present)

Chronology
- Predecessor: Subaru Leone
- Successor: Subaru WRX (for Impreza WRX and Impreza WRX STI models); Subaru Crosstrek (for Impreza RV, XV and Outback Sport models); Subaru Levorg (for Impreza station wagon models)

The Subaru Impreza (Japanese: スバル・インプレッサ, Hepburn: Subaru Inpuressa) is a compact car that has been manufactured by the Japanese automaker Subaru since 1992. It was introduced as a replacement for the Leone, with the predecessor's EA series engines replaced by the new EJ series. It is now in its sixth generation.

Subaru has offered a 5-door hatchback body variant since 2008. The firm also offered a coupe from 1995 until 2001, a 4-door sedan up to the fifth generation, and a 5-door wagon from the Impreza's introduction which was replaced by a hatchback with the third generation in 2008. Mainstream versions have received "boxer" flat-four engines ranging from 1.5- to 2.5-liters, with the performance-oriented Impreza WRX and WRX STI models upgraded with the addition of turbochargers. Since the third-generation series, some markets have adopted the abbreviated Subaru WRX name for these high-performance variants. The first three generations of Impreza were also available with an off-road appearance non-SUV package called the Outback Sport, exclusive to the North American market. For the fourth generation, this appearance package was raised up to be subcompact crossover SUV and renamed the XV (Crosstrek in North America), and is sold internationally. Colloquially, the car is sometimes referred to as Scooby.

Subaru has offered front- and all-wheel drive layouts for the Impreza. Since the late 1990s, some markets have restricted sales to the all-wheel drive model, putting the Impreza in a unique selling proposition in the global compact class, which is usually characterized by front-wheel drive or FWD in short. Japanese models remain available in both configurations.

A 2019 iSeeCars study named the Impreza as the lowest-depreciating sedan in the United States after five years.

== First generation (GM, GC, GF; 1992) ==
First generation
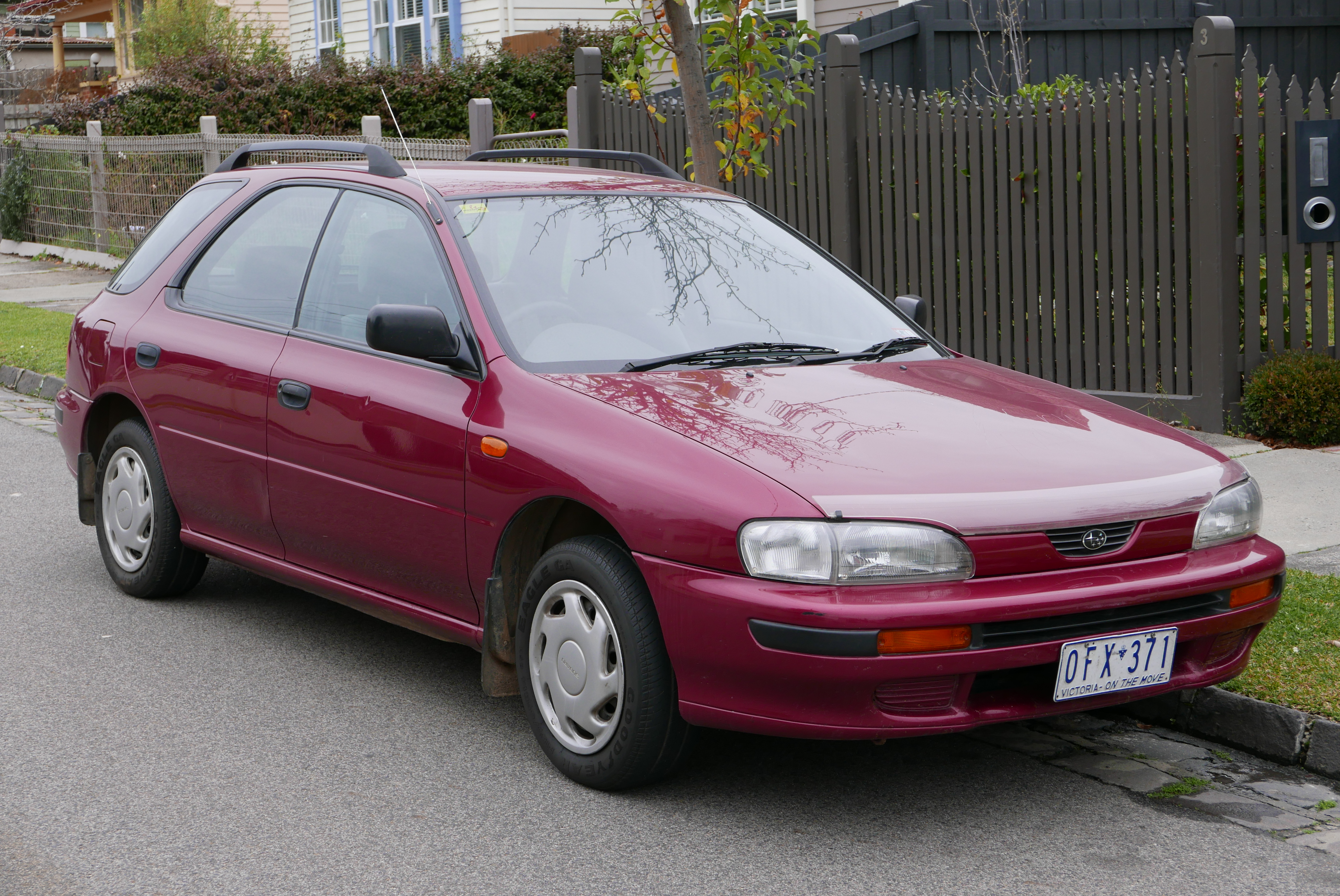
- 1994 Subaru Impreza Wagon (pre-facelift)

Overview
- Model code: GC (sedan); GF (estate); GM (coupe)
- Also called: Subaru Outback Sport (1997–2001); Subaru Grand Leone (Israel, 1992–1996); Subaru Sportswagon; Subaru Impreza Gravel Express (Japan, 1995–1996); Subaru Impreza Casa Blanca (1999–2000)
- Production: October 1992–2000
- Model years: 1994–2001 (North America)
- Assembly: Japan: Ōta, Gunma; Taiwan: Pingtung City (TCMC; CKD)
- Designer: Hidefumi Kato (1990)

Body and chassis
- Body style: 2-door coupe 4-door sedan 5-door estate

Powertrain
- Engine: Gasoline: 1.5 L EJ15 H4; 1.6 L EJ16 H4; 1.8 L EJ18 H4; 2.0 L EJ20 H4; 2.0 L EJ20 turbo H4; 2.2 L EJ22 H4; 2.2 L EJ22G turbo H4 (22B STI); 2.5 L EJ25 H4
- Transmission: 5-speed manual; 4-speed automatic

Dimensions
- Wheelbase: 2,520 mm (99.2 in)
- Length: 4,340 mm (170.9 in)
- Width: 1,690 mm (66.5 in)
- Height: 1,405 mm (55.3 in)
- Curb weight: 1,220 kg (2,689.6 lb)

Pre-facelift

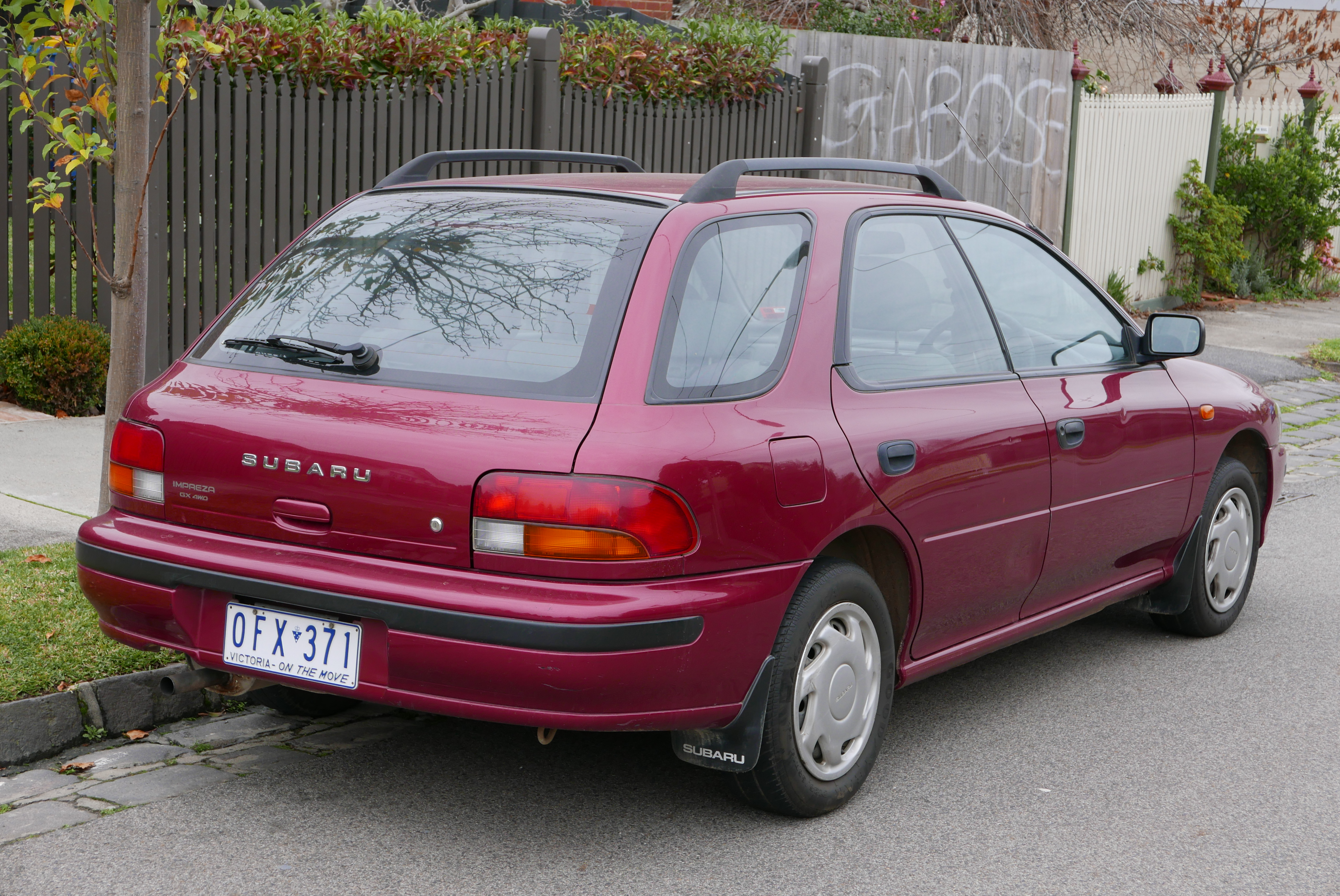
Wagon

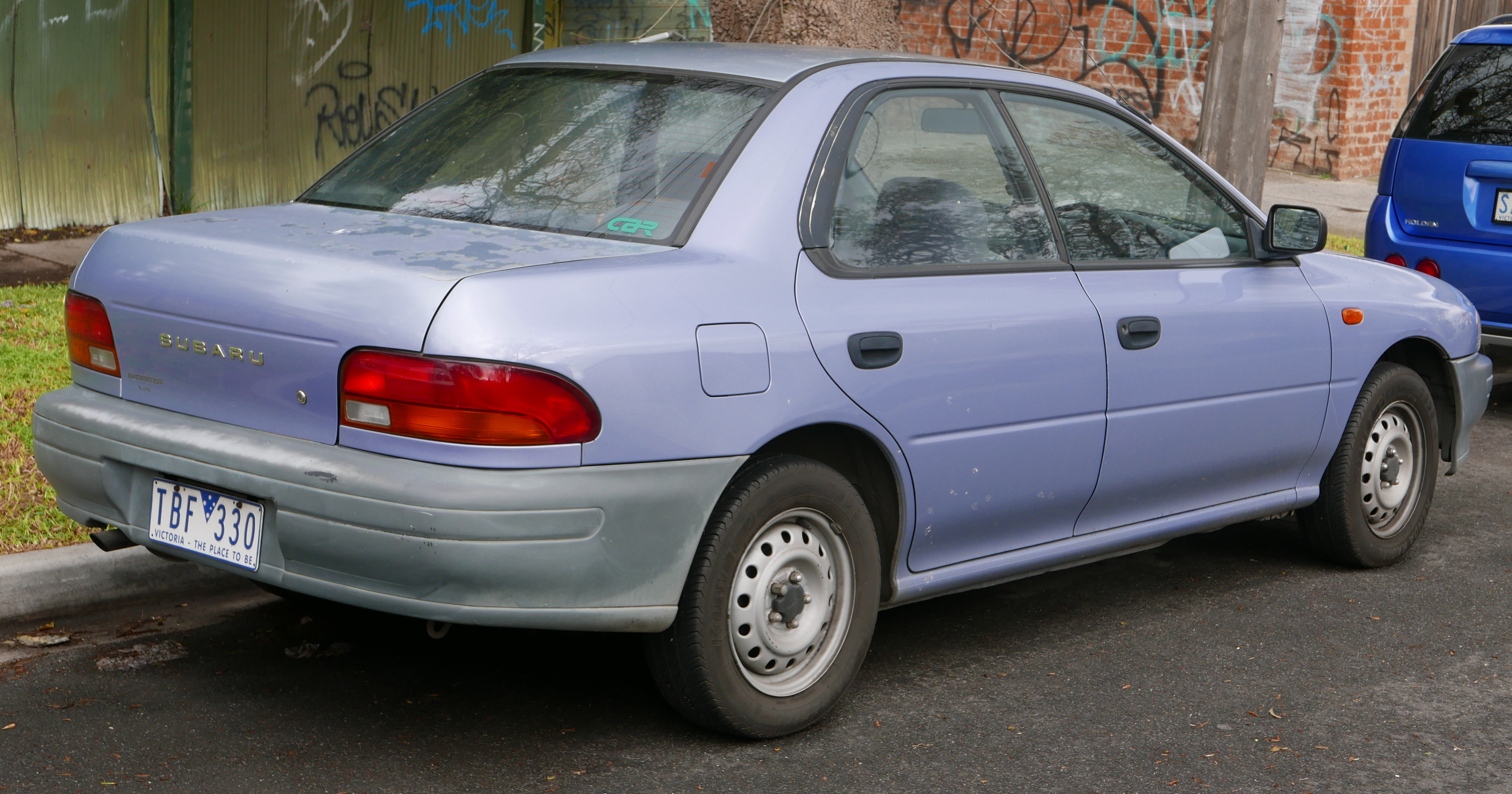
Sedan

Announced on 22 October 1992, the Impreza was released in Japan in November and offered in either front-wheel drive (FWD) or all-wheel drive (AWD) versions and as a four-door sedan or five-door wagon (Touring). The car used a shortened version of the Legacy's floor pan. According to a Motor Trend article written March 1992 on page 26, the name of Subaru's new compact was, initially, to be called the Loyale, displaying an official photograph of the four-door sedan. In late 1995, a two-door coupe was introduced. In Japan it was called Impreza Retna. Initial engine choices included 1.5, 1.6, 1.8, and 2.0-liter naturally aspirated engines.

Subaru chose to continue their longstanding use of the boxer engine in the Impreza. According to Subaru, their configuration of the engine inline with the transmission minimizes body roll due to the lower center of gravity compared with offset engines in most other vehicles. The boxer design provides good vibration mitigation due to the principles of a balanced engine because the movement of each piston is largely countered by a piston in the opposing cylinder bank, eliminating the need for a counter-weighted rotating crankshaft (harmonic balancer), but with some vibration from offsets. Torque steer is also reduced with this type of powertrain layout since the front drive shafts are of equal length and weight.

At the time of introduction, the Japanese and European market naturally aspirated models (1.6 and 1.8) received an unusual grille with a small central opening. Only the WRX and regular North American models received a conventional "full" grille until the 1994 facelift, when the regular models' appearance was brought in line with that of the sporting models.

First facelift
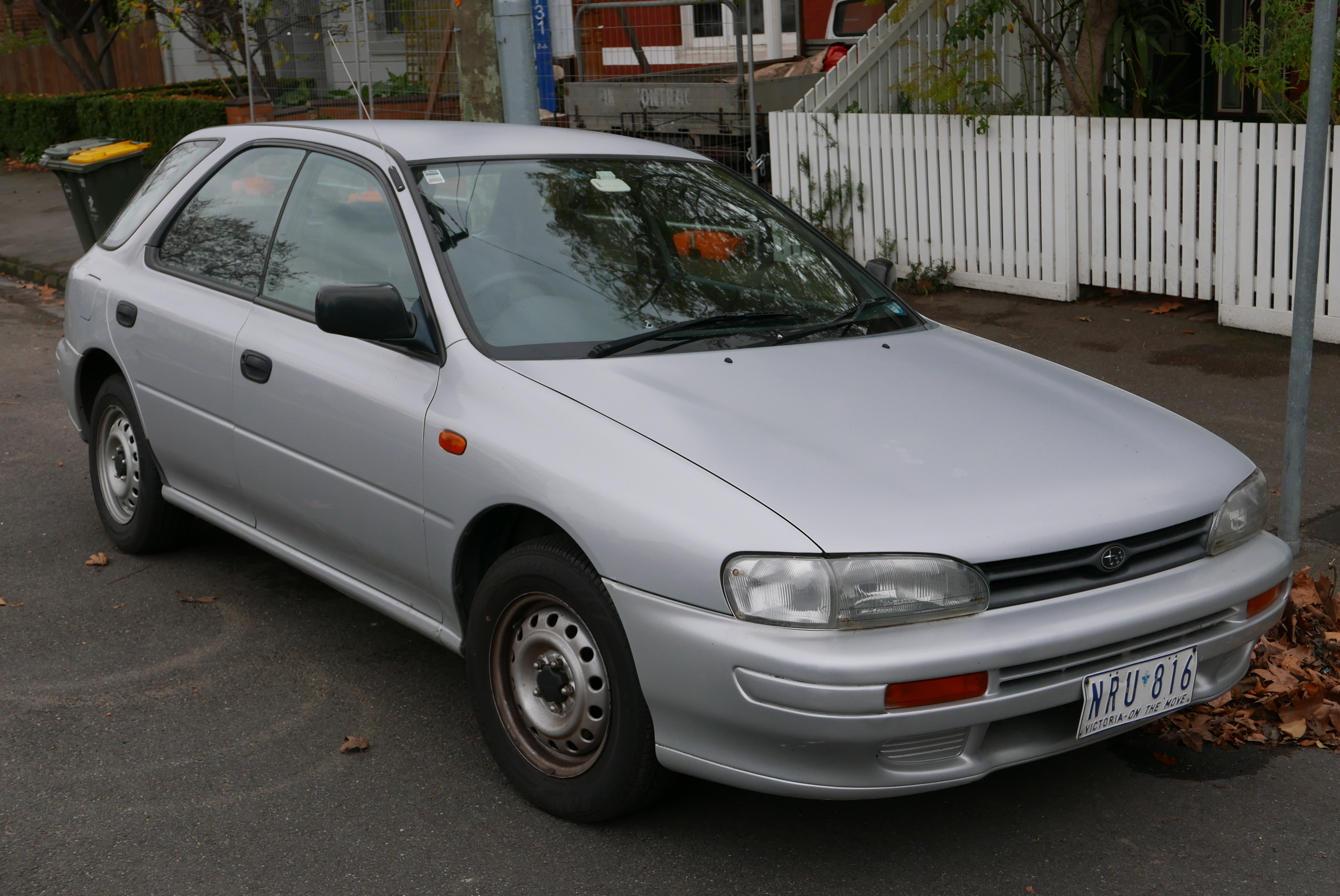

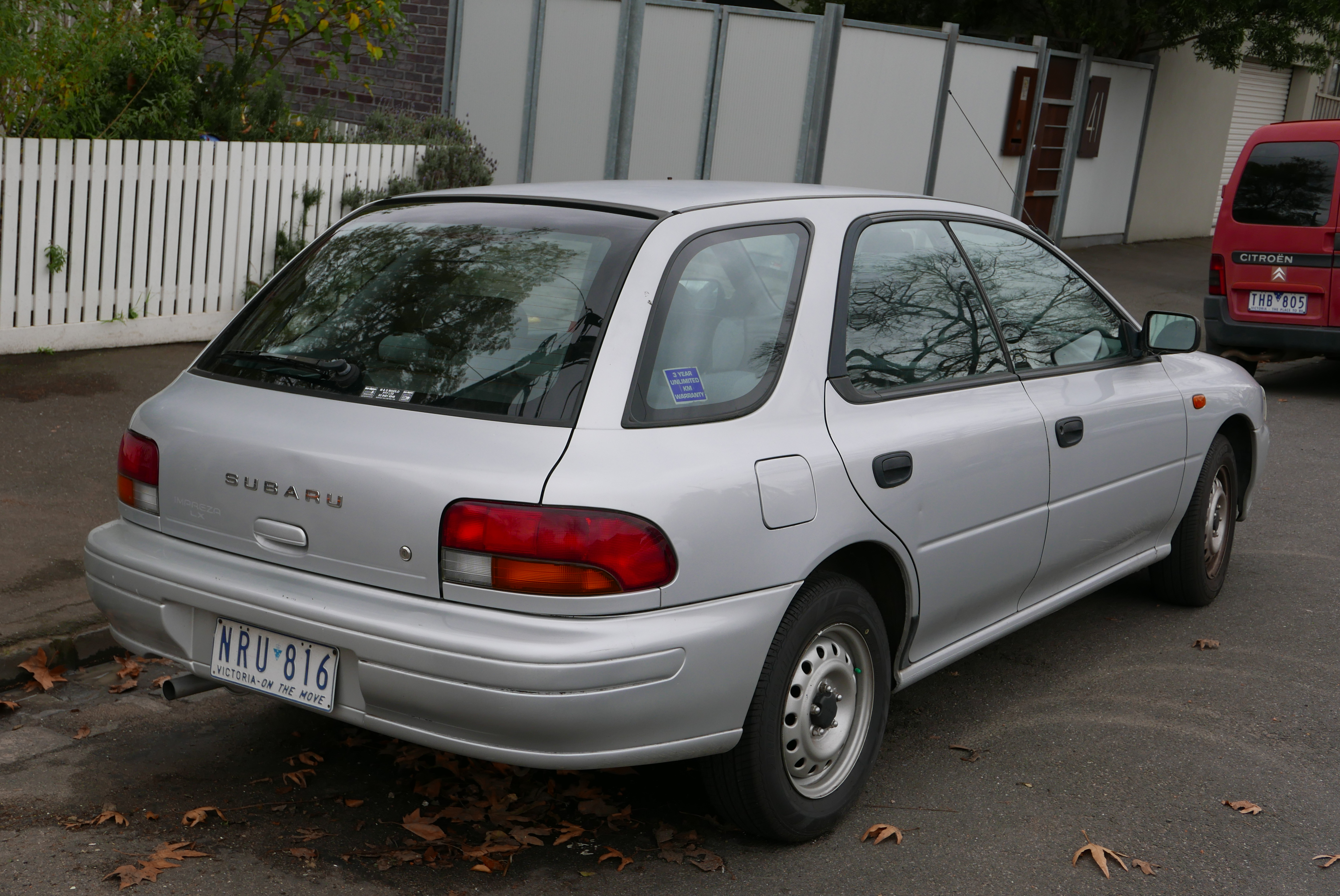
Wagon

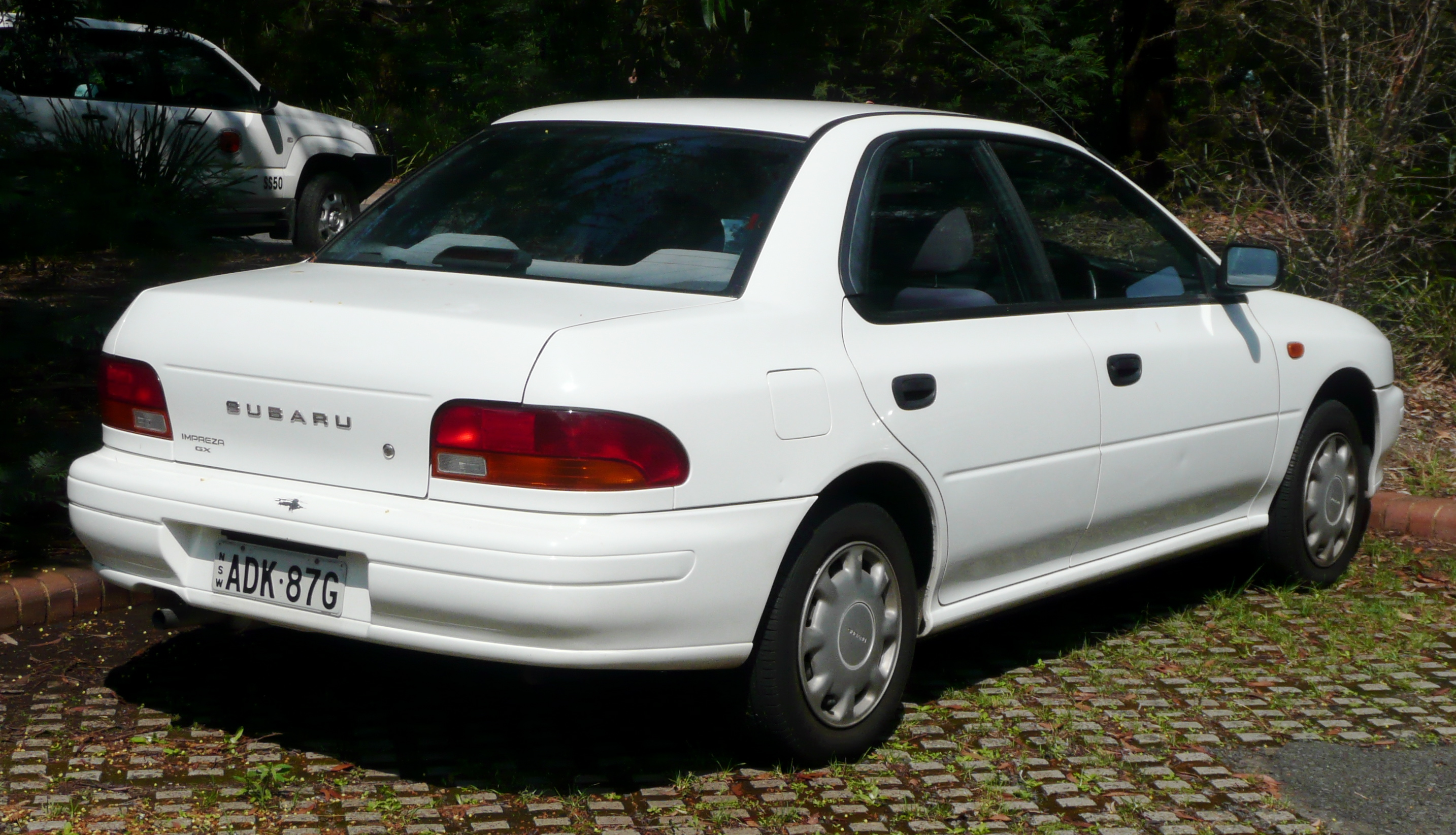
Sedan

The Outback Sport was introduced to North America in 1994 for the 1995 model year as an updated Impreza "L" Sports Wagon. It was the top trim level of the Impreza wagon model with no significant mechanical or performance changes from the lower trim levels aside from a slightly lifted suspension. Subaru found some sales success with the Outback Sport as a smaller companion with similar ride height changes, body colors and trim levels to the larger, more successful selling Legacy-based Outback. For the first time, the 2.2-liter engine was used in the American Impreza. Later, the 2.5-liter engine was introduced. In Japan, the Impreza WRX Sports Wagon was offered with a similar approach to the Outback Sport, calling it the "Impreza Gravel Express". Subaru discontinued the Gravel Express when the second-generation Impreza was introduced due to very limited sales. The hood-scoop found on the American Outback Sport was non-functional but was probably included because the American and Japanese versions were built at the same factory in Japan. The Outback Sport was offered with optional equipment, such as a gauge pack installed on top of the dashboard, that included a digital compass, outside temperature and barometer or altimeter readings.

Trim levels were LX, GL and Sport generation. LX models were front-wheel drive, and powered by a 1.6-liter engine. GL trim levels were either front-wheel drive (Subaru badged these 2WD) or all-wheel-drive (badged AWD); cars launched in 1993 had a choice of 1.6- and 1.8-liter flat-4 engines, the 1.6 being available with 2WD, the 1.8 an AWD version only. From 1996, the 1.8-liter versions were dropped (in the European market), and replaced by a 2.0-liter engine. Sport versions had alloy wheels, and a 2.0-liter engine only.

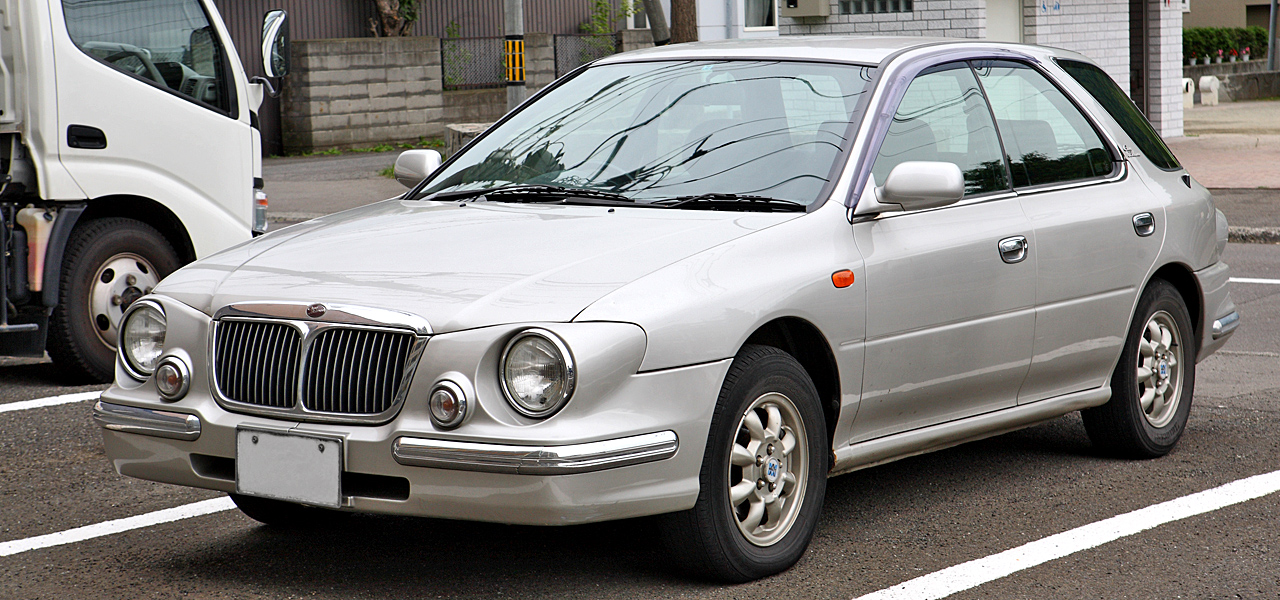
Subaru Impreza Casa Blanca

During this generation, Subaru offered a limited edition Impreza Sports Wagon called the Casa Blanca, which had a retro-inspired front and rear end treatment, which was inspired by the popular kei car Subaru Vivio Bistro styling package and Subaru Sambar Dias Classic. However, the styling was controversial and the sales were very low. Even though the run was limited to 5,000 units and it was considered a rare find, depreciation values were very low and was a very niche car.

The Impreza received an external facelift for the 1997 model year, followed by an interior redesign in 1998, using the new redesigned dashboard from the Forester.

Second facelift
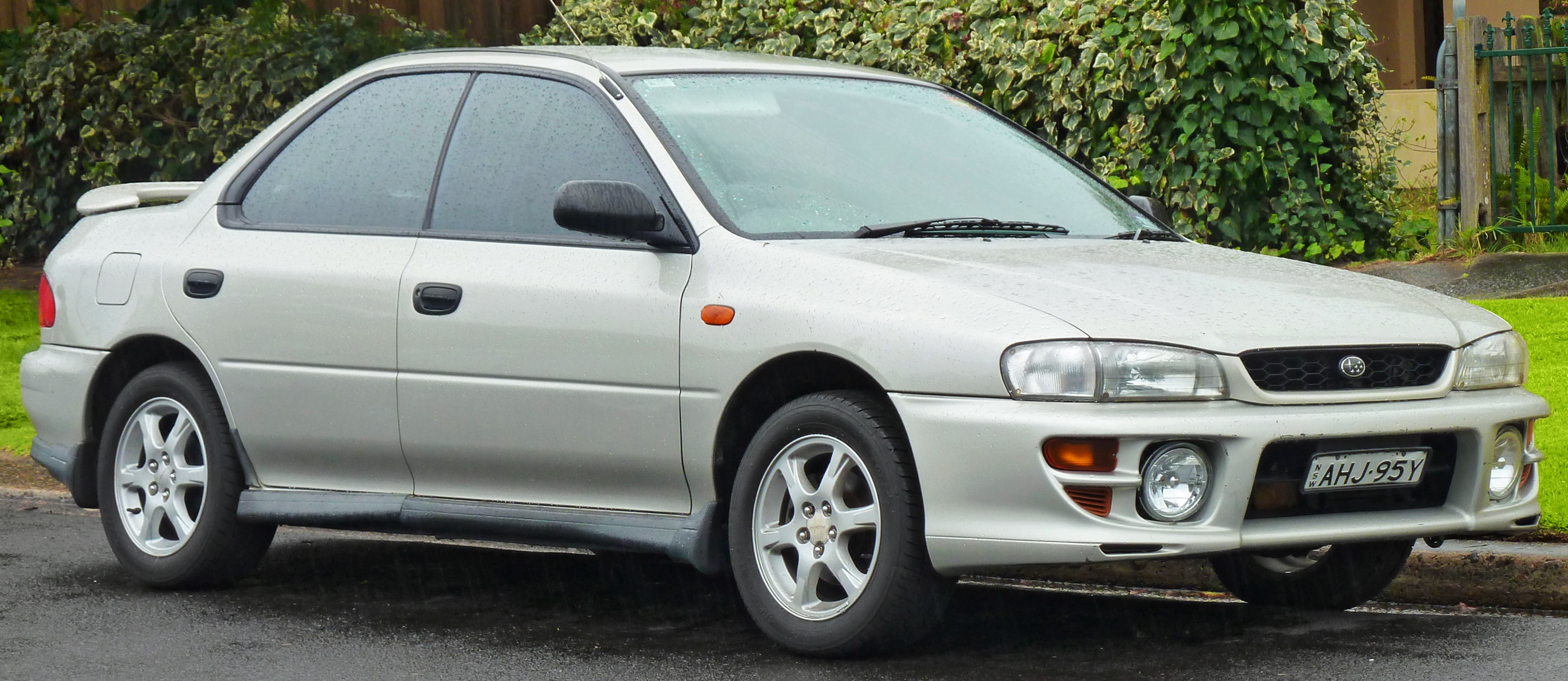

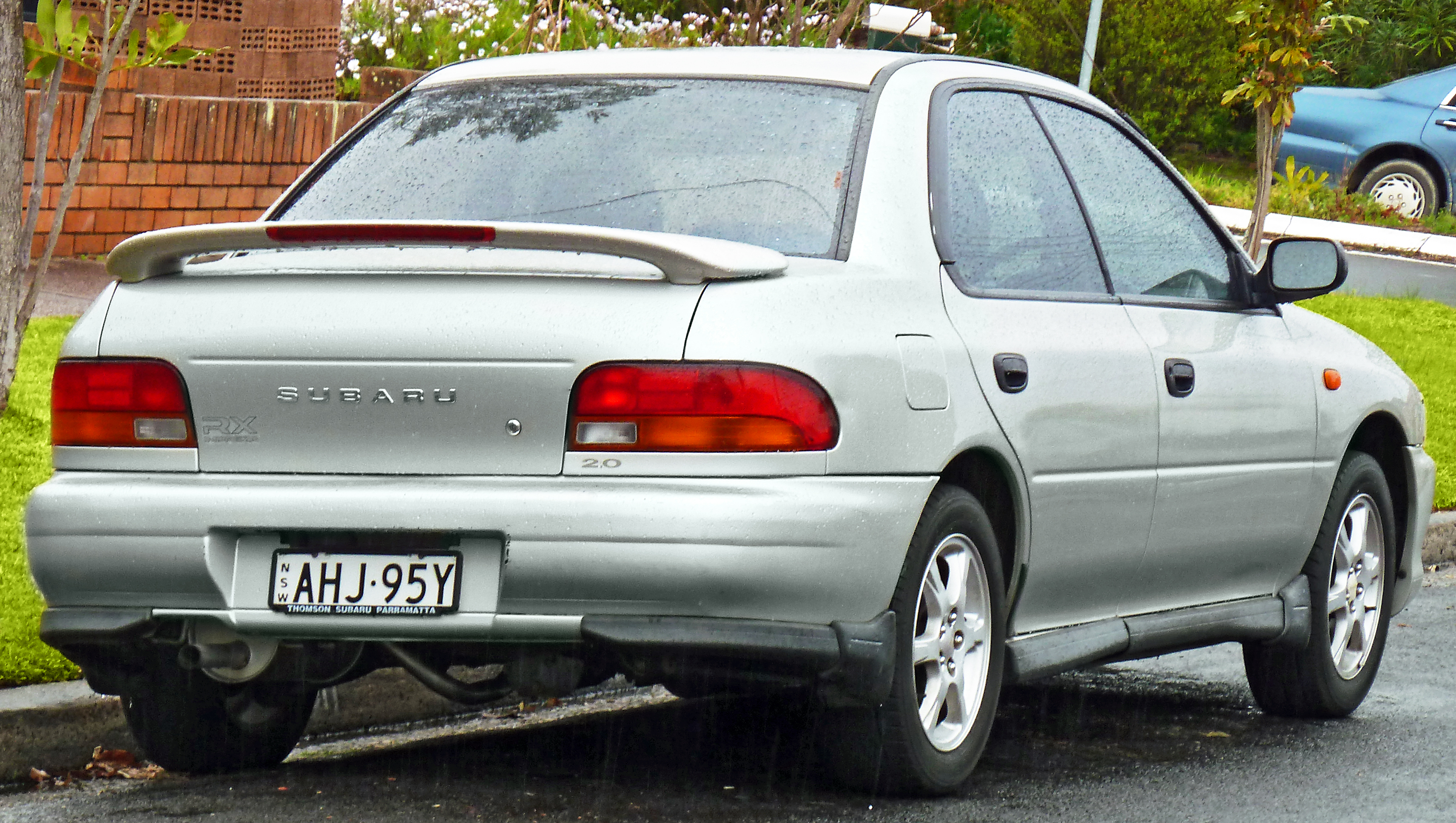
Sedan

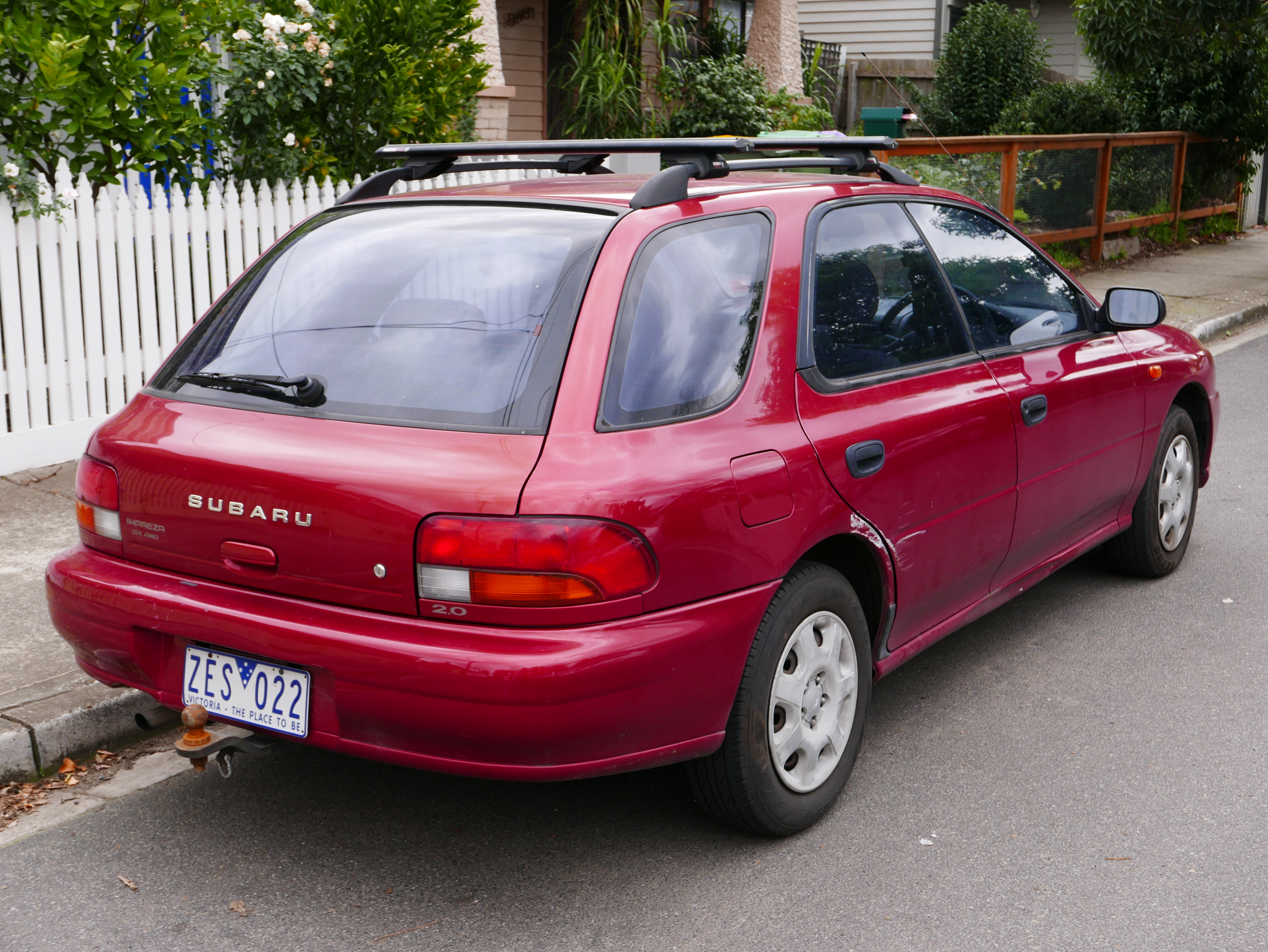
Hatchback/wagon

Subaru of North America initially offered the Impreza with the 1.8-liter engine only, with either front- or all-wheel drive; a 2.2-liter engine became optional for 1995. For the 1995 model year, the 1.8/EJ18 was available with a 5-speed manual or a 4-speed automatic transmission on the 'base' model only. The 2.2/EJ22 was only available with an automatic transmission for the L, LX, and Outback Sport trims. The 1995 model year also introduced OBD-II (On-Board Diagnostics version 2) in the EJ22/Automatic transmission equipped models. The 1996 model line-up replaced the base version with the low-content Brighton trim, also used in the Legacy model. A five-speed manual transmission became available with the 2.2 engine on all models, except the Brighton which was only available with the 1.8 and a 5-speed.

Subaru later decided to emphasize all-wheel drive in North America, making it standard on every Impreza (and Legacy) from 1997 onwards. North American markets never received the WRX version of the first-generation Impreza. To test the waters for a full-fledged turbocharged model, Subaru showcased a turbocharged Impreza at various car shows around the country. The vehicle was named the 2.5RX and is now located in Subaru of America's Cherry Hill, New Jersey storage facility. Subsequently, the 2.5RS performance model was introduced in 1998 (the same year the 1.8-liter engine was dropped). A naturally aspirated 2.5-liter engine and larger brakes were fitted into the coupe body with gold-colored 16-inch five-spoke alloy wheels. The 2.5RS also featured several external cues from its overseas brethren such as hood vents, a hood scoop, and a rally-inspired rear spoiler. The 2.5/EJ25D (DOHC) used in the 1998 RS suffered from a high-rate of head gasket failures. The 1999 model featured several changes: the newly designed "Phase II" SOHC version of the same 2.5-liter engine featured a slightly higher peak torque by 5 N⋅m (3.7 lb⋅ft), the wheels turned to a standard silver, the interior got an update, and the exterior became visually similar to the Japanese model with an updated front bumper borrowed from the Japanese Version 5 Impreza WRX STI. 2.5RS models became available in sedan form for 2000 along with the inclusion of viscous-type rear LSDs as standard equipment.

The G in GC/GM/GF corresponds to the production line (Impreza) while the following character is the chassis code. In the US and Canada, C denotes a sedan, M a coupe and F a wagon. Note that this is not the case for the RHD vehicles. In the case of the 2.5RS, the VIN would be either GC6 (2000 - 2001) or GM6 (1999-2001), with the 6 corresponding to the N/A SOHC EJ253 engine, specifically the engine displacement of 2.5 liters. The 1998 RS came with an N/A DOHC EJ25D.

=== WRX and STi ===
There have been seven noted versions of the WRX dating back from Subaru's original World Rally Cross staging vehicles. Subaru adopted the name "WRX" to stand for "World Rally eXperimental" as all WRX versions (1992 to present) feature rally inspired technology, including all wheel drive, stiffened suspensions and turbocharged four cylinder engines. The STi versions were the high performance models, homologated for rallying and are labeled as versions 1 through to 6. These come in three different body styles; saloon, Coupé (type R only) and estate.

Subaru introduced Subaru Tecnica International (STi) versions of the WRX in Japan starting in 1992 although the first model badged as an STi was the Version 1 in late 1993 (see below). These models were upgraded from the standard WRX in many categories, including blueprinted performance-tuned engines, transmissions, and suspensions. The STi versions of the WRX were immensely successful in rallies and popular among street racers but were only sold in the Japanese market. Compared to the WRX, the STi had mostly mechanical modifications. STi prepped Subaru rally cars since 1988 including the Legacy RS, the WRX STi Version I was just the first car badged as an STi. Model variants are known as Versions 1-6, or by Roman numeric terms.

==== GC8A (November 1992 – September 1993) ====
The WRX debuted in November 1992 with 240 PS (177 kW; 237 hp). The center differential was a viscous coupling type, the rear limited-slip differential was a viscous type. The WRX Type RA is a stripped-down version of the WRX that was available in the Japanese market for people to purchase for motorsports. Targeted for race and rally, the RA versions were generally lighter in weight; featuring reduced soundproofing, manual windows, car horn delete, no air conditioning, no anti-lock brakes, and added racing features such as more robust engines, fifth injection, intercooler water spray and shorter gearing. The WRX Type RA uses a closer ratio gearbox and a three-spoke leather steering wheel from Nardi.

In Europe, the WRX was introduced as the Impreza GT, and as the Impreza Turbo 2000 (UK). It came with 208 hp (155 kW; 211 PS).

==== GC8B (October 1993 – August 1994) - Version I ====
In October 1993, Subaru introduced the 1994 model year WRX which produced 240 PS (177 kW; 237 hp). The rear rotors were substituted from ventilated disk to solid disk. October 1993 was also the start of production of the wagon version, with 220 PS (162 kW; 217 hp). As this was the first STi-badged Impreza, this is typically referred to as the version 1.

The first STi was known simply as "WRX STi version" and 100 per month were produced starting from February 1994. These cars were taken from the factory assembly line and modified at STi with the required parts. It had 250 PS (184 kW; 247 hp).

A lightweight version called the Type RA was also offered, again with many amenities deleted to reduce weight and cost. Producing 275 PS (202 kW; 271 hp), this version of the WRX STi came with a Driver Controlled Center Differential (DCCD). This device was an electromechanical differential that could lock the differential. Intercooler water spray was also fitted for the RA model.

==== GC8C (September 1994 – September 1996) - Version II ====
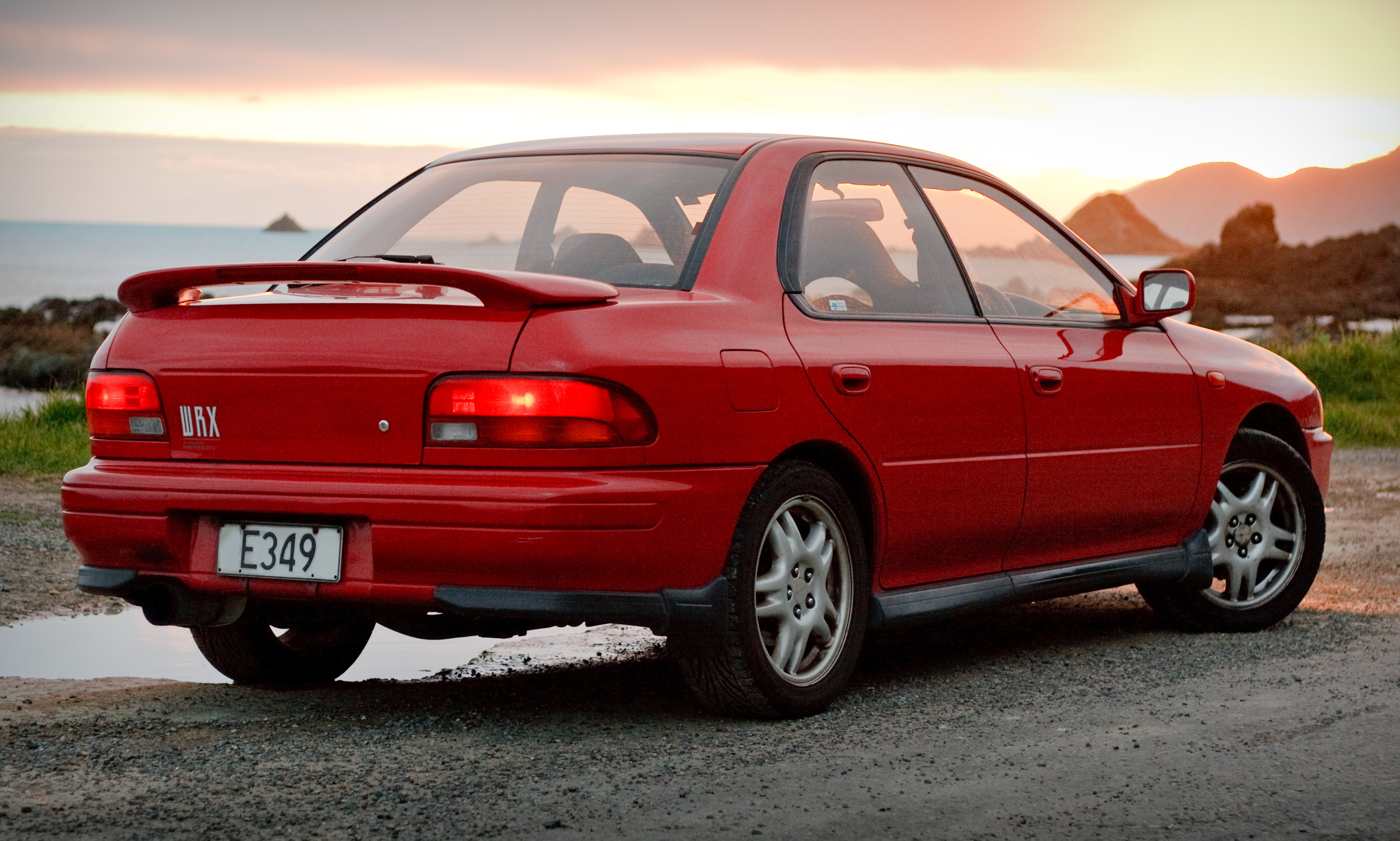
1995 Subaru Impreza WRX (GC8C)

In November 1994, the WRX had a power increase to 260 PS (191 kW; 256 hp). The wheel diameters were increased to 16 inches (410 mm) and brake rotors were both changed to ventilated disks. In Japan, there was a Version of the WRX Sports Wagon with Outback trim, a bull bar and tailgate mounted spare wheel called the "Impreza Gravel Express".

To commemorate Colin McRae's success in the international rally scene, Subaru in the UK released 200 limited edition "Series McRae" Turbo 2000's in June 1995, prepared by Prodrive. These vehicles were finished in a very limited "Rally Blue" color scheme, sported gold 16-inch alloy wheels, McRae decals, individual numbered badging from 1–201 (car 13 was never built since the number 13 is considered unlucky), and a factory-fitted electric tilt/slide sunroof. Recaro seats were fitted in the front, and the rear seats and side panels were retrimmed in the same Le Mans/Avus material.

The regular STi's engine output stood at 275 PS (202 kW; 271 hp). The car weighed 1,240 kg (2,734 lb) and had gold wheels like those on the World Rally Championship Impreza. Now, the STi was built alongside the WRX on the production line rather than being sent to STi.

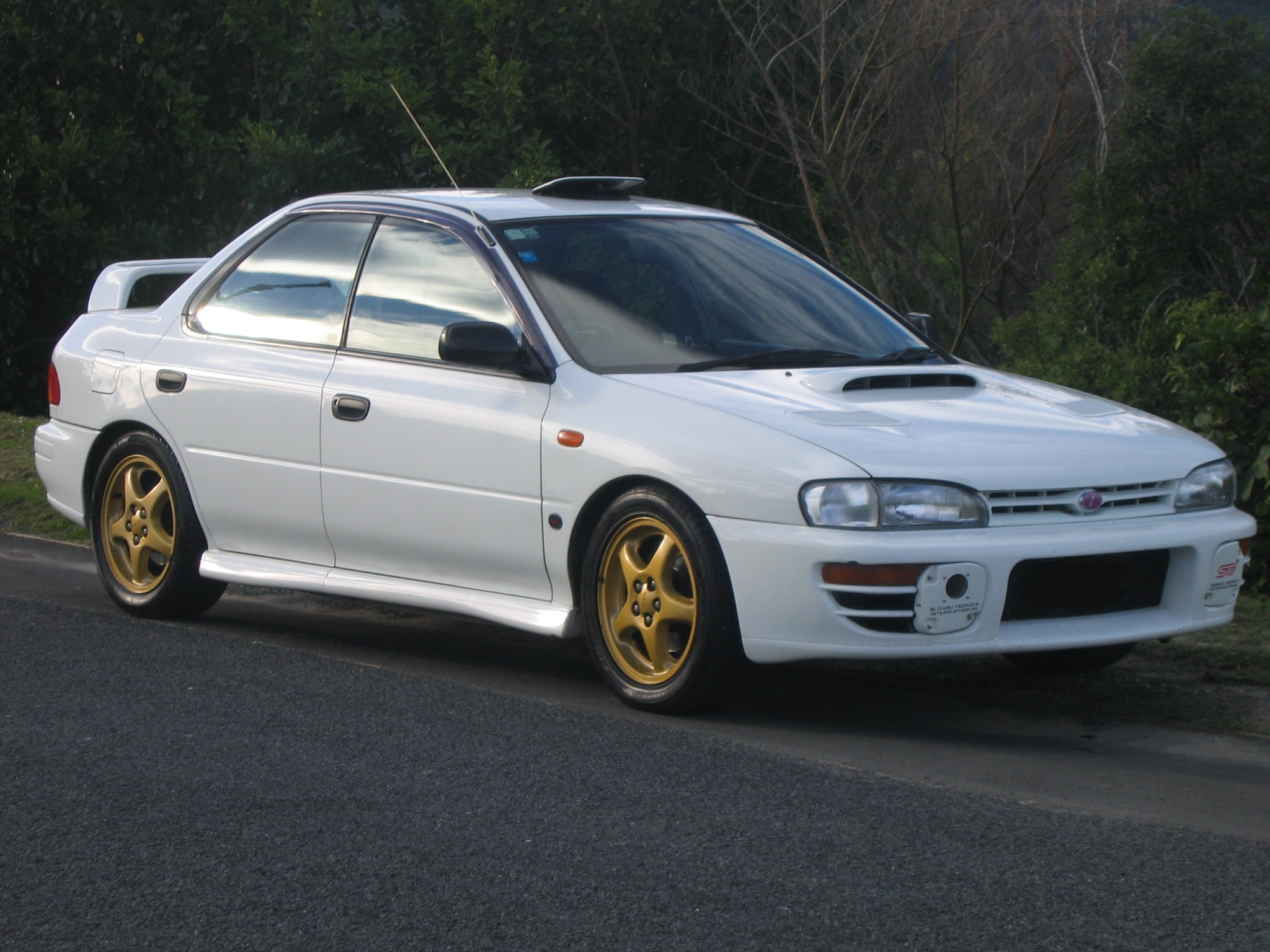
1995 Subaru Impreza WRX STI RA

The 1996 model year WRX debuted in January 1996. The WRX design received minimal mechanical changes, but a WRX V-Limited Edition was introduced to celebrate the success of the Impreza WRC car in the FIA WRC. It was mechanically the same to the WRX but had a curb weight nudge to 1,240 kg (2,734 lb). The V-limited cars are painted in World Rally Blue. A WRX STi Version II V-Limited edition was also produced. The interior is colored blue on the seat inserts and carpeting. The WRX Type RA STi Version II received a radio and air-conditioning in the V-limited form. 1,000 WRX STi Version II V-limited were produced, with 555 WRX Type RA STi Version II V-limited models produced.

==== GC8D (September 1996 – September 1997) - Version III ====
In September 1996, the WRX was updated with new styling. The WRX now has a power rating of 280 PS (206 kW; 276 hp) and now weighed 1,250 kg (2,756 lb). Although it actually developed about 300 horsepower, the output was under-reported at the then-established gentlemen's agreement power limit of 280 PS.

Subaru in the UK released the Turbo 2000 "Catalunya" in March 1997, a limited production of 200 cars (again excluding car number 13) in black with red flecks riding on gold alloy wheels. The Catalunya was made to celebrate winning Subaru's second WRC manufacturer's title at the Rally of Spain (Catalunya).

With GC8D came the start of the coupé version of the WRX. It is called the WRX Type R. The coupe was chosen by Prodrive for use in the WRC because it was lighter and stiffer than the sedan, although it carried the same exterior dimensions. It was essentially a two-door version of the WRX Type RA meaning it had DCCD, minimal sound insulation, close-gear ratios and hardened gearbox. This car also has a water-spray nozzle to dampen the top of the intercooler. The water will then evaporate, taking heat away from the intercooler and cooling the intake charge. This car was produced on an order-only basis. An estimated 10,000 Type R models were produced for the Japanese Domestic Market. Also, there was a WRX Type RA (sedan) available, with a roof vent instead of map lights, and wind up windows, although electrics are an option from factory.

Also available was a WRX Type R V-limited. It has a WRX motor with no forged internals like the STI, and it misses out on the four-pot front brakes as they are to be installed by rally teams. It has a roof vent and is lightweight, making a good base for a rally car.

==== GC8E (September 1997 – August 1998) - Version IV ====
In Europe, the Subaru Impreza GT's (Turbo 2000 in UK) interior was updated to leather. For the STi, power remained at 280 PS. Forged pistons were also added. The interior and the cockpit were changed into a newer design along with the new white colored gauges. (<- leather was an option and there was no such thing as an EU spec STi.)

For the UK, the Turbo 2000 "Terzo" was released in April 1998. 333 cars in blue with gold alloy wheels were produced to celebrate Subaru's WRC title.

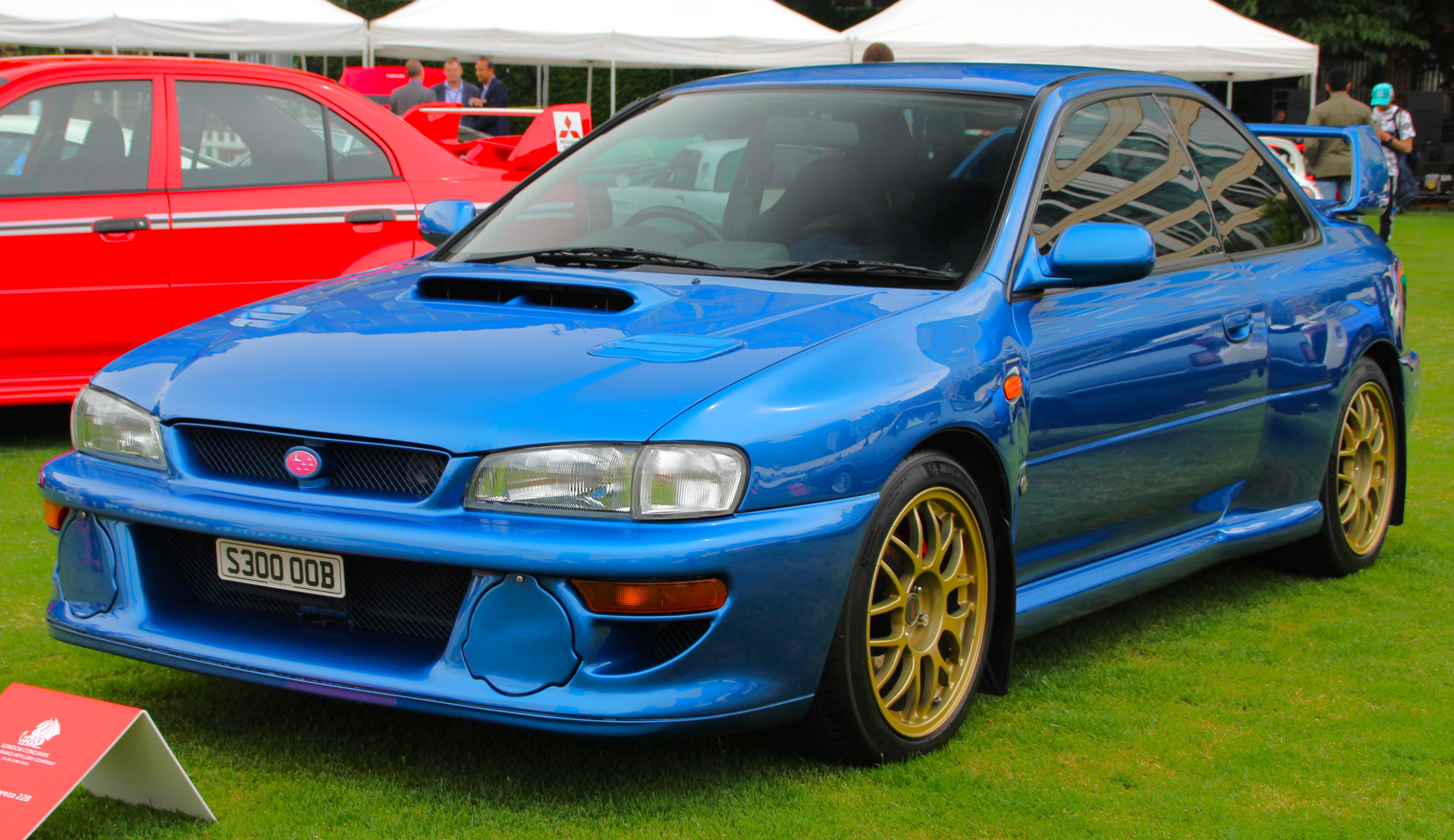
Subaru Impreza 22B STI

In 1998, Subaru of Japan produced a widebody, coupe WRX STi called the "22B STi" produced between March and August 1998. The 22B was used to commemorate both Subaru's 40th anniversary as well as the third consecutive manufacturer's title for Subaru in the FIA World Rally Championship. On the release of the sales, all 400 Japanese units sold out in from 30 minutes to 48 hours, depending on the report. Another 24 were produced for export markets—16 for the UK, along with another 5 for Australia, and 3 prototypes. The 16 cars imported to the UK were modified by Prodrive, with longer gear ratios, and UK specification lights. Because 50 22Bs had already been imported privately into the UK, Subaru had to wait until 1999 to register the 16 officially imported cars under the VCA's Single Vehicle Approval scheme. It performed incredibly well in the snow, as the unique four-wheel-drive and quick clutch allowed for easy control.

The 22B had the EJ22G engine (note, the internal Subaru material states the closed-deck block comes from a version III EJ20G). This means the displacement was increased from 2.0 L (1,994 cc) to 2.2 L (2,212 cc), bored up to 96.9 mm (3.81 in). Officially, it produced 280 PS (206 kW; 276 hp) at 6,000 rpm and 363 N⋅m; 268 lbf⋅ft (37 kg⋅m) at 3,200 rpm of torque, fuel feed by Electronic Fuel Injection and an IHI RHF 5HB turbocharger. This car was given a unique color of blue and had fender flared widebody taken from the Peter Stevens designed WRC car, thus widening the width by 80 mm (3.15 inches). The car has a unique hood, front and rear fenders, a WRC-inspired front bumper and a unique adjustable rear wing. During assembly, a WRX Type R chassis was taken off the line. The fenders were replaced with the 22B STi fenders. The suspension is provided by Bilstein, while the brakes were four-pot front/two-pot rear STi calipers, painted red. The wheels were increased in size from the standard WRX Type R STI Version from 16- to 17-inches and the clutch was upgraded to a sintered twin clutch with a ceramic disk. The origin of the name 22B has been debated. The 22 referred to the 2.2-liter displacement and the B was thought to be for the Bilstein suspension. This would correlate with the idea that Subaru sells a Legacy Spec B, where the B represents the Bilstein suspension. However, the B is actually a Subaru internal code for Turbo. 22B is also hexadecimal for the number 555, in reference to State Express 555, Subaru's major sponsor in the WRC from 1993 to 2004. The car's curb weight is 1,270 kilograms (2,800 lb).

==== GC8F (September 1998 – September 1999) - Version V ====
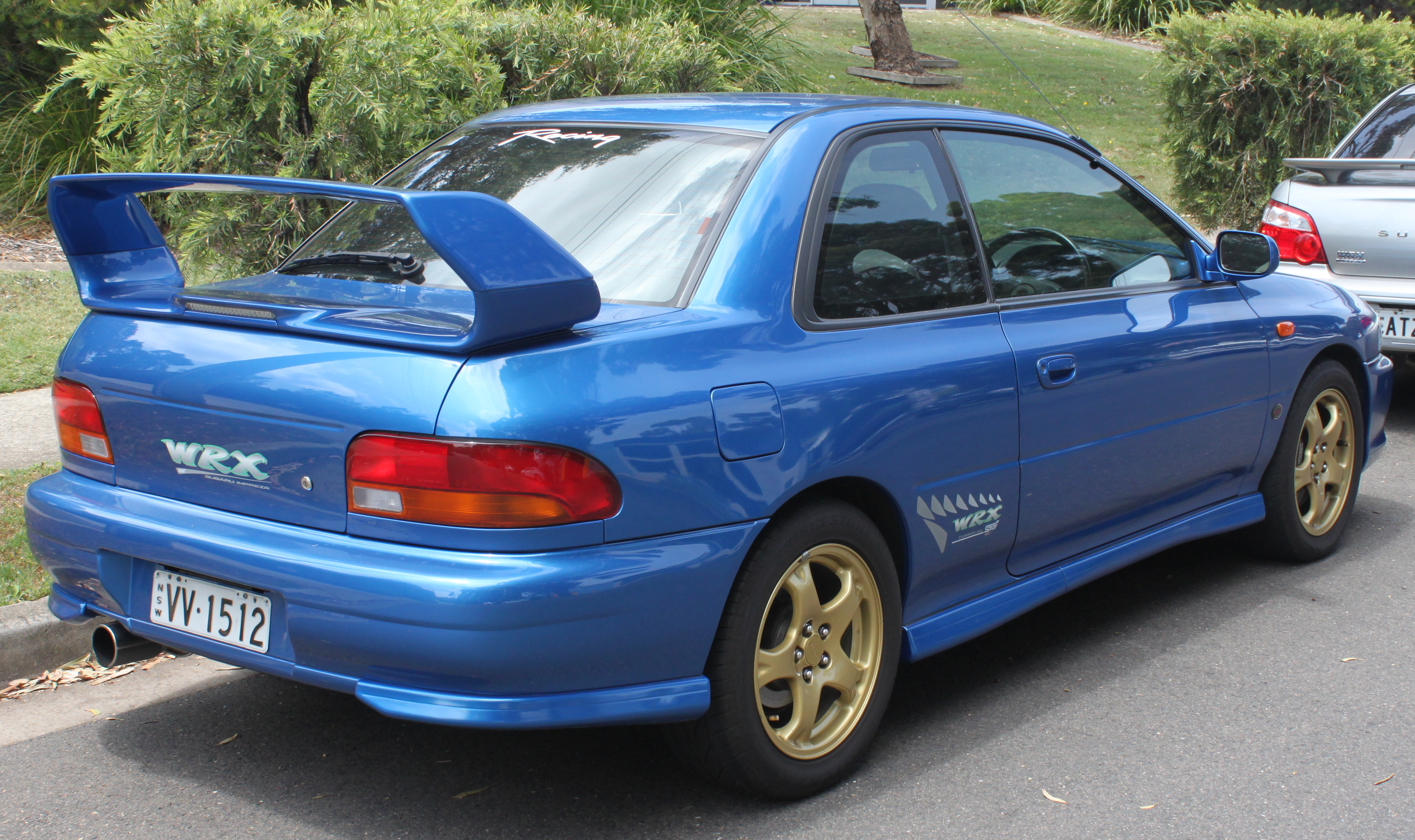
Subaru Impreza (MY99) WRX STI Version 5 coupe

Mechanically the GC8F was virtually the same as its predecessor. The torque was increased a little from 242 to 250 lb⋅ft (328 to 339 N⋅m) at 4000 rpm. The weight also continues to increase and is set at 1,300 kg (2,800 lb).

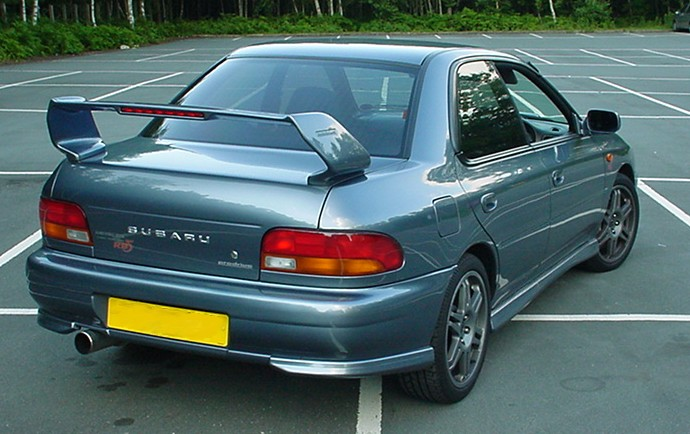
Subaru Impreza WRX RB5

To celebrate the return of British driver Richard Burns to the rally team, a limited edition of 444 Turbo 2000 "RB5" models in gray were created in 1999 for the UK. The basic model had little more than cosmetic differences, but most had the WR Sport Performance Pack, an option consisting of a new ECU and exhaust for 240 PS (177 kW; 237 hp) and 350 N⋅m (258 lb⋅ft) torque. There was also an optional Prodrive suspension pack.

The standard UK Impreza Turbo 2000 was also tuned and partly restyled by Prodrive in 1999 to create the "Prodrive WR Sport". It featured a unique interior, suspension upgrade, new bodykit and wheels, plus WR Sport decals and an optional ECU upgrade.

For the STI, the power stayed the same as the previous version but the engine layout and design was made cleaner and was dubbed as the "Boxer Phase 2" engine. The facelift the rest of the Impreza line had was also applied to the STI. The WRX STI weighed 1,270 kg (2,800 lb). There were 1000 WRX Type RA STI Version 5 Limited cars and each had a four-month waiting period. The interior was also changed slightly, including seats and steering. This model was also produced as a 555 limited edition.

==== GC8G (September 1999 – September 2000) - Version VI ====
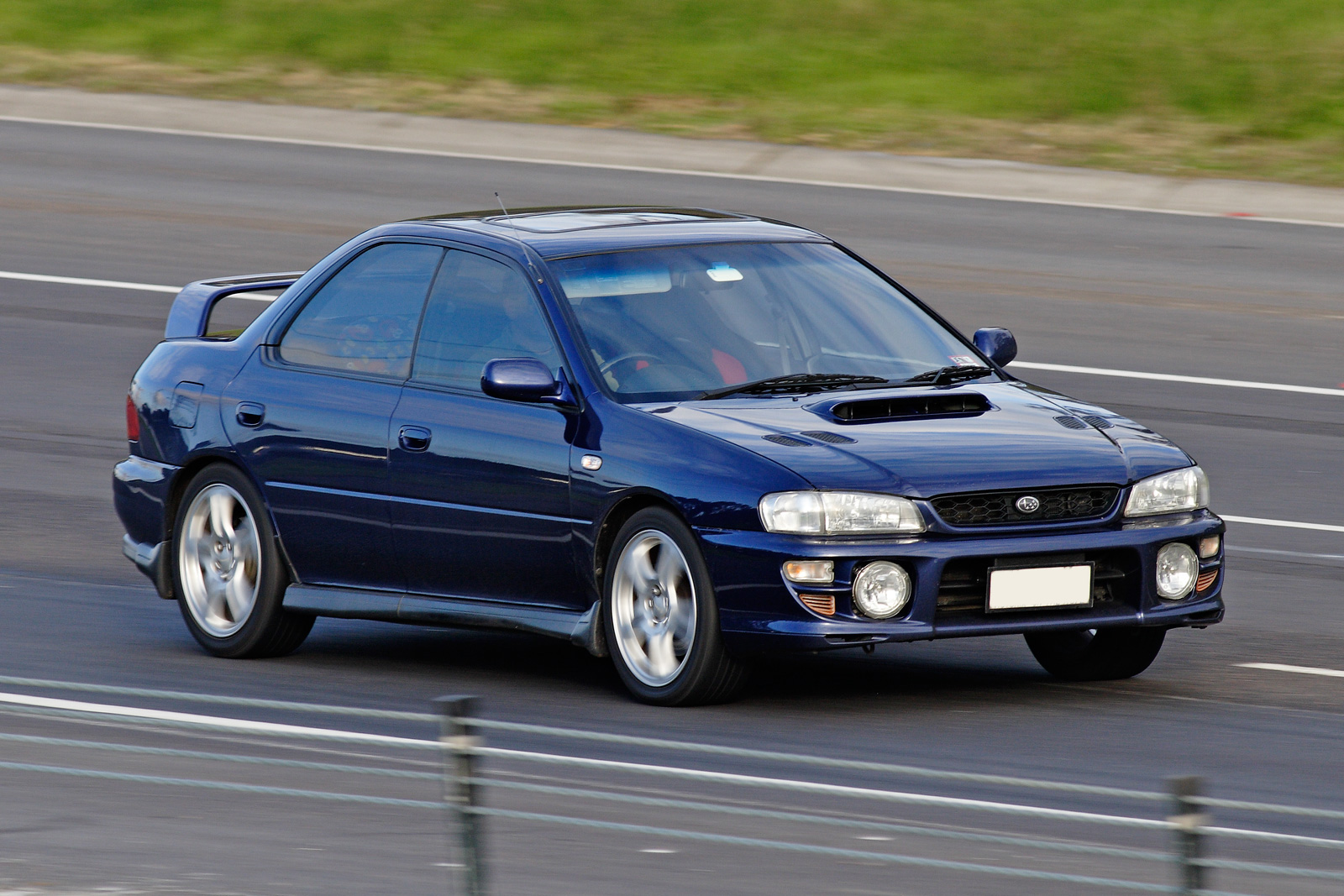
1999–2000 Subaru Impreza WRX sedan (GC8G)

The last version of the GC WRX was introduced in September 1999. There is no change in the mechanical specifications. Added features are newly designed alloy wheels, color-coded mirrors and door handles, remote central locking, intermittent wipers with a timer and map lights.

The European GT model received further upgrades in the form of more parts from the STI range. The front brakes became Subaru branded four-pot calipers with 294 mm (11.6 in) discs, the wheels having become 16-inch lightweight alloys. The STI 4 high-level wing was fitted to the sedan, and STI-style front bucket seats and firmer suspension were also fitted. The "Phase 2" engine now fitted developed 160 kW (218 PS; 215 bhp), an increase of 5 kW (7 PS; 7 bhp) over the previous model.

Subaru Impreza P1

To counter the grey imports of high-performance Japanese variants, Subaru UK commissioned Prodrive to produce a limited edition of 1,000 two-door cars in Sonic Blue, called the WRX "P1". Released in March 2000, they were taken from the STI Type R lines and used for the P1. The P1 and Australian Subaru delivered STI Version 5 were the only coupe versions of the WRX STI GC chassis to receive ABS. In order to allow for ABS, the DCCD was dropped. Engine output was boosted to 276 bhp (206 kW; 280 PS), and the suspension optimised for British roads. Options were available from Subaru consisting of four-piston front brake calipers, electric Recaro seats, 18-inch wheels and a P1 stamped backbox. The P1, or Prodrive One, is echoed in the name of the Prodrive P2 concept car.

Likewise, for the STI, most of the changes were cosmetic with the fender being sculpted to be more aggressive. There were 2,000 WRX STI Version 6 Limited model produced, plus 1000 of the WRX STI Type R coupe Version 6 Limited, 2,000 of the WRX STI RA Version 6 Limited, and also 500 of the WRX STI Version 6 Limited hatchback models.

In 2000, STI released the WRX STI "S201", of which 300 were produced. This series is a limited production series that sports an engine output of 224 kW (305 PS; 300 hp) at 6500 rpm and 353 N⋅m (260 lbf⋅ft) at 4000 rpm as special variants were excluded from the gentlemen's agreement. The car was decked with nearly every single part from the STI catalogue. The S201 was a sedan that sported the only body-kitted S-series WRX STI. Weighing in at 1,270 kg (2,800 lb), the S201 had a tri-planar wing and a massive front air splitter. The entire suspension was composed of STI parts.

== Second generation (GD, GG; 2000) ==
Second generation
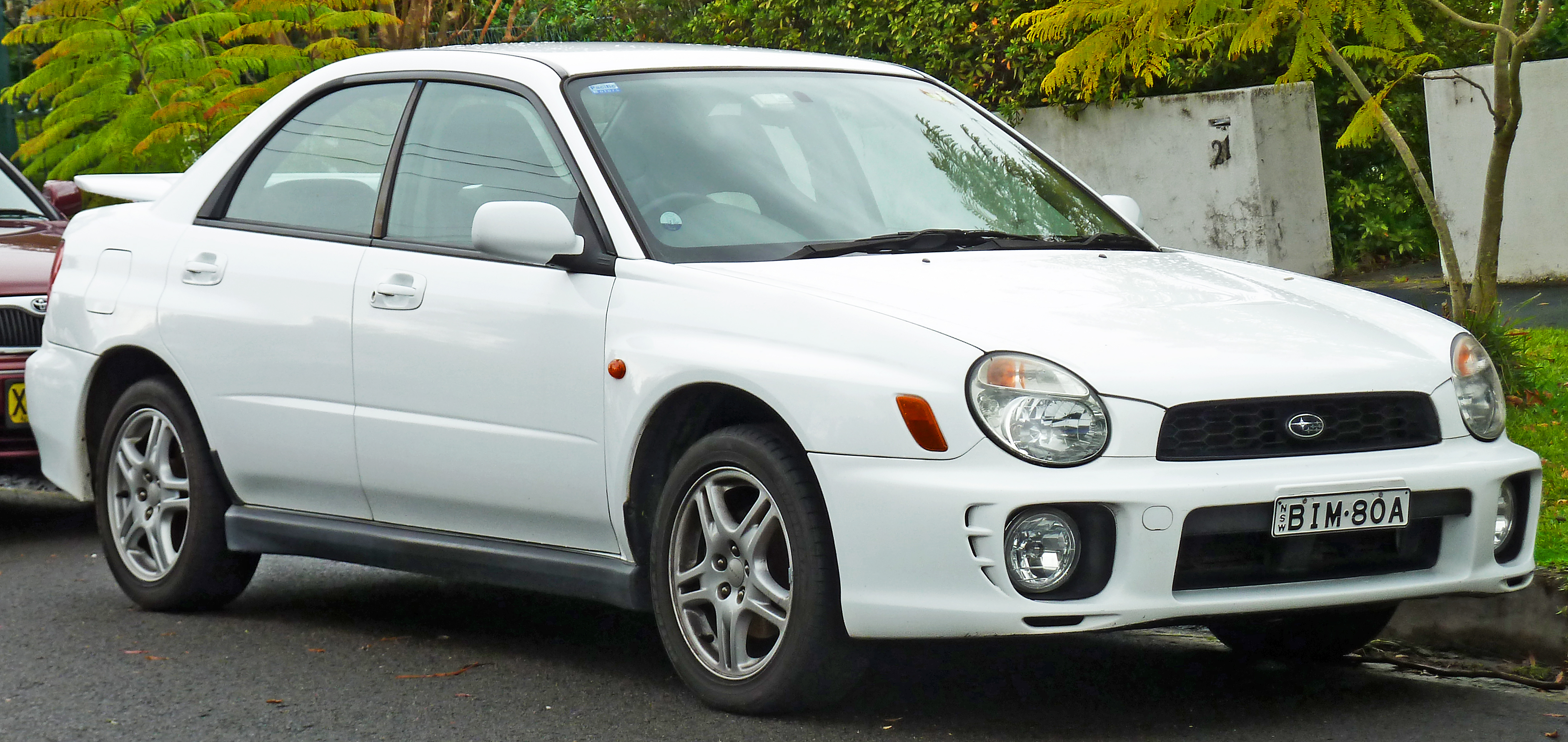
- Pre-facelift Subaru Impreza RS sedan ("Bugeye")

Overview
- Model code: GD (sedan); GG (wagon)
- Also called: Subaru Outback Sport; Saab 9-2X (2004–2006)
- Production: 2000–2007
- Model years: 2002–2007 (North America)
- Assembly: Japan: Ōta, Gunma

Body and chassis
- Body style: 4-door sedan 5-door wagon

Powertrain
- Engine: Gasoline: 1.5 L EJ15 H4; 1.6 L EJ16 H4; 2.0 L EJ20 H4; 2.0 L EJ20 turbo H4; 2.5 L EJ25 H4; 2.5 L EJ25 turbo H4
- Transmission: 4-speed automatic 5-speed manual 6-speed TY856WH3MA/ TY856WH4MA/TY856WW6MA manual

Dimensions
- Wheelbase: 2,525 mm (99.4 in)
- Length: 4,415 mm (173.8 in)
- Width: Sedan: 1,730 mm (68.1 in); Wagon: 1,695 mm (66.7 in)
- Height: 1,425 mm (56.1 in)
- Curb weight: 1,360 kg (2,998.3 lb)

Pre-facelift ("Bugeye")

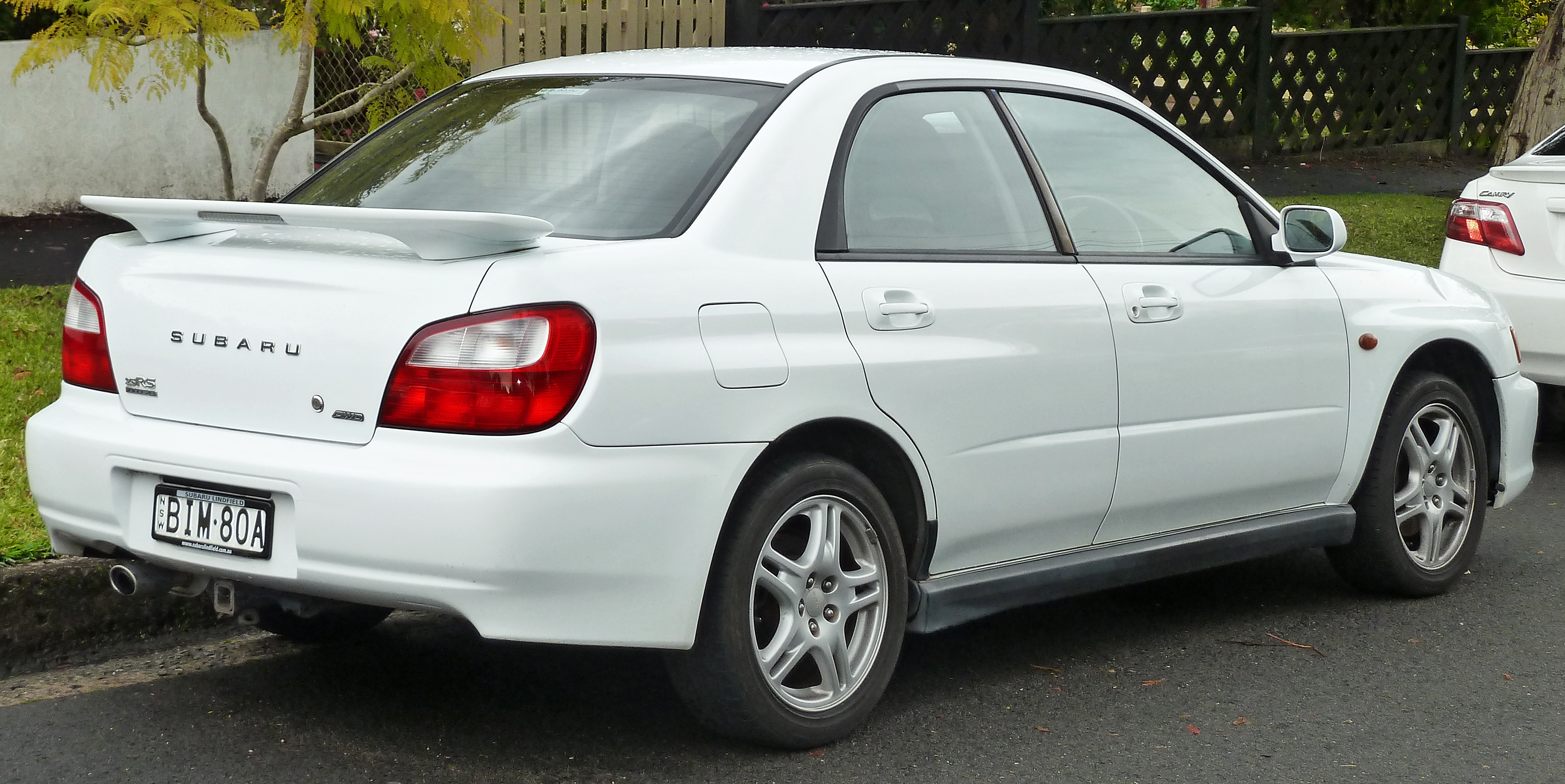
RS Sedan

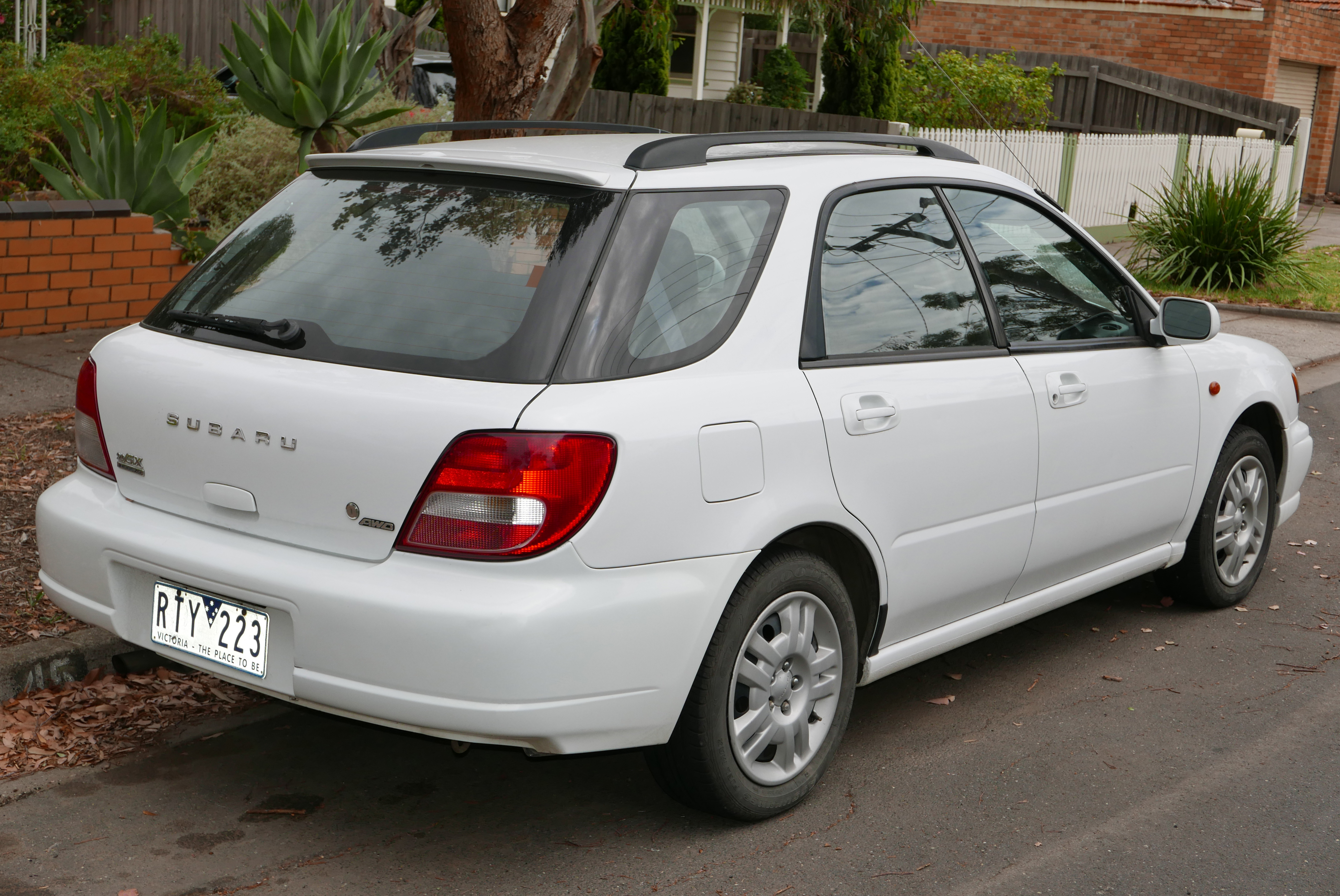
GX wagon/hatchback

Subaru introduced the "New Age" Impreza to Japan in August 2000. Larger in size compared to the previous iteration, the sedan increased its width by 40 millimetres (1.6 in), while the wagon notably increased by just 5 millimetres (0.2 in)—placing the two variants in different Japanese classification categories. The coupe body style from the first generation did not reappear for the new series, and the off-road appearance package that included contrasting-colored bumpers did carry over forward. Marketed as a separate model line, this North America-only variant was, as before, badged the Outback Sport.

Naturally aspirated flat-four (boxer) engines comprised the 1.5-liter EJ15, the 1.6-liter EJ16, the 2.0-liter EJ20, and the 2.5-liter EJ25. Turbocharged versions of the 2.0- and 2.5-liter engines were offered in the WRX and WRX STI models. STI models featured a more powerful 2.0-liter (2.5-liter outside of the Japanese market) turbocharged engine. WRX models featured a 2.0-liter turbocharged boxer engine until 2005, after which they switched to the 2.5-liter turbocharged engine.

At the Australian Wheels Car of the Year, the car won the overall COTY award in 2000. At the American MotorWeek Drivers' Choice Awards, the Impreza won the Best Sport Sedan in 2002 and the Best Performance Car in 2004.

=== First facelift ("Blobeye") ===
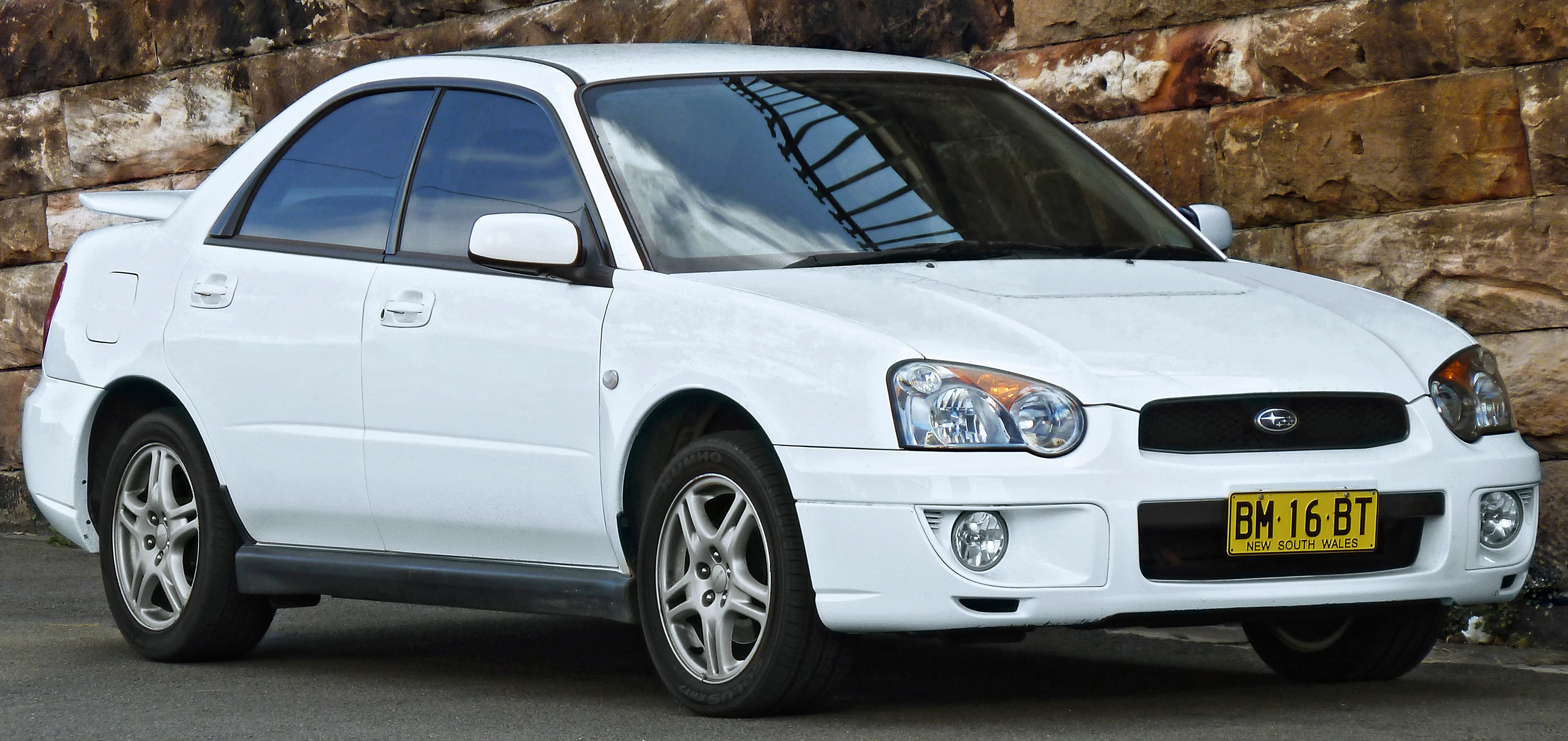
First facelift ("Blobeye") RS sedan

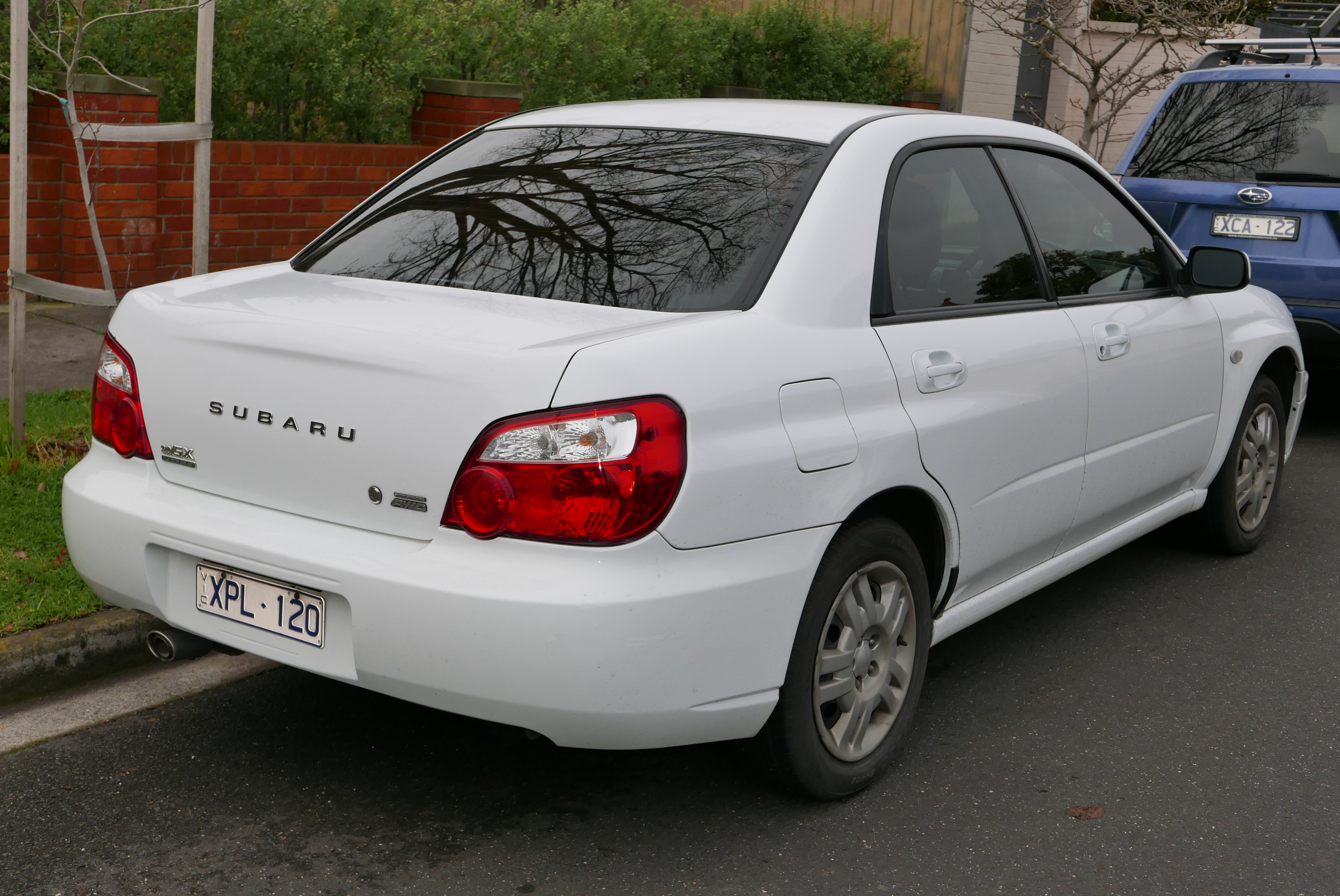
First facelift GX sedan

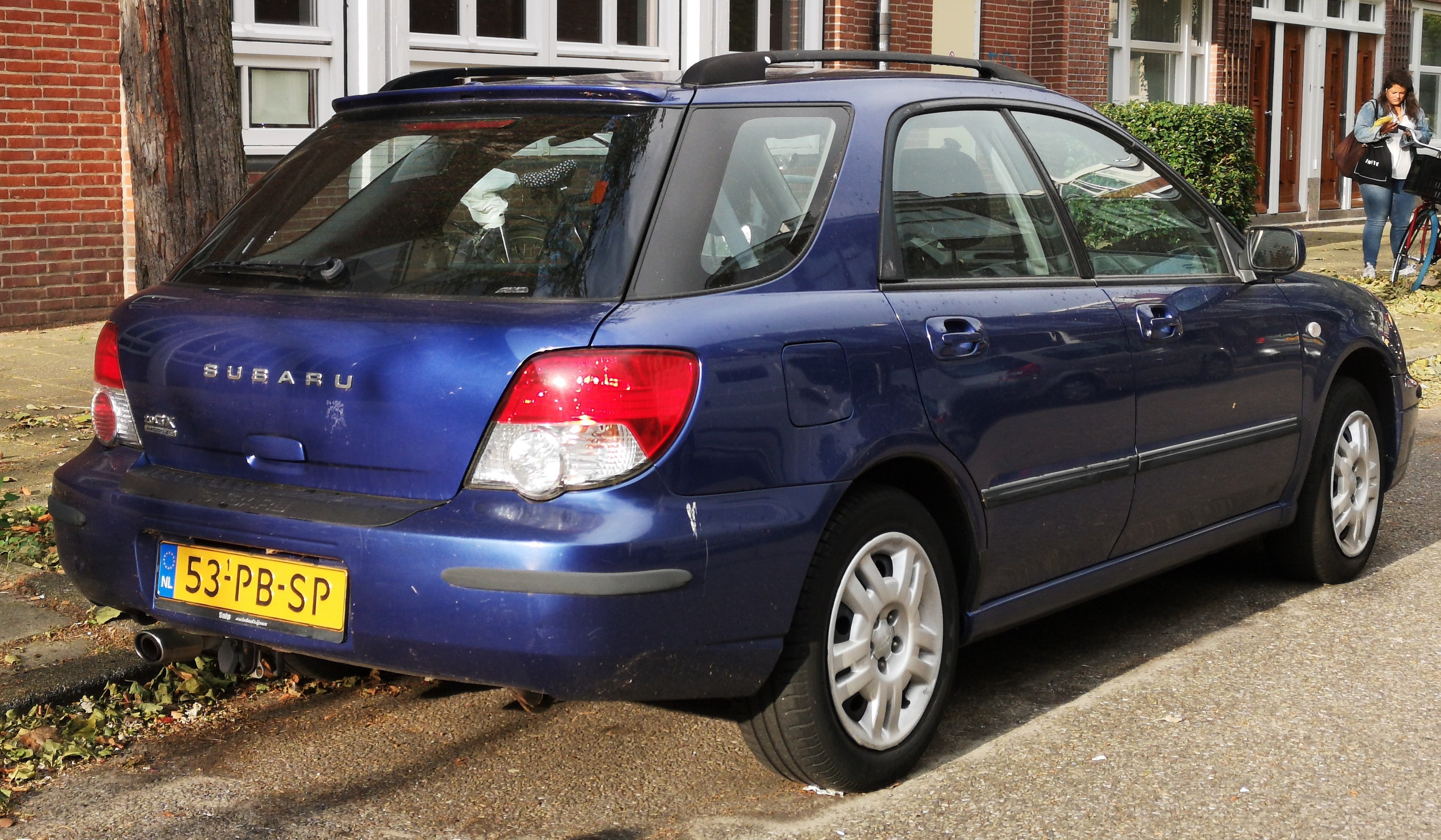
First facelift GX hatchback/wagon

=== Second facelift ("Hawkeye") ===
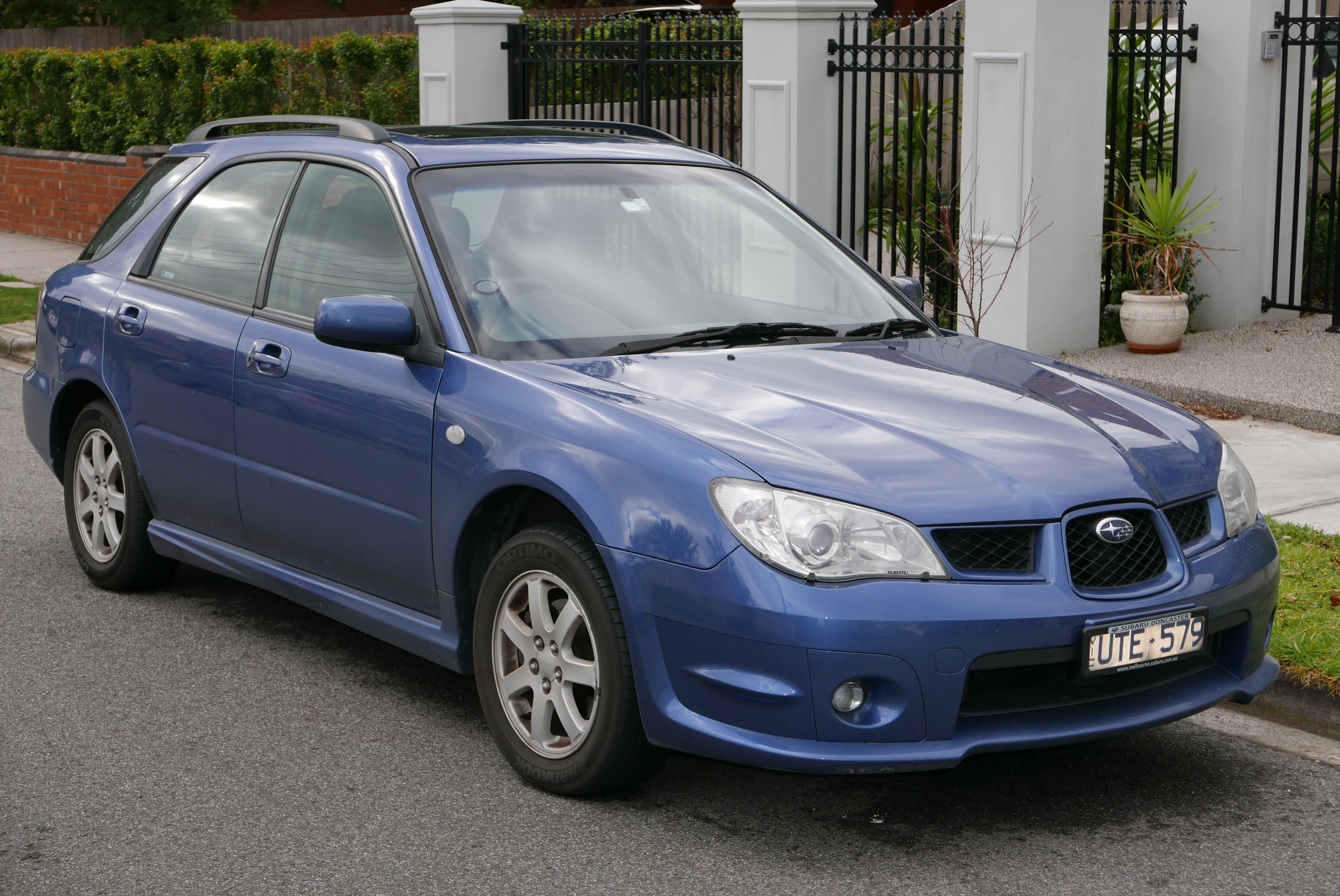
Second facelift ("Hawkeye") wagon/hatchback

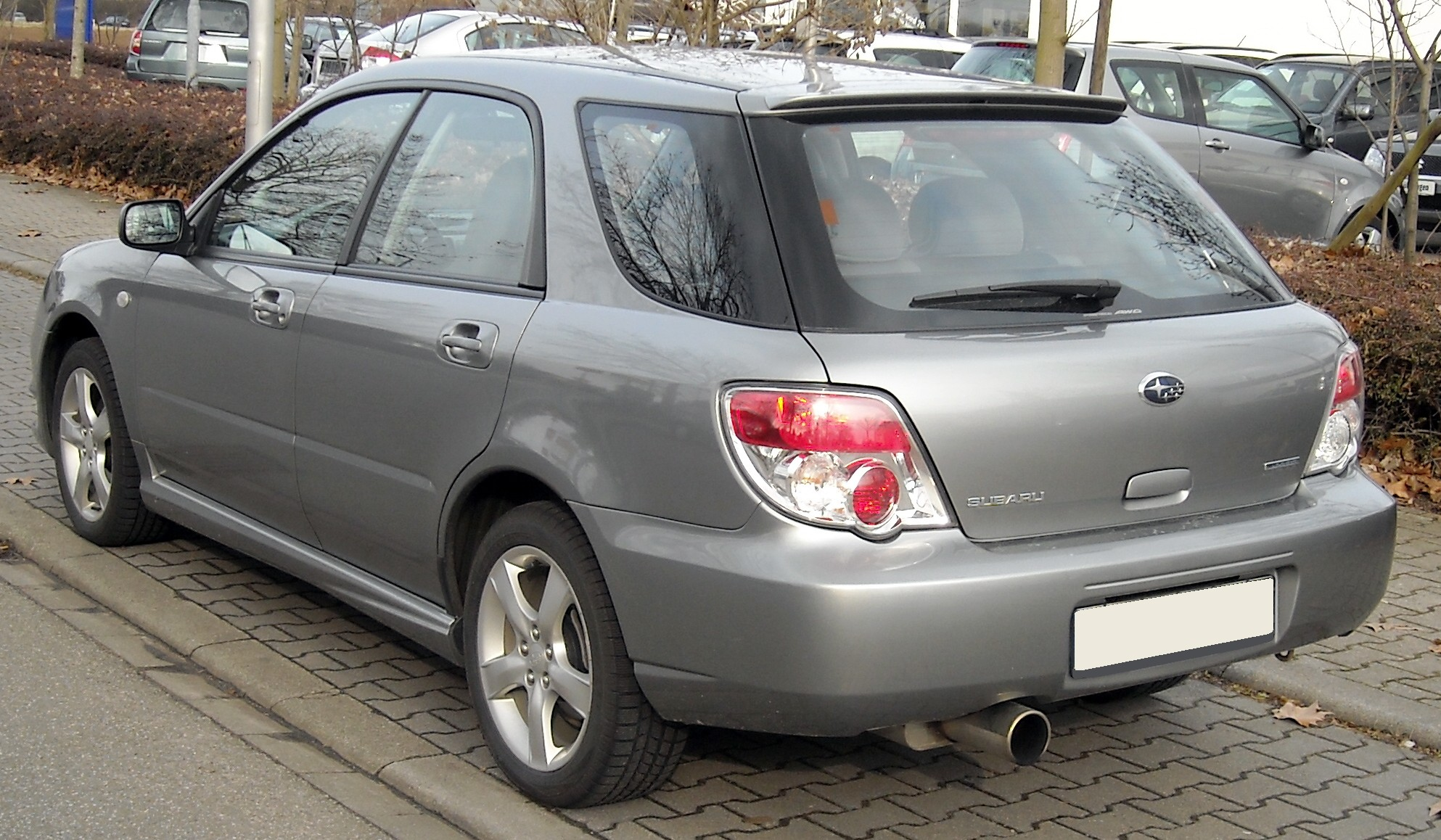
Second facelift wagon/hatchback

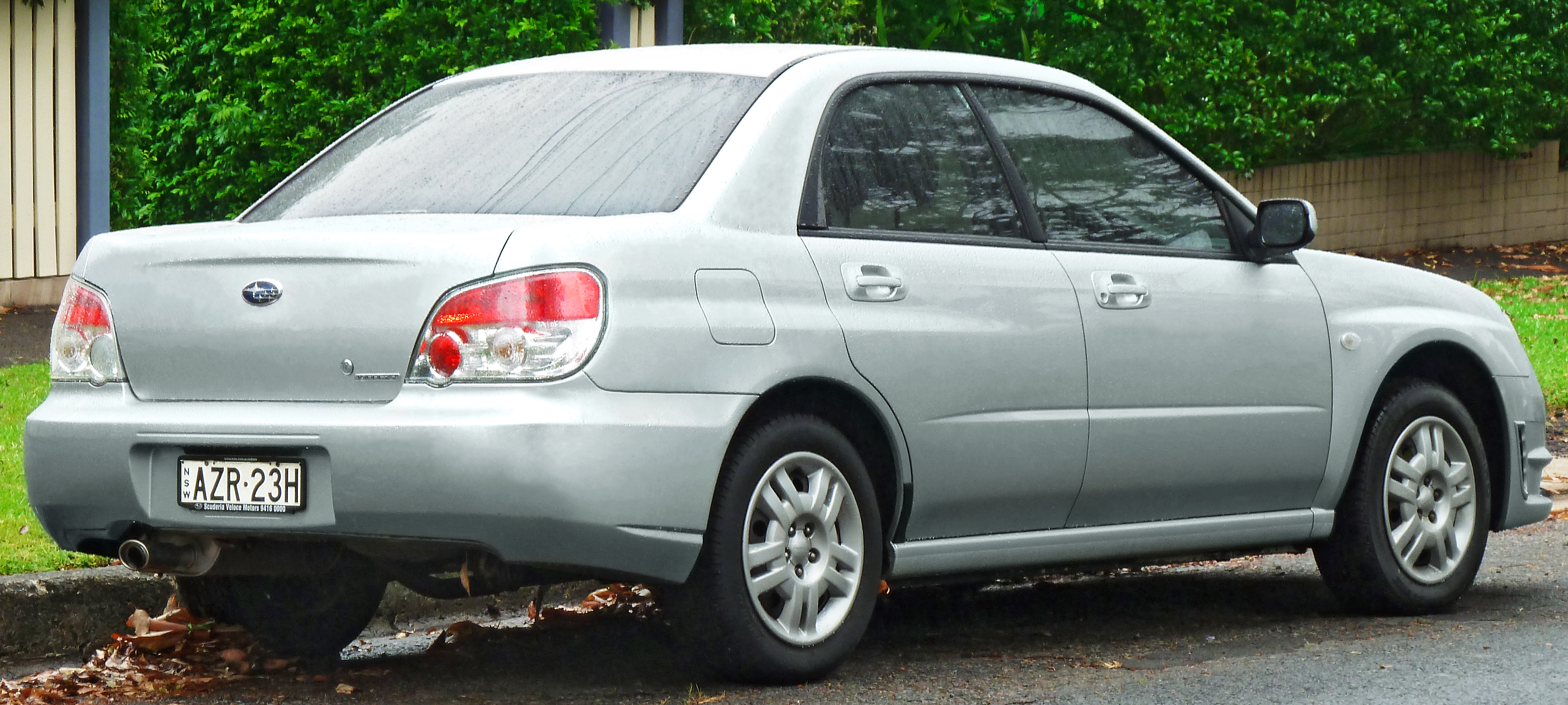
Second facelift sedan

=== Saab 9-2X ===
Subaru manufactured a badge engineered variant, marketed by Saab as the 9-2X for the North American market (2004-2006) in solely the wagon bodystyle. The 9-2X received redesigned front and rear styling as well as other interior, acoustic and technical modifications. This badge-engineered model has been colloquially referred to as a "Saabaru" among enthusiasts. See the second-generation Impreza WRX.

=== WRX ===
As with the first generation, the turbocharged WRX and the WRX STI variants were available in numerous specifications with various limited edition models sold, with the STI models being more performance focused. Subaru issued yearly updates to the STI, tweaking cosmetics and equipment levels, and also improving performance and handling.

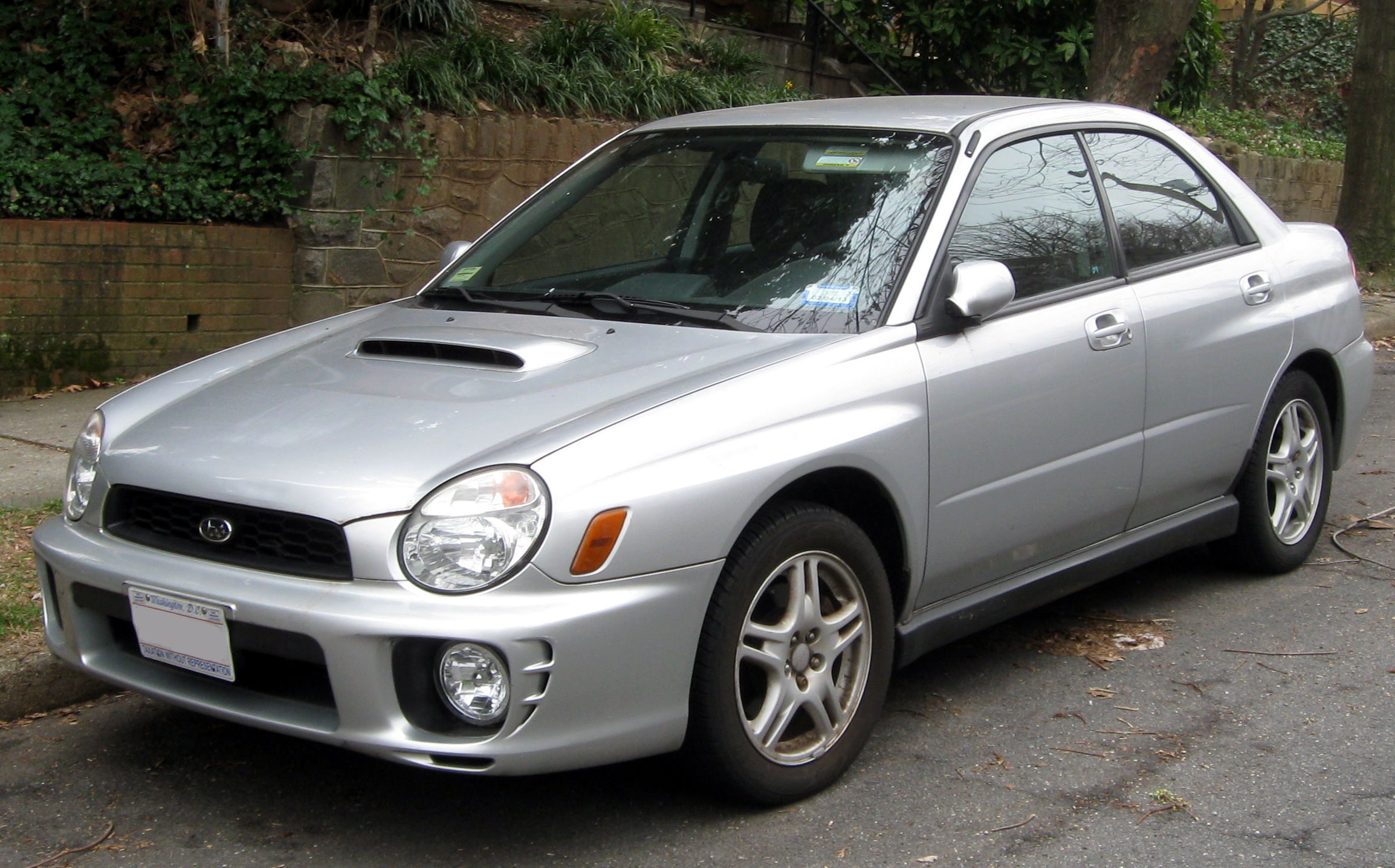
WRX sedan (pre-facelift)

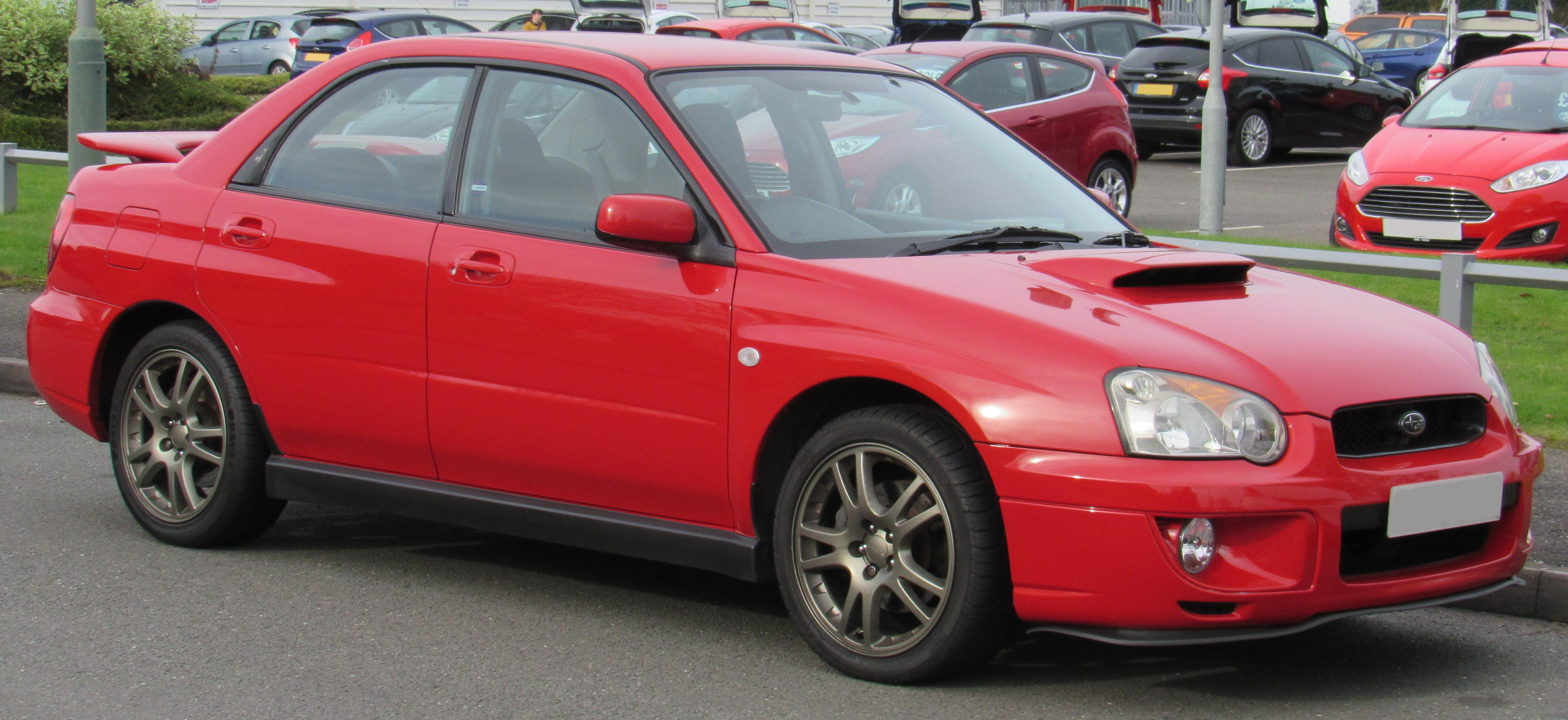
WRX sedan (first facelift) (with grey STI wheels)

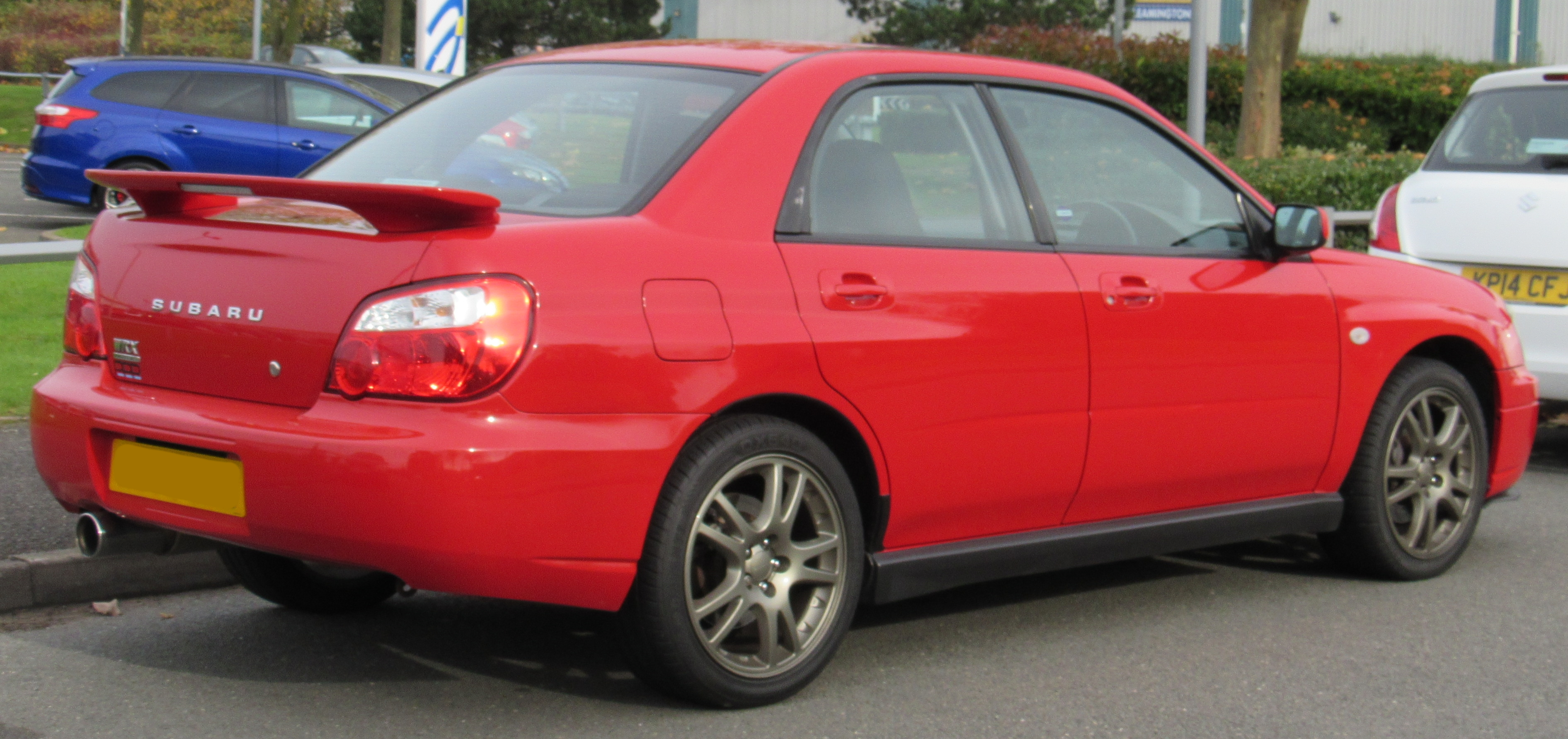
WRX sedan (first facelift) (with grey STI wheels)

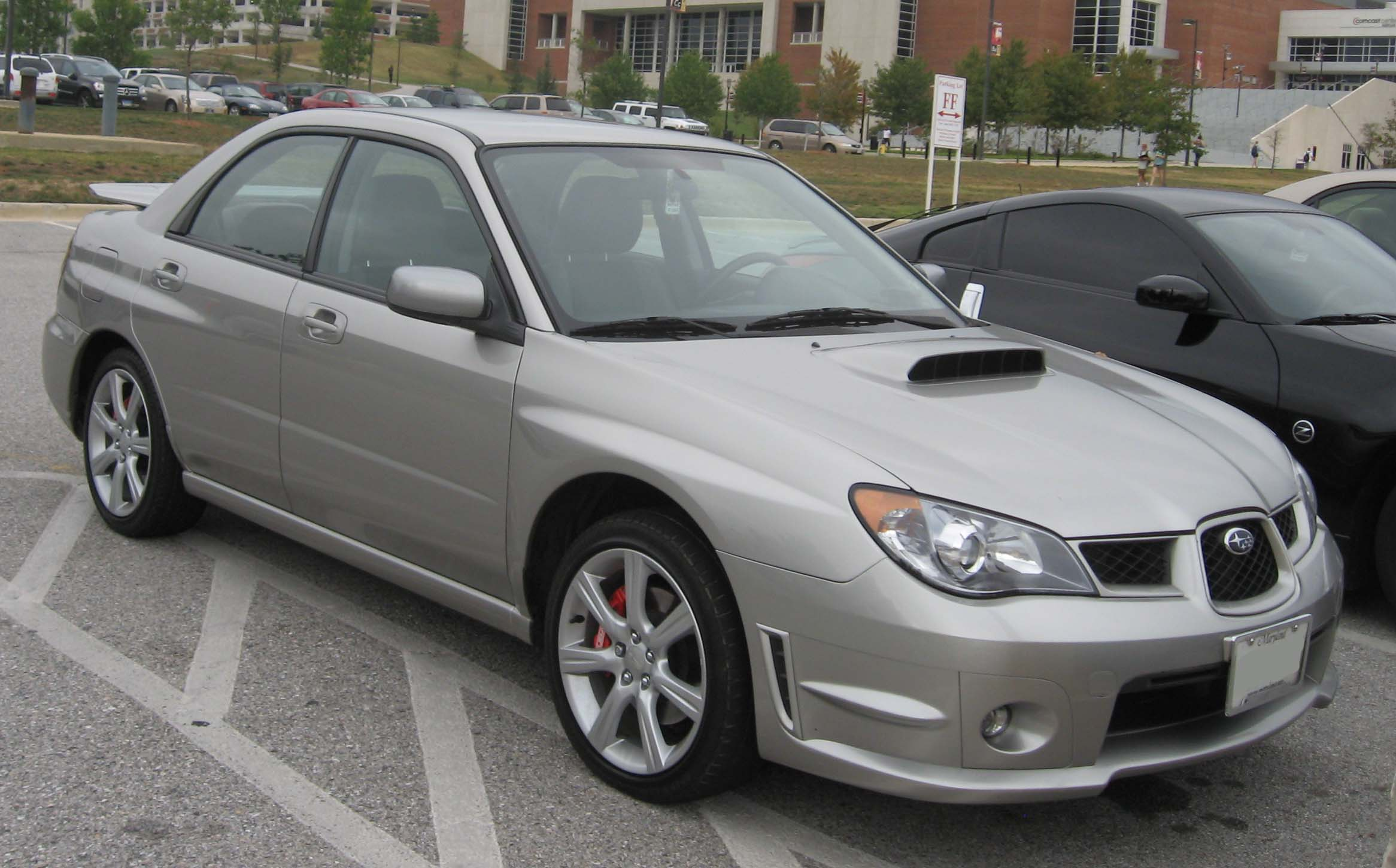
WRX sedan (second facelift)

=== WRX STI ===
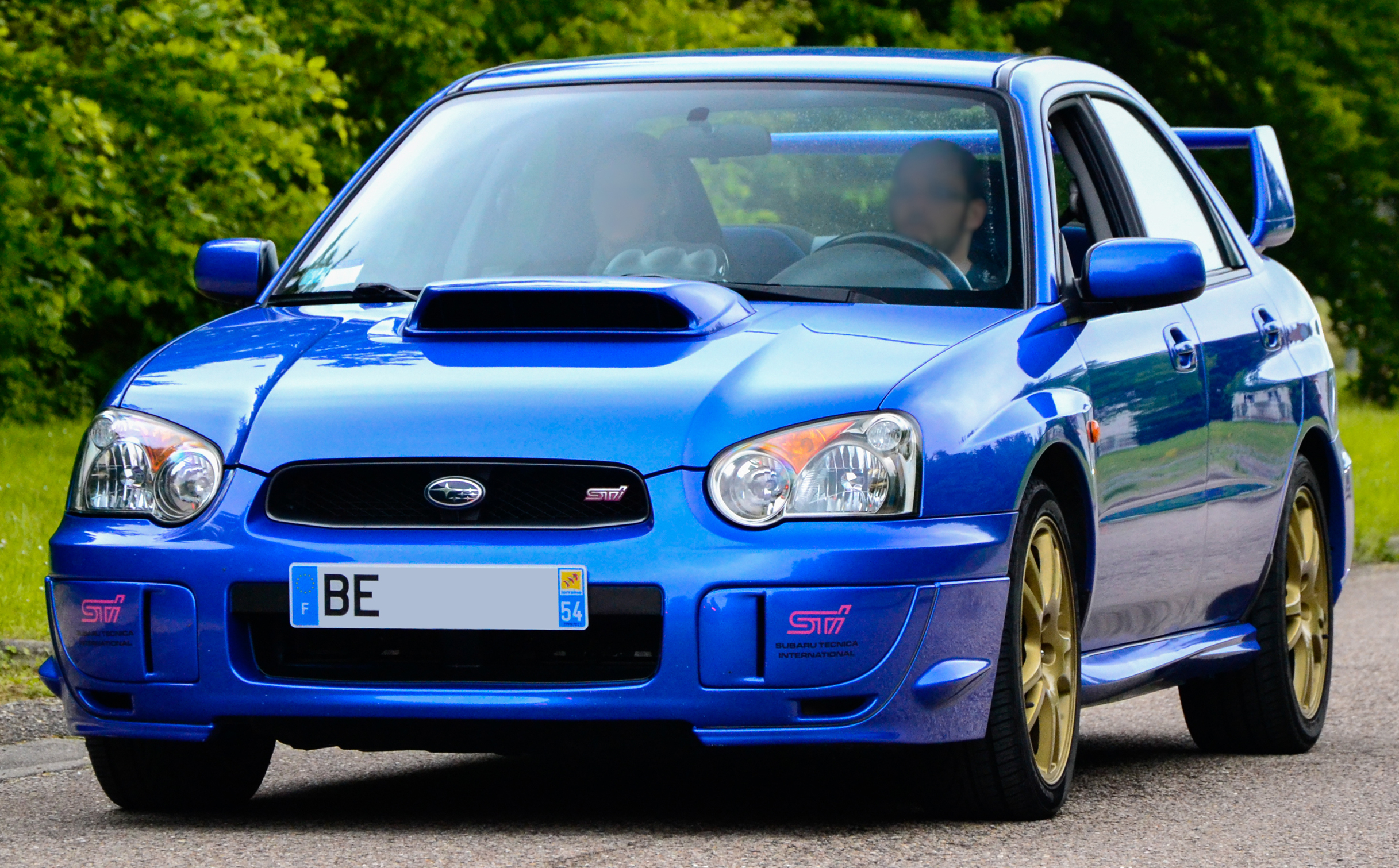
WRX STI sedan (first facelift)

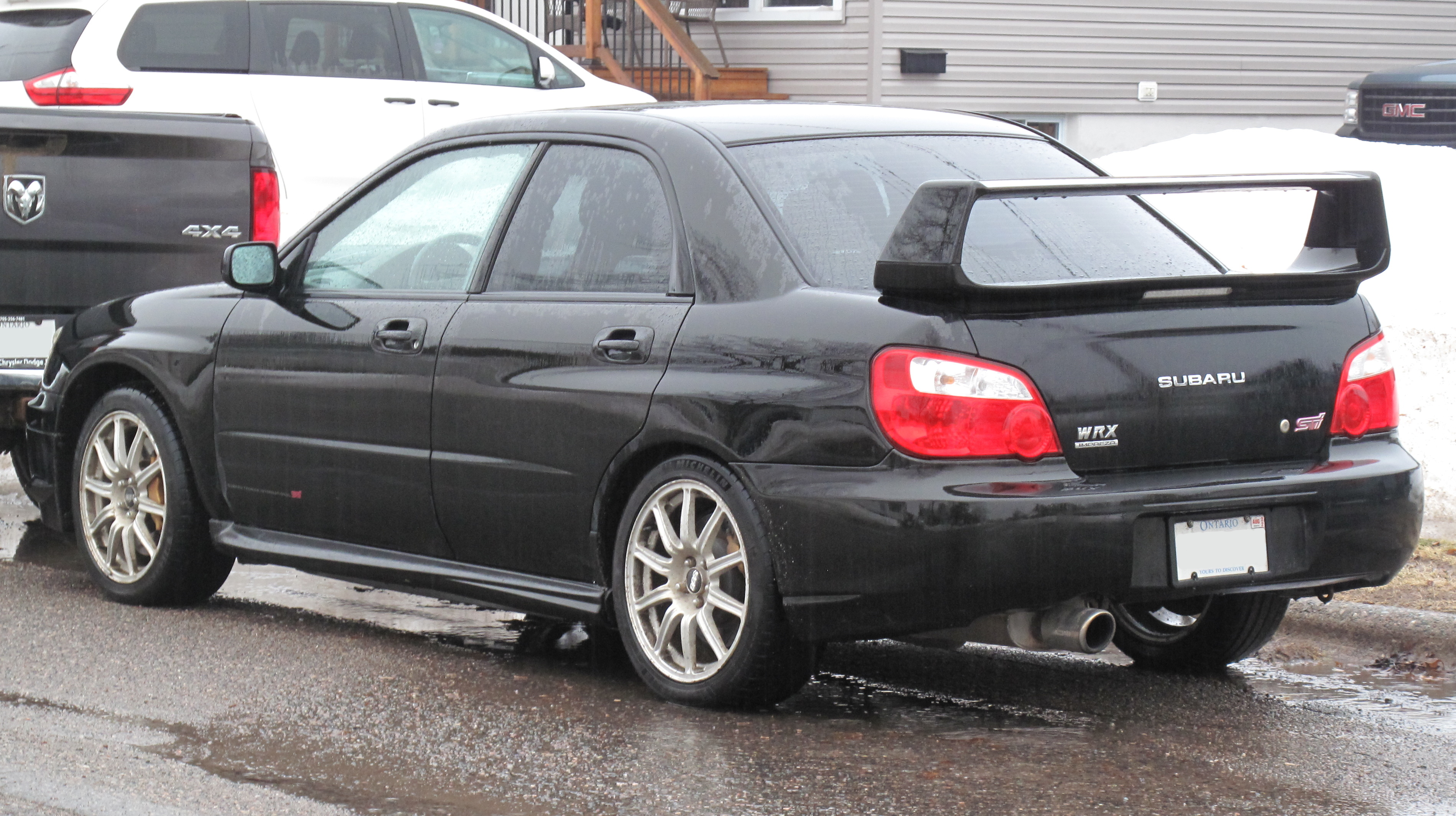
WRX STI sedan (first facelift)

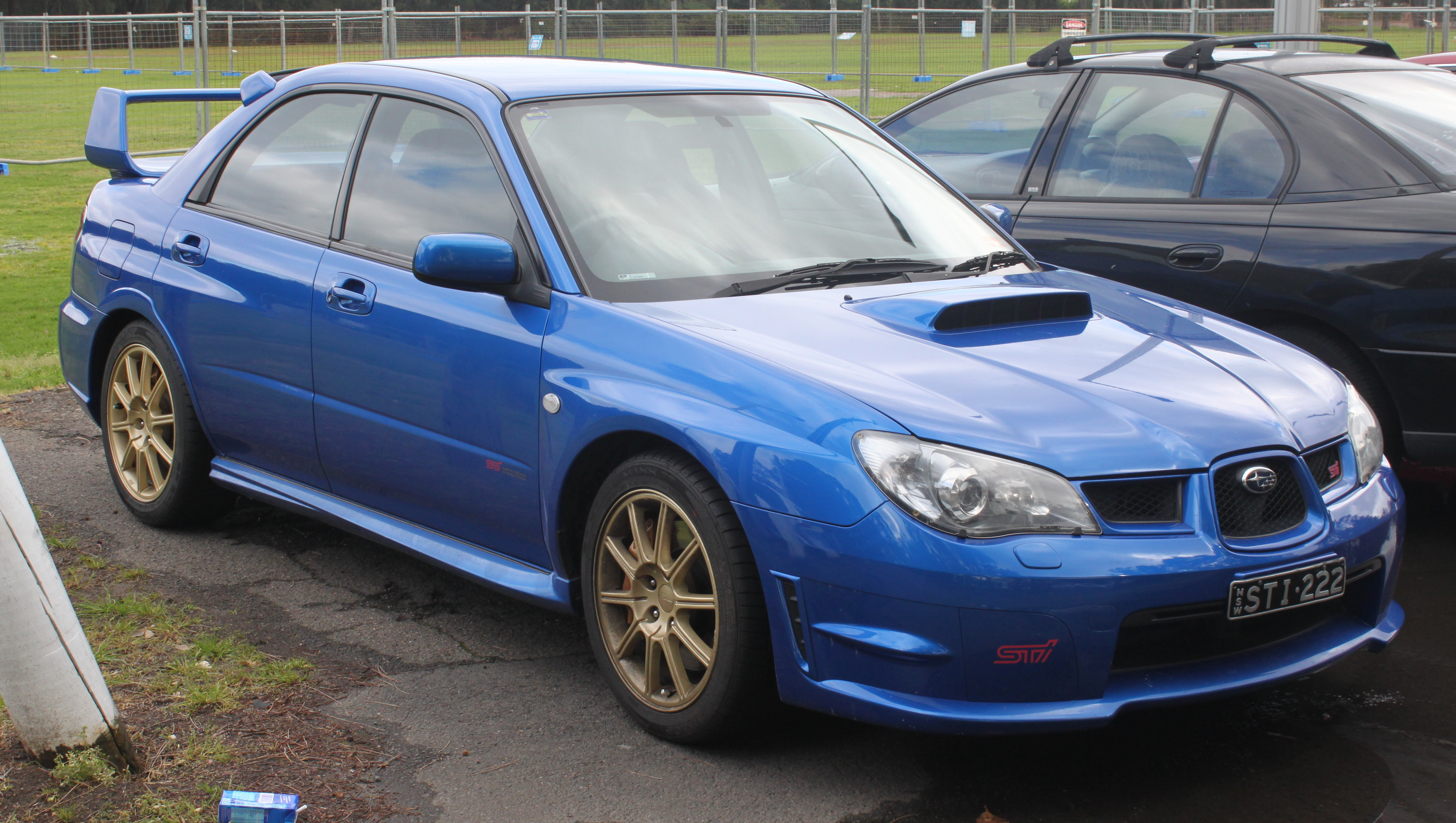
WRX STI sedan (second facelift)

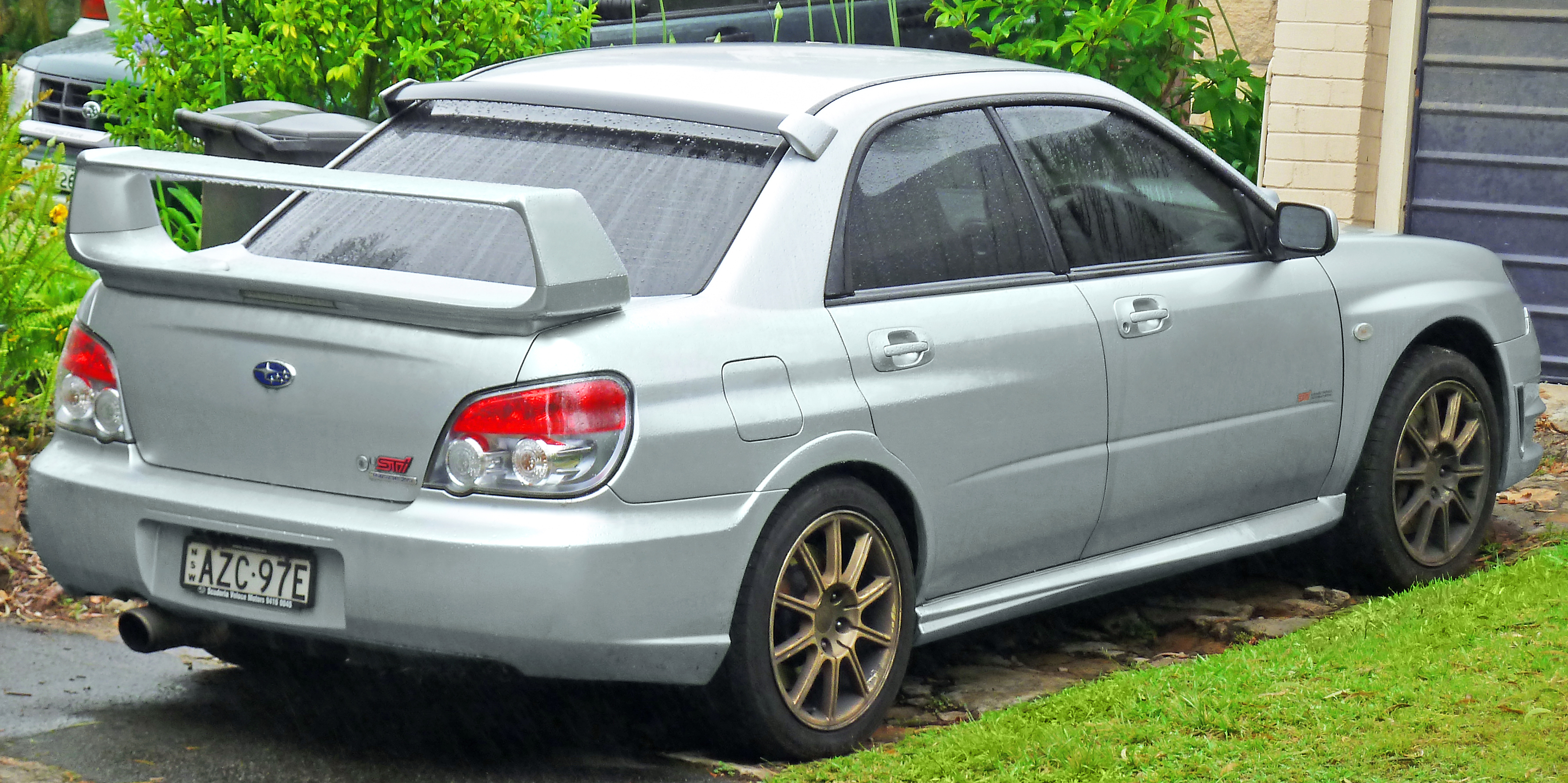
WRX STI sedan (second facelift)

==== S202 ====
Subaru WRX STI (GD) S202/S203/S204 + RA-R
Image	Subaru Impreza S202, a high-performance variant of the standard Subaru Impreza WRX sedan. This photo shows the front of the car, which is yellow; there is a "S202" badge on the front grille.	Subaru Impreza S203, a high-performance variant of the standard Subaru Impreza sedan. This photo shows the front of the car, which is white; there is a "S203" badge on the front grille.		Subaru Impreza WRX STI spec C Type RA-R, a high-performance variant of the standard Subaru Impreza sedan. This photo shows the front of the car, which is yellow with white wheels.
Model	S202	S203	S204	Spec C Type RA-R
Units	400	555	600	300
Engine	EJ207			
Output	235 kW; 320 PS; 315 hp @6400			
Output	384 N⋅m; 283 lbf⋅ft @4400	422 N⋅m; 311 lbf⋅ft @4400	432 N⋅m; 319 lbf⋅ft @4400	

The S202, produced in 2002, was based on the WRX STI type RA spec C; STI fitted an upgraded intake and exhaust system to increase maximum engine output to 235 kW (320 PS; 315 hp) at 6400 rpm and 384 N⋅m (283 lbf⋅ft) at 4400 rpm. Weight was slightly reduced to 1,330 kg (2,930 lb) and production was limited to 400 units.

==== S203 ====
The S203, produced in 2004 and sporting the first restyled front end, was fitted with a larger turbo to increase maximum engine output. Subaru Team driver Petter Solberg helped to develop the S203. Compared to the S202, power remained unchanged at 235 kW (320 PS; 315 hp) at 6400 rpm, but torque increased to 422 N⋅m (311 lbf⋅ft) at 4400 rpm. Weight also increased to 1,445 kg (3,186 lb) and production was limited to 555 units.

==== WRX STI S20-SC ====
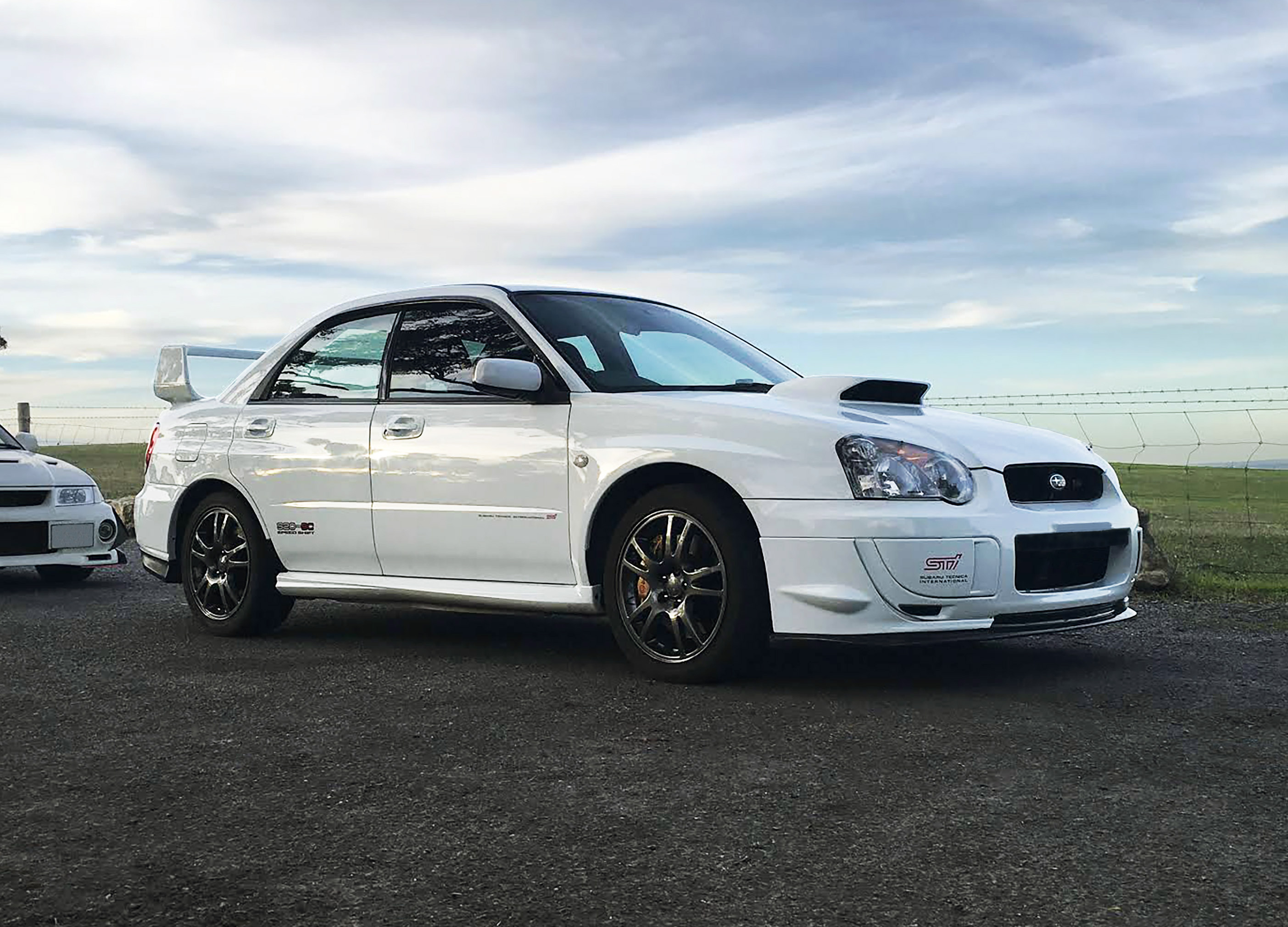
Subaru Impreza WRX STI S20-SC

The WRX STI S20-SC (Speed Shift 2.0 Litre S-Car) is a Limited Edition classified S-Car sold only in Subaru Docklands, Melbourne, Australia. As most S-Cars were sold to the Japanese Domestic Market the S20 SC was limited in production to just 10 cars for Australia. The S20 SC was offered only in (51E) white and included all available WRX STI Version 8 extras, modifications to performance and additional cosmetic changes.

Subaru Australia utilised the 10 vehicles to showcase the catalogue options available to the standard STI. These included but not limited to; STI sway bars, fog lamp “delete” for further weight reduction, STI headlight covers, optional additional cosmetic STI badging etc. all of which came standard to the S20 SC. Additional to the catalogue promoted STI parts, the S20 SC exclusive modifications include; STI struts, lowered springs, a short shifter mechanism with exclusive gear knob, STI braided brake lines, black wheels, unique interior (B20) blue/black, various external badging, ECU tweaks and a build number plaque stating the build number.

==== S204 ====
The S204, produced in 2005 with the second restyling, also was fitted with a larger turbo to increase maximum engine output and the engine was hand-assembled. Compared to the S202 and S203, power remained unchanged at 235 kW (320 PS; 315 hp) at 6400 rpm, but torque increased to 432 N⋅m (319 lbf⋅ft) at 4400 rpm. Weight also increased to 1,450 kg (3,200 lb) and production was limited to 600 units.

==== Spec C Type RA-R ====
The Spec C Type RA-R was derived from the S204 with additional measures to lighten the car. The same engine and output were fitted, but weight was reduced to 1,390 kg (3,060 lb). Of the 300 cars produced, a sub-edition of 50 was limited to the Astral Yellow color.

== Third generation (GE, GH, GR, GV; 2007) ==
Third generation
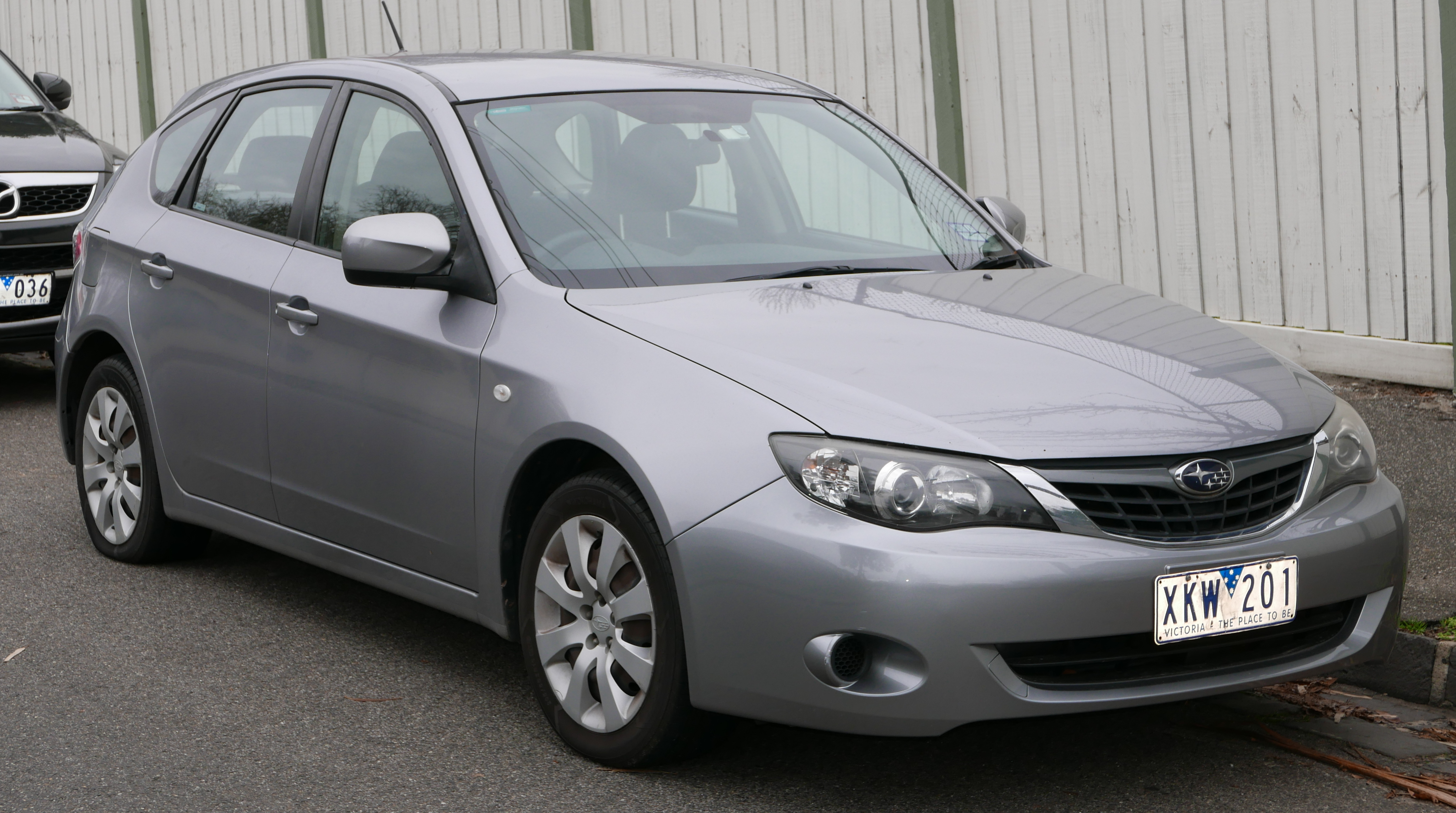
- Pre-facelift hatchback

Overview
- Model code: GE (sedan, narrow body); GH (hatchback, narrow body); GR (hatchback, wide body); GV (sedan, wide body)
- Also called: Subaru Outback Sport; Subaru Impreza B3 (Israel); Subaru Impreza Anesis
- Production: 2007–2011; 2007–2014 (WRX)
- Model years: 2008–2011; 2008–2014 (WRX)
- Assembly: Japan: Ōta, Gunma

Body and chassis
- Body style: 4-door sedan 5-door hatchback

Powertrain
- Engine: Gasoline: 1.5 L EL15 H4; 2.0 L EJ20 H4; 2.0 L EJ20 turbo H4; 2.5 L EJ25 H4; 2.5 L EJ25 H4-T; Diesel: 2.0 L EE20 turbo H4
- Transmission: 4-speed automatic 5-speed automatic 5-speed manual 6-speed TY856UB1KA manual

Dimensions
- Wheelbase: 2,620 mm (103.1 in)
- Length: Sedan: 4,580 mm (180.3 in); Hatchback: 4,415 mm (173.8 in)
- Width: 1,740 mm (68.5 in); WRX STI: 1,795 mm (70.7 in)
- Height: 1,475 mm (58.1 in); Outback Sport: 1,481 mm (58.3 in)
- Curb weight: 1,394 kg (3,073 lb)

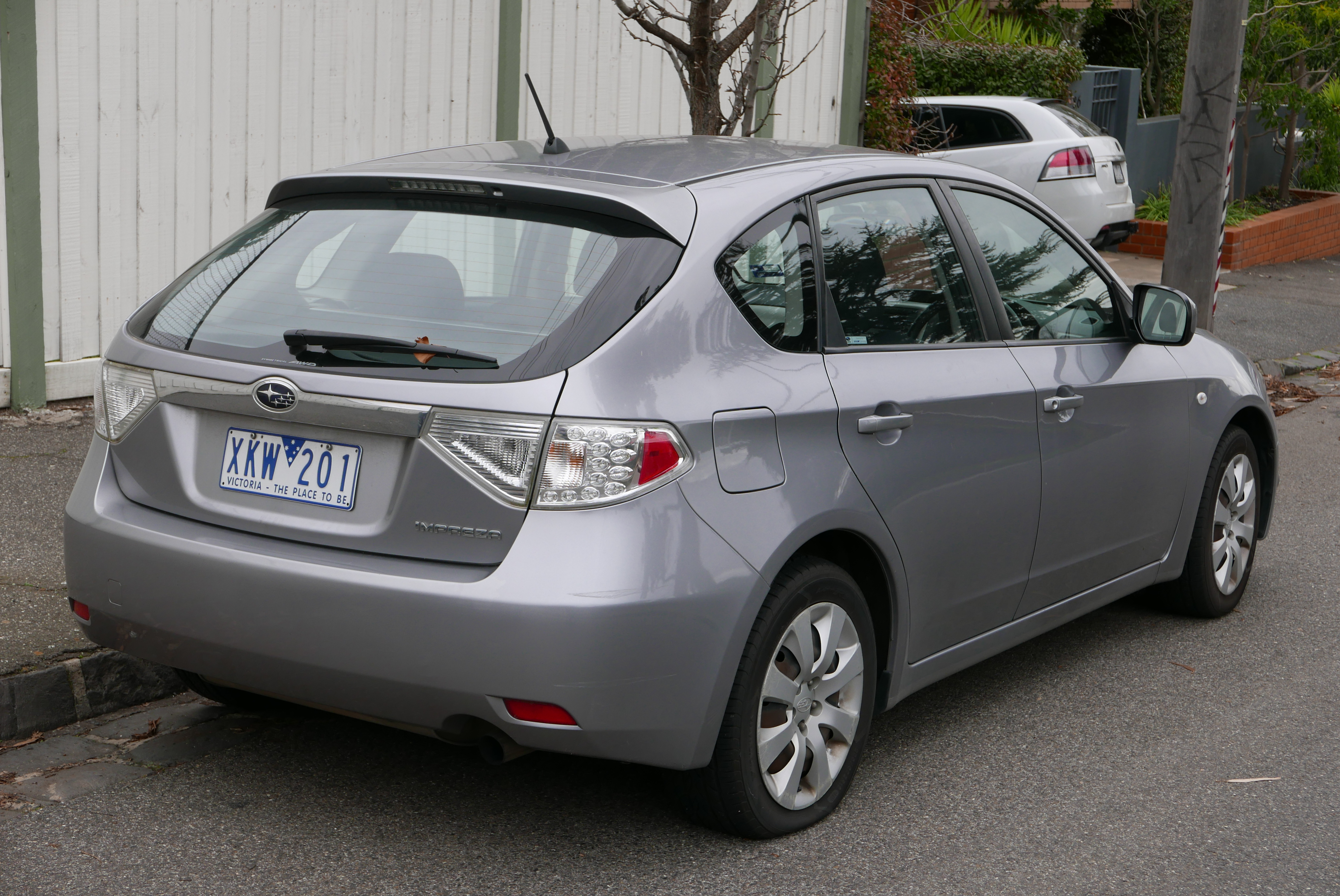
Hatchback (pre-facelift)

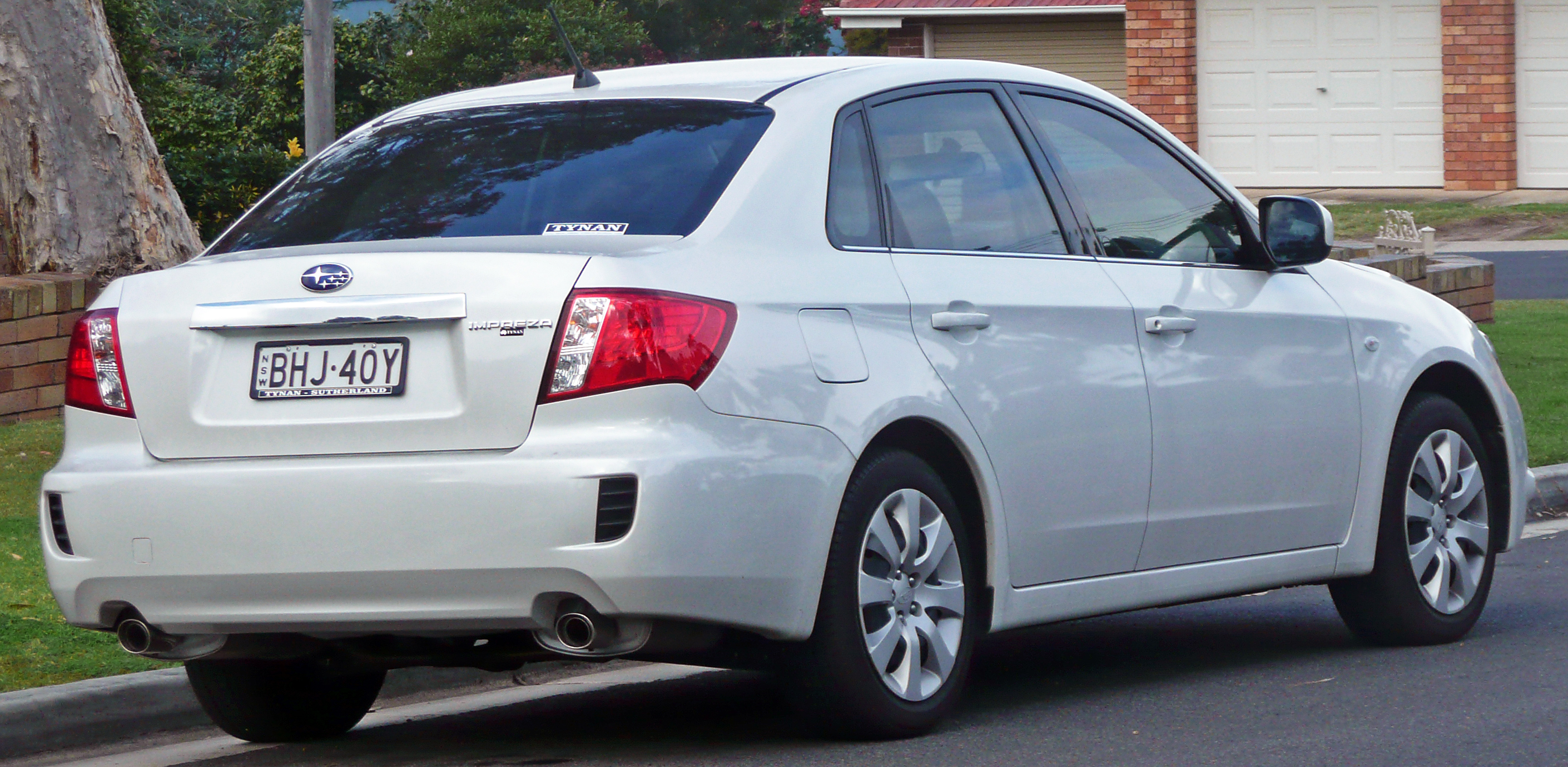
Sedan (pre-facelift)

Subaru revealed the third-generation Impreza at the New York Auto Show on 2 April 2007—both the standard naturally aspirated Impreza and turbocharged WRX versions were revealed. The third generation of the high performance WRX STI debuted in October 2007. This generation also saw the discontinuation of the wagon, replaced by a new 5-door hatchback body style. The wide-body variants of the hatchback and sedan are internally labelled GR and GV, respectively. Dimensionally, this version is wider by 55 mm (2.2 in) and increases track by approximately 38 millimetres (1.5 in) to 1,530 / 1,540 mm (60.2 / 60.6 in) (F/R). Although first adopted by the STI, the wide-body platform was later utilized by the standard WRX range.

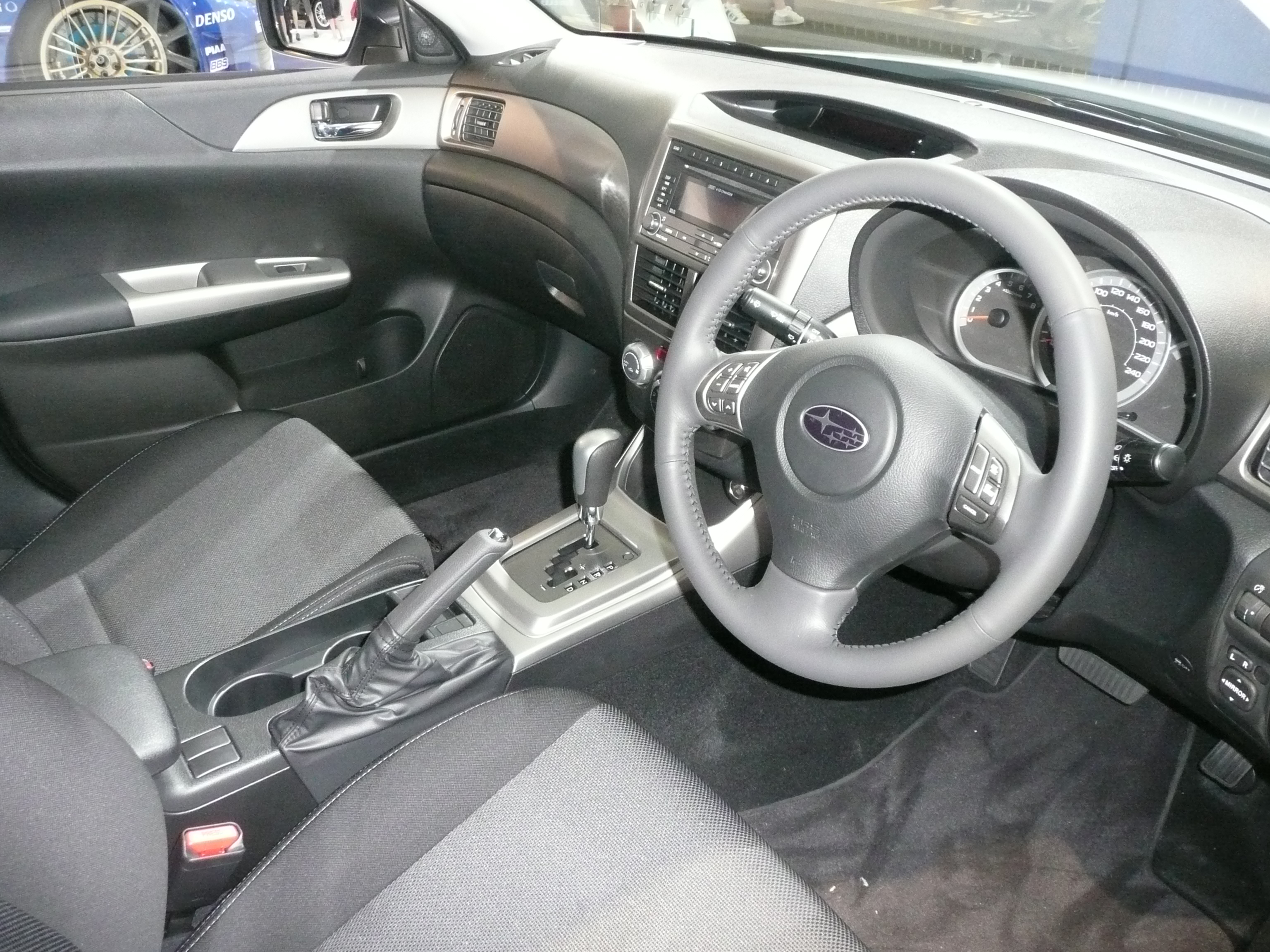
Interior

The third series of the Impreza is slightly longer, wider and offers a longer wheelbase. Two Subaru traditions were discontinued with the new model: the parking light switch atop the steering column is no longer present, and for the first time the windows have frames to improve noise, vibration, and harshness levels. Subaru made an effort to control the weight of the new chassis. Despite the increase in size, stiffness, and safety equipment, the car's weight is similar to the previous generation. The front suspension uses a MacPherson strut setup, while the rear features a new double wishbone suspension.

Flat-four gasoline engines in the naturally aspirated tune comprised a 1.5-liter EL15 producing 80 kW (107 hp), the 2.0-liter EJ20 with 110 kW (148 hp) and 196 N⋅m (145 lb⋅ft), and the 2.5-liter EJ25 with 127 kW (170 hp). Turbocharged versions of the two latter engines were fitted to the WRX and WRX STI versions as discussed later. Subaru introduced a flat-four diesel engine, designated EE20 at the 2008 Paris Motor Show. Sales began in several European countries from early 2009, with the 2.0-liter turbo diesel engine of 112 kW (150 hp). Two models are available as of July 2009, 2.0 TD and 2.0 TD Sport.

In the Japanese domestic market the range comprised the 1.5-liter 15S, plus the 2.0-liter 20S and turbocharged S-GT, both using the 2.0-liter engine. Japanese dealers retailed the hatchback initially, with the sedan body variant arriving in late 2008 as the Impreza Anesis. This generation represented the first time that the Impreza was no longer in compliance with Japanese government regulations concerning exterior dimensions. Japanese specification models are fitted with an engine start button.

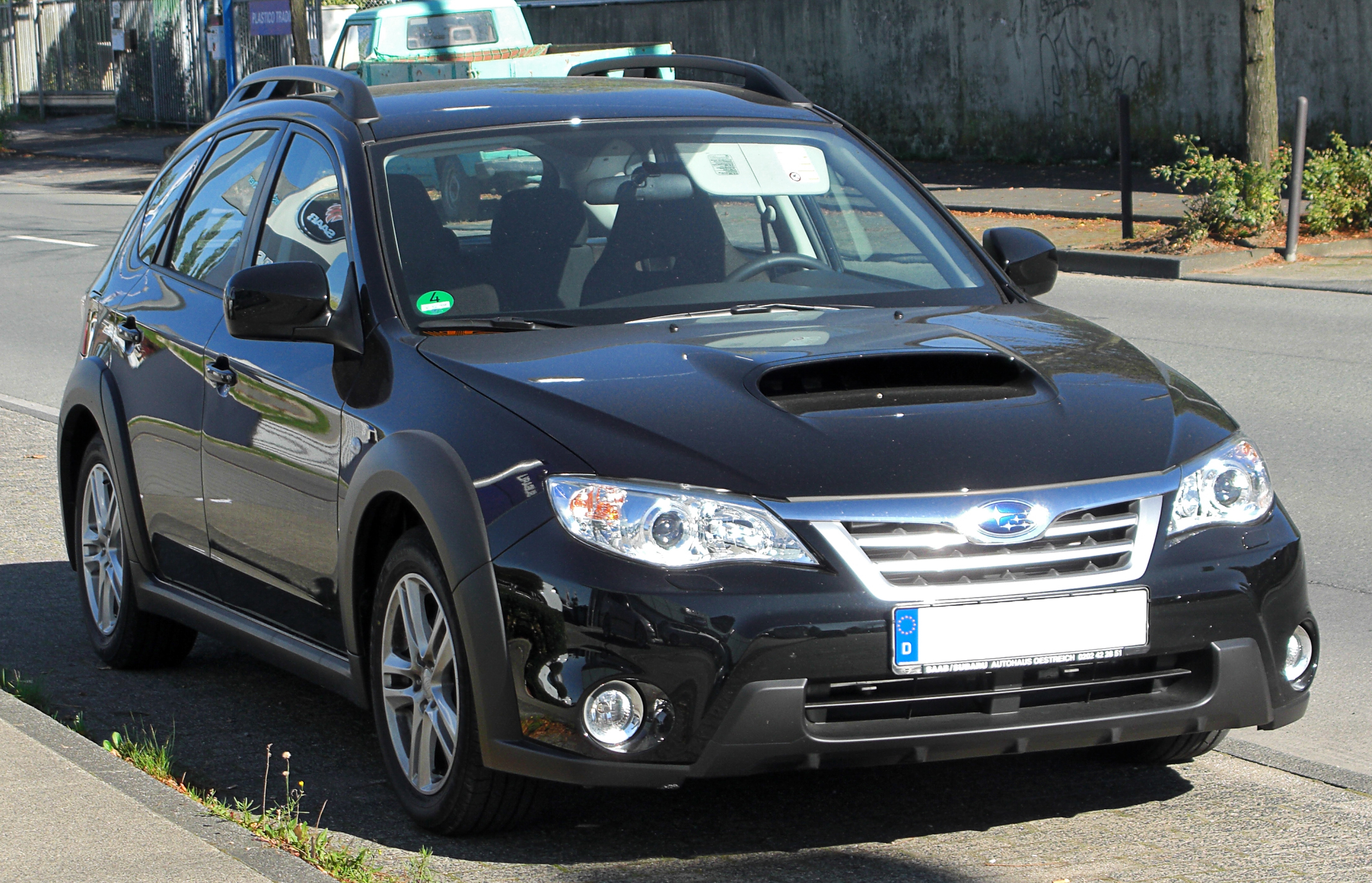
Subaru Impreza XV

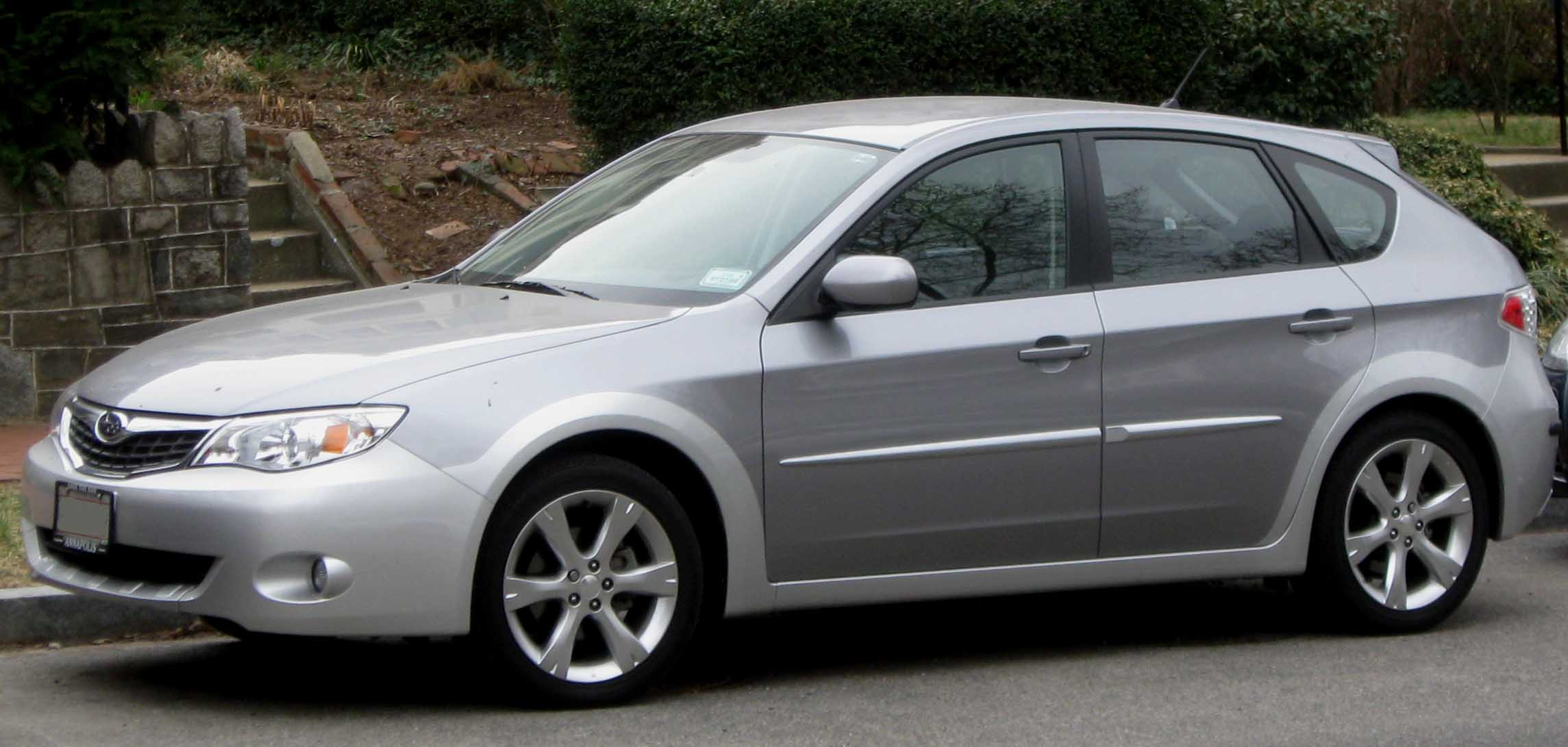
Subaru Impreza Outback Sport

Subaru Australia released the third generation hatchback in September 2007. Naturally aspirated 2.0-liter versions fell under the R, RX and RS trims, with the turbocharged 2.5-liter reserved for the WRX. The sedan body style came later in 2008, paralleling the hatchbacks's model range.

North America received only the 2.5-liter models. Released to the United States market for the 2008 model year, the model range consists of the 2.5i, the turbocharged WRX, and the Outback Sport that Subaru marketed as a separate model line. The naturally aspirated models are electronically limited from surpassing 190 km/h (120 mph). For 2009, a new 2.5i GT trim arrived to the market with the turbocharged 167 kW; 227 PS (224 hp) engine from the 2008 model WRX (this 2009 WRX received a boost in power). While automatic transmission was not available with the WRX, the 2.5i GT did gain an optional four-speed automatic. In the Canadian market, the base Impreza 2.5i received upgrades for the 2009 model year, including rear disc brakes, electronic stability control, and body-colored door handles—features previously only found on the 2.5i Sport and more expensive trims.

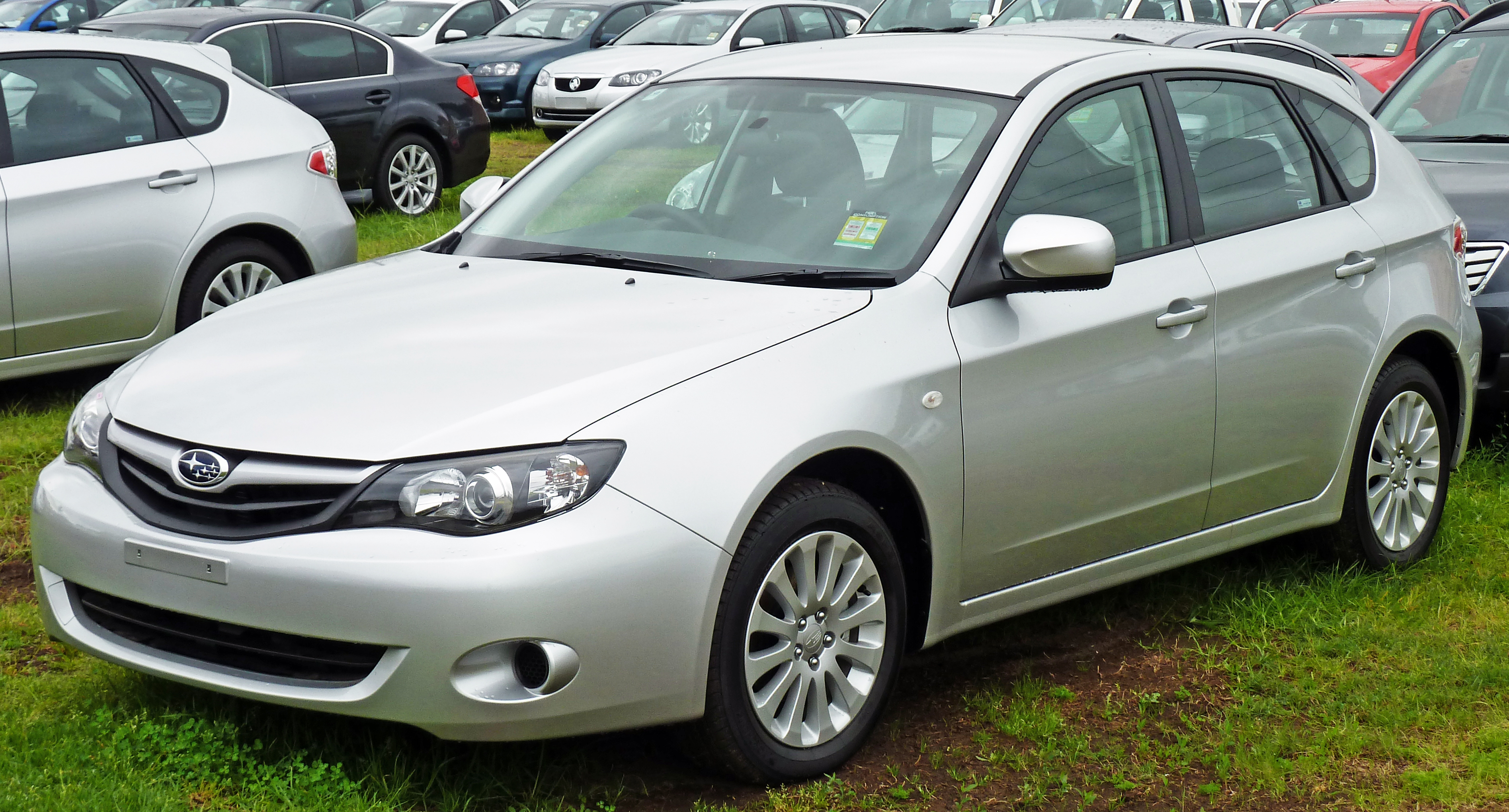

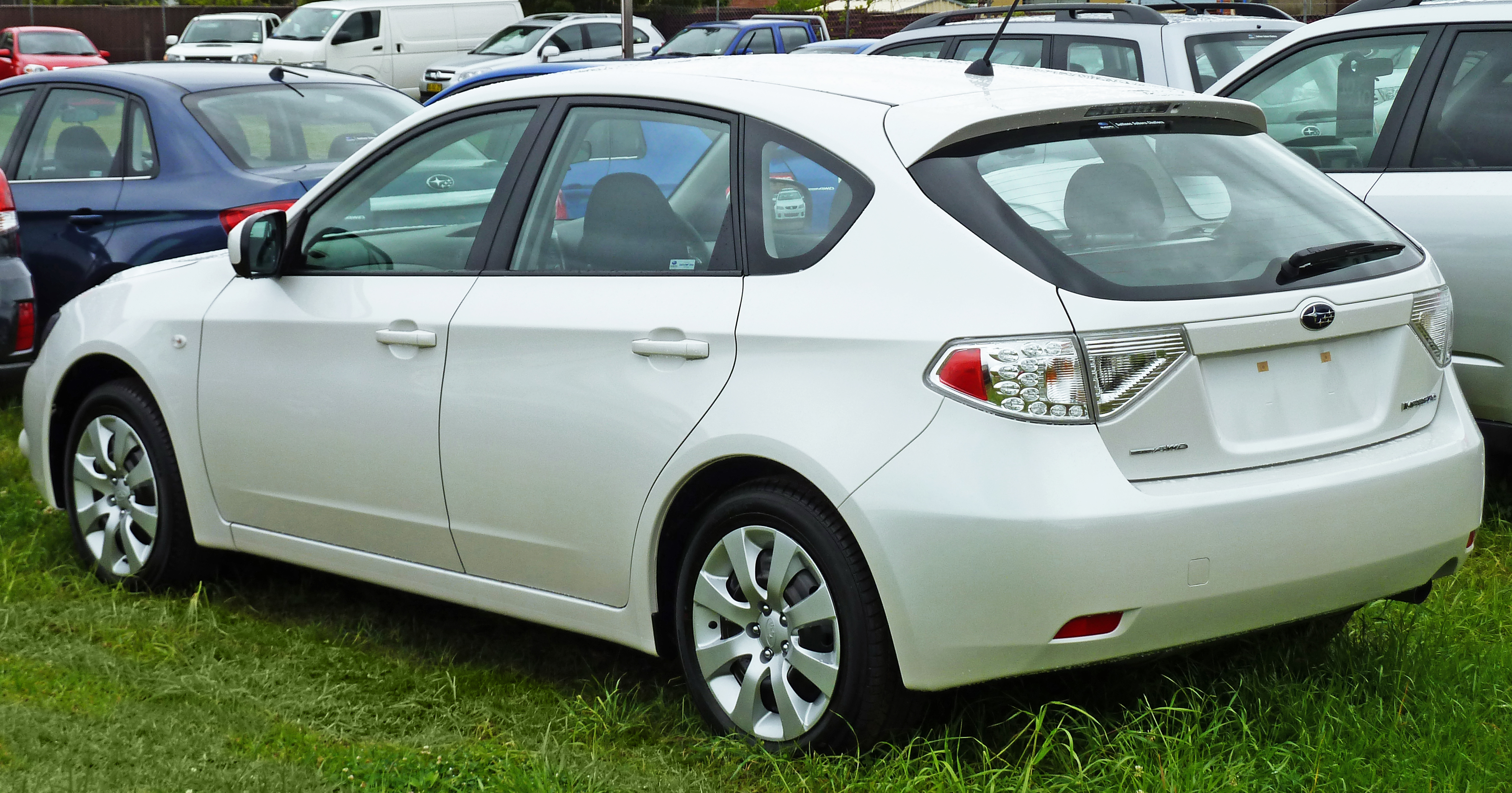
Hatchback (facelift)

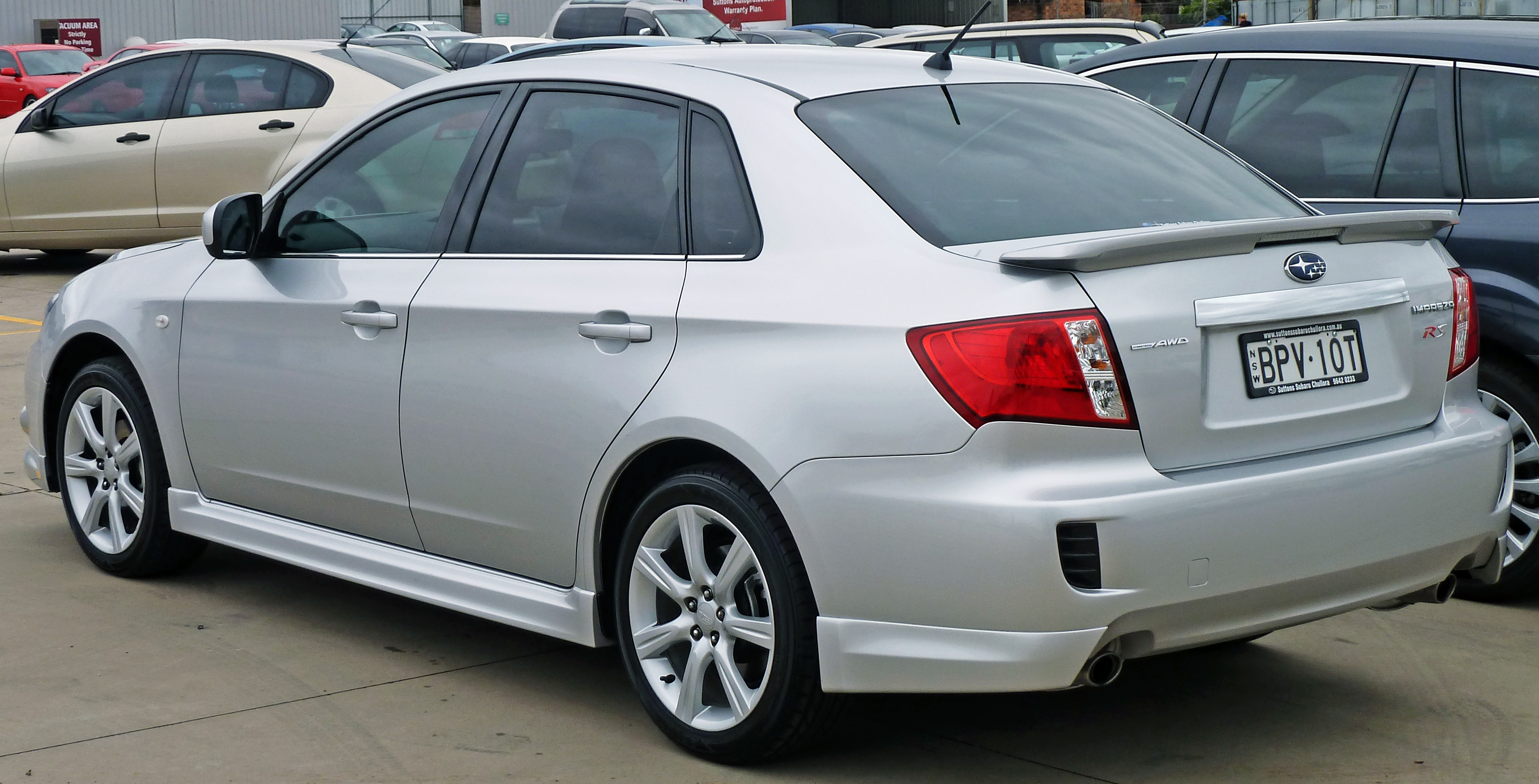
Sedan (facelift)

In Israel, the Impreza is denoted as the B3, and three styles are offered: the B3 1.5, with a 1.5-liter engine, the B3 2.0 and the B3 2.0 Sport, both with the 2.0-liter engine. Four-door and five-door models are available for each engine type, ranging from the basic R class, to the medium RX and top RXI class.

Indonesian-specification versions were initially only available as the hatchback style, with the sedan arriving in 2011. The 1.5 R and 2.0 R could be ordered with a dual-range five-speed manual, or four-speed automatic transmission. However, in Singapore and Thailand, the Impreza 1.5 R, 2.0 R, and 2.5 WRX are also offered as four-door sedan. The WRX STI trim in Singapore, Indonesia, Thailand and the Philippines can be ordered with the dual-range six-speed manual, or five-speed automatic if the WRX STI A-Line is available.

Safety of the car has been increased with range wide inclusion of electronic stability control as standard in many markets. When the Insurance Institute for Highway Safety (IIHS) in the US crash-tested the five-door Impreza, the organization granted the Impreza the highest ranking available. ANCAP in Australia tested the Impreza where it scored 34.66 out of 37 points, or the full five-star rating in the occupant safety crash test; the Impreza also scored a four-star pedestrian safety test.

The Impreza range received a facelift in late 2009 for the 2010 model year, gaining a new grille insert.

=== WRX ===
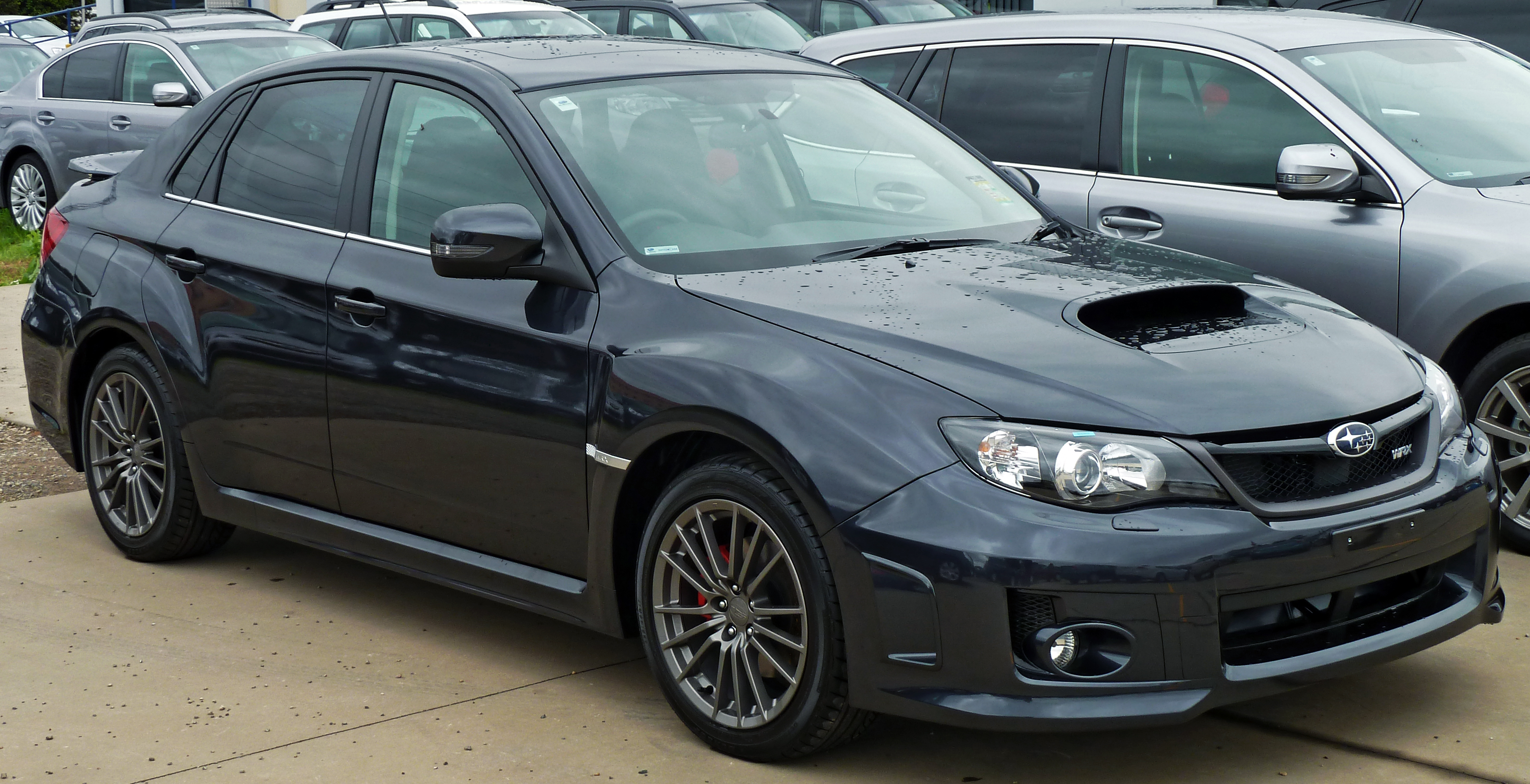

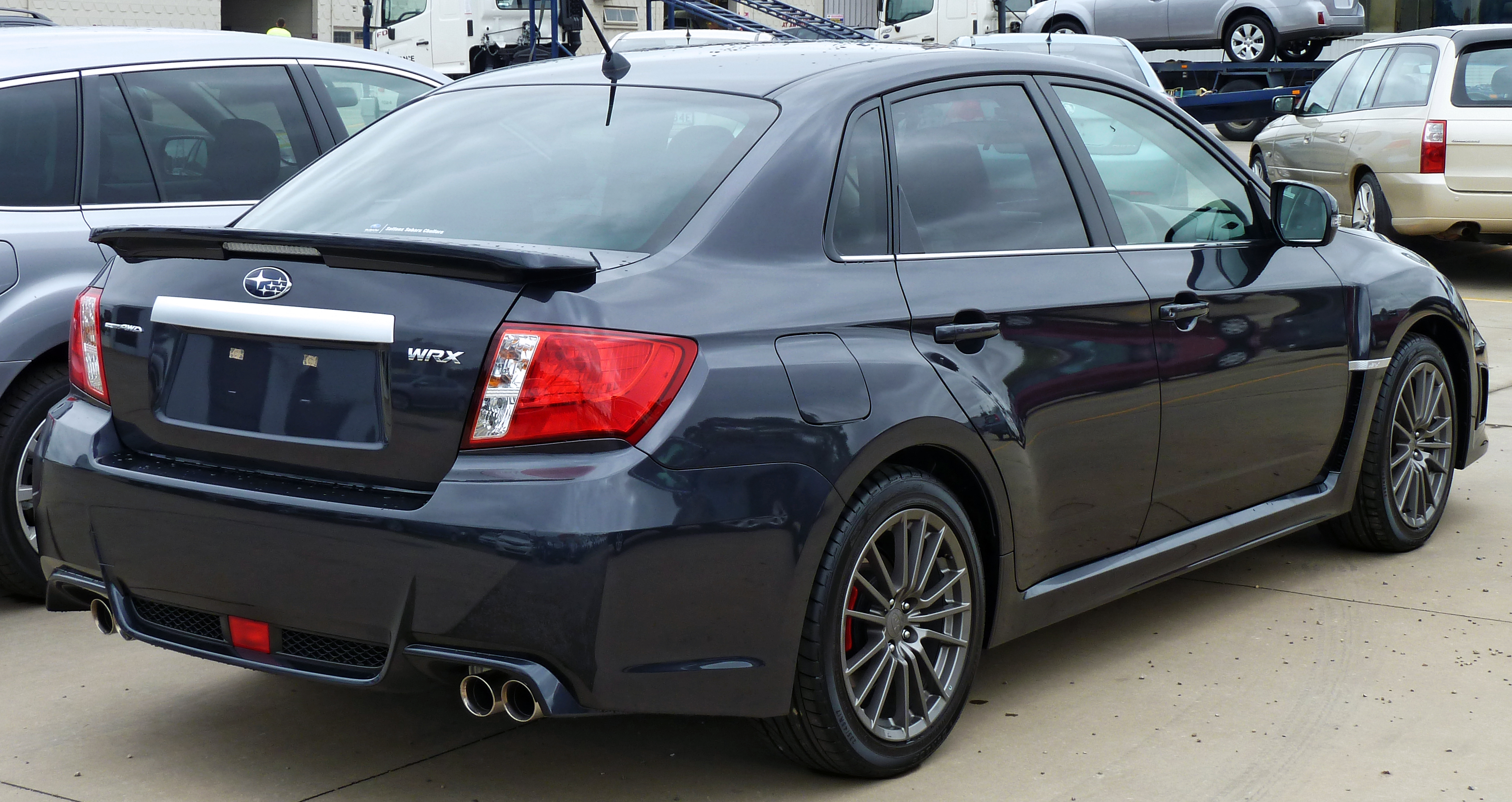
Subaru Impreza WRX sedan (facelift)

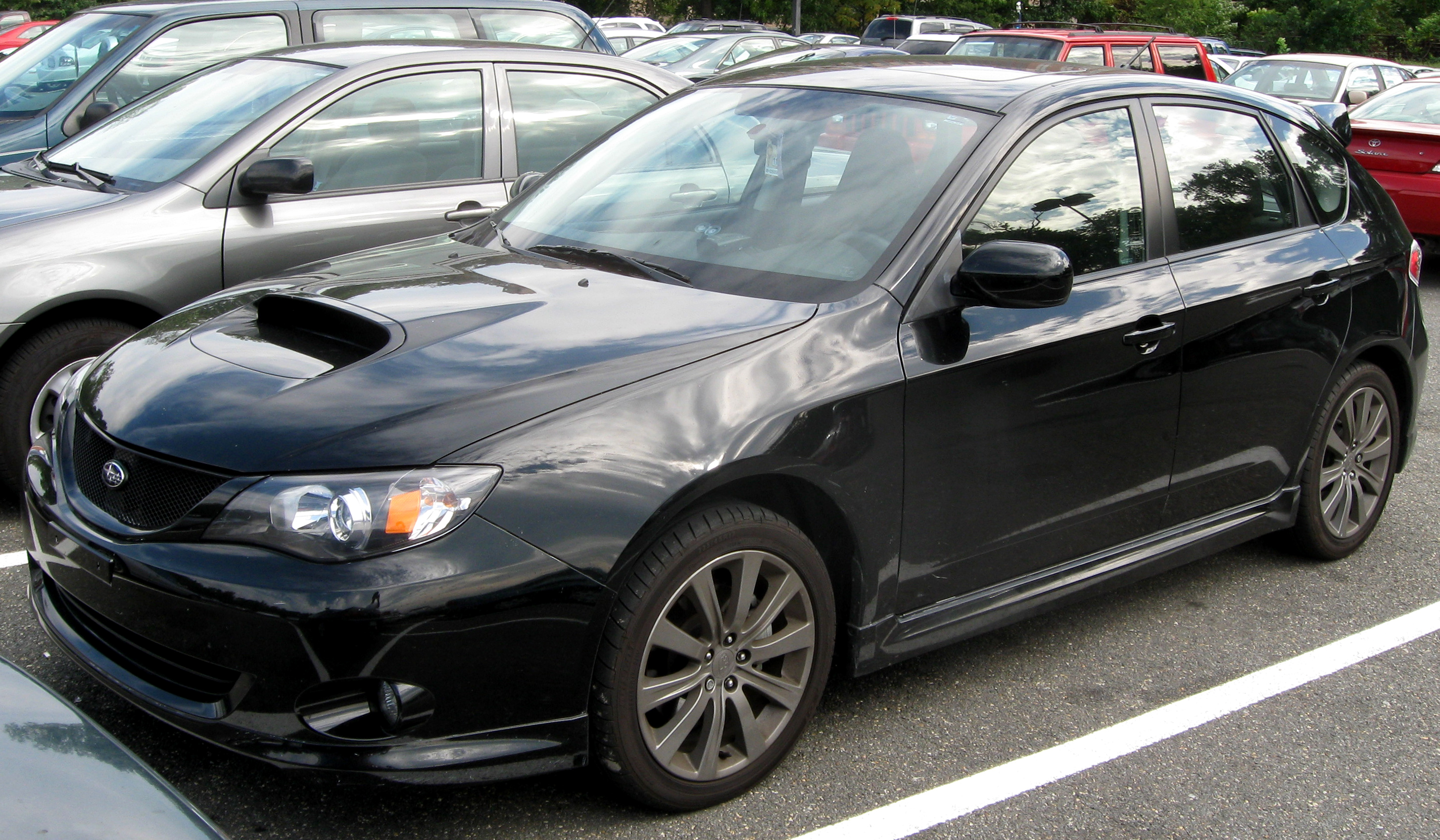
Subaru Impreza WRX hatchback (pre-facelift)

Subaru debuted the turbocharged WRX performance variant of the third generation series alongside the mainstream naturally aspirated models on 2 April 2007. For this generation, most markets adopted the abbreviated name "WRX", although the Japanese, North American and UK markets retained the full "Subaru Impreza WRX" title. The 2.5-liter EJ255 engine is largely unchanged internally. The main change is the airflow efficiency of the heads. Changes in the engine compartment consist primarily of a fourth-generation Legacy GT style intake manifold and intercooler. The TD04 turbo remains from the previous generation; however, it has been adjusted to fit the new intake design. Power output consists of 169 kW (227 hp) and 320 N⋅m (236 lb⋅ft) from its 2.5-liter engine. It was offered in either a five-speed manual, or four-speed automatic. The five-speed manual transmission was changed to the same found in the fourth-generation Legacy GT. The rear limited-slip differential has been discarded in exchange for the new VDC (Vehicle Dynamics Control) system. The weight of the car also has been reduced and gives the WRX a 0 to 100 km/h (0 to 62 mph) time of 5.8 seconds. In contrast, curb weight of the standard Impreza model is around 27.2 kg (60 lb) heavier. For the US market, the WRX was offered in "base", Premium, and Limited trim levels. In Australia, the WRX is available as a sedan or hatchback. An optional premium package adds the satellite navigation with DVD player and 7-inch screen, leather upholstery and a sunroof.

In response to criticism that the third-generation WRX suspension is too soft, as well as needing to stay competitive with rival releases, Subaru issued several changes in 2008 for the 2009 model year, known in the UK as the WRX-S. The EJ255 engine received an output boost to 198 kW (265 hp) and 331 N⋅m (244 lb⋅ft) of torque by swapping the previous TD04 turbocharger to an IHI VF52. This led to the car now achieving a 0–60 mph (0–97 km/h) time of 4.7 seconds, as tested by Car and Driver. In addition, the updated model received altered springs/struts, sway bars, and Dunlop summer tires to improve handling. Exterior cosmetic changes included the 2008 WRX Premium aero package, STi spoiler (Hatchback only), updated grille with WRX badge, and darker Gunmetal colored wheels as standard equipment. Interior changes consisted of aluminum pedals, silver trim around the shifter, red stitching on the shift boot and seats, and a red WRX logo embroidered on the driver and passenger seat.

Further changes in 2010 (for the 2011 model year) saw the WRX gain the wide-body shell from the STI, as well as the addition of quad muffler tips with diffuser. The new model gains 15 kg (33 lb). Firmer rear sub-frame bushings and wider 17-inch wheels contribute to improved traction.

=== WRX STI ===
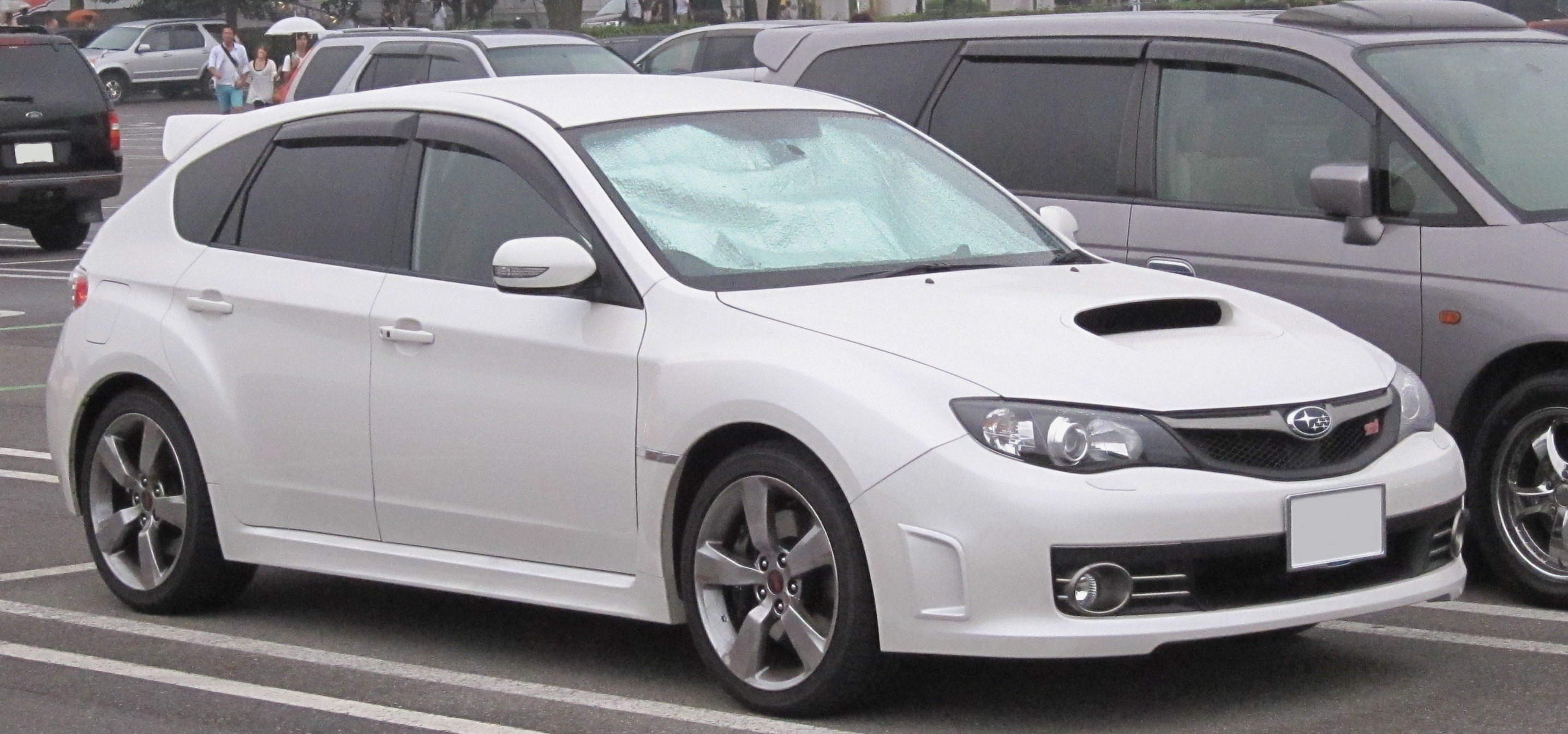

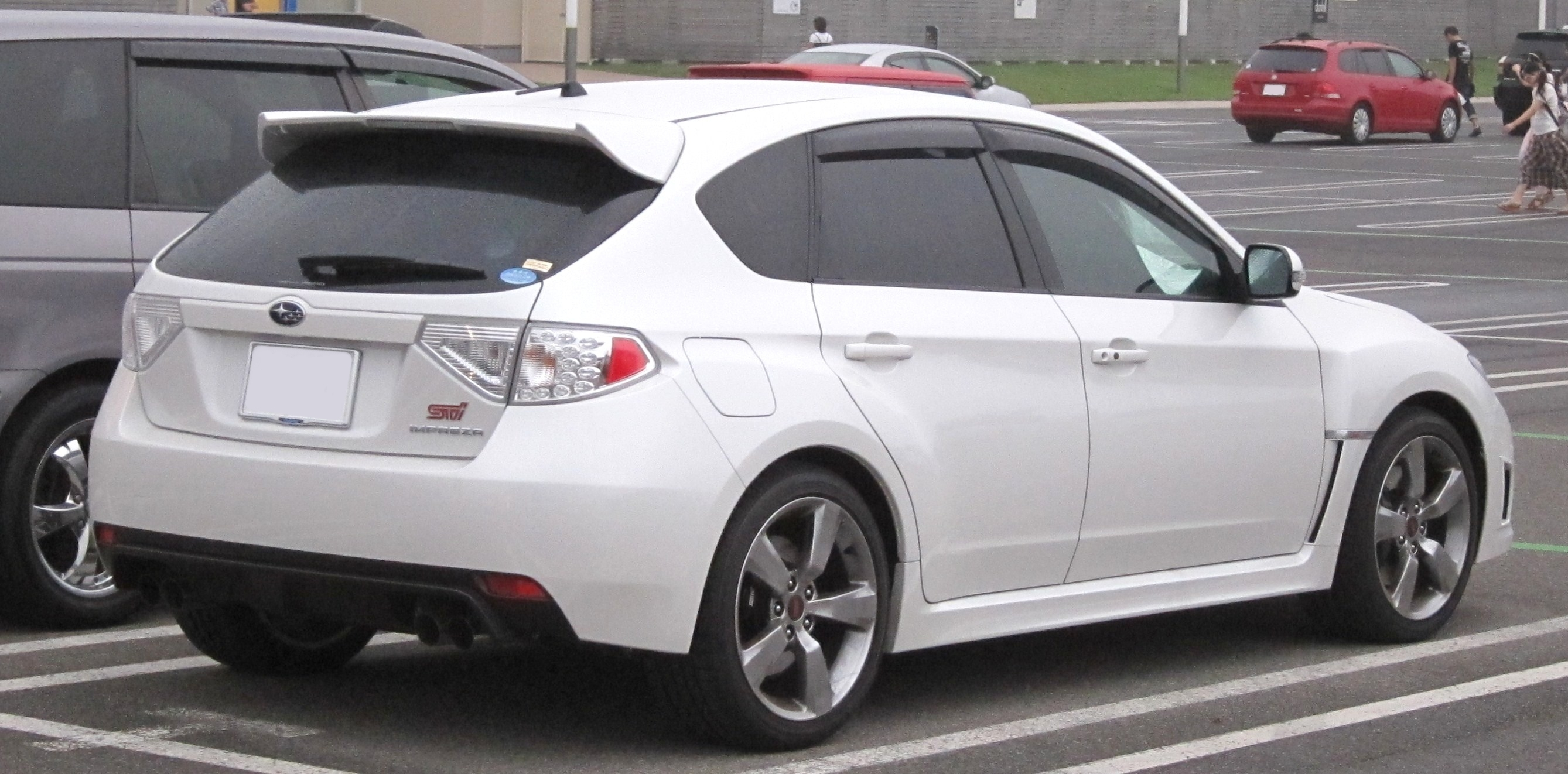
Subaru Impreza WRX STI hatchback (pre-facelift)

Debuting at the Tokyo Auto Show in October 2007, WRX STI versions build further on the standard WRX cars. The STI available in Japan is fitted with the 2.0-liter EJ207 engine with twin scroll turbocharger generating 227 kW (308 PS) at 6,500 rpm and 422 N⋅m (311 lb⋅ft) of torque at 4,400 rpm. Export markets receive the higher-displacement 2.5-liter EJ257 unit with the single-scroll VF48 turbocharger rated at 221 kW (300 PS) and 407 N⋅m (300 lb⋅ft) of torque. The turbocharger directs air through a larger top-mount intercooler which has lost the red "STI" that was on previous generations. The STI (3,395 lbs) is heavier than the WRX (3,174- 3,240 lbs depending on trim) due to a more robust transmission, rear differential and other chassis reinforcements.

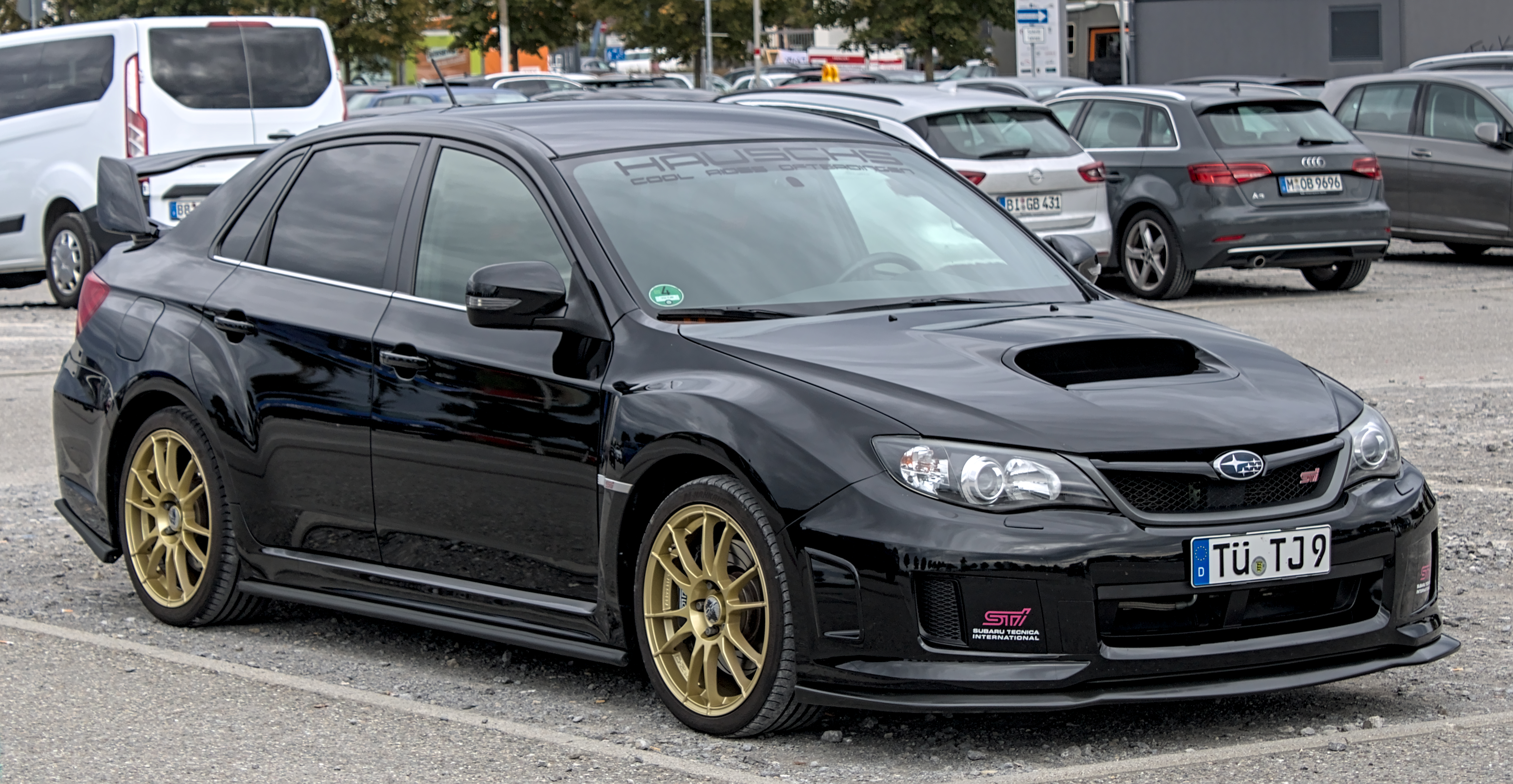

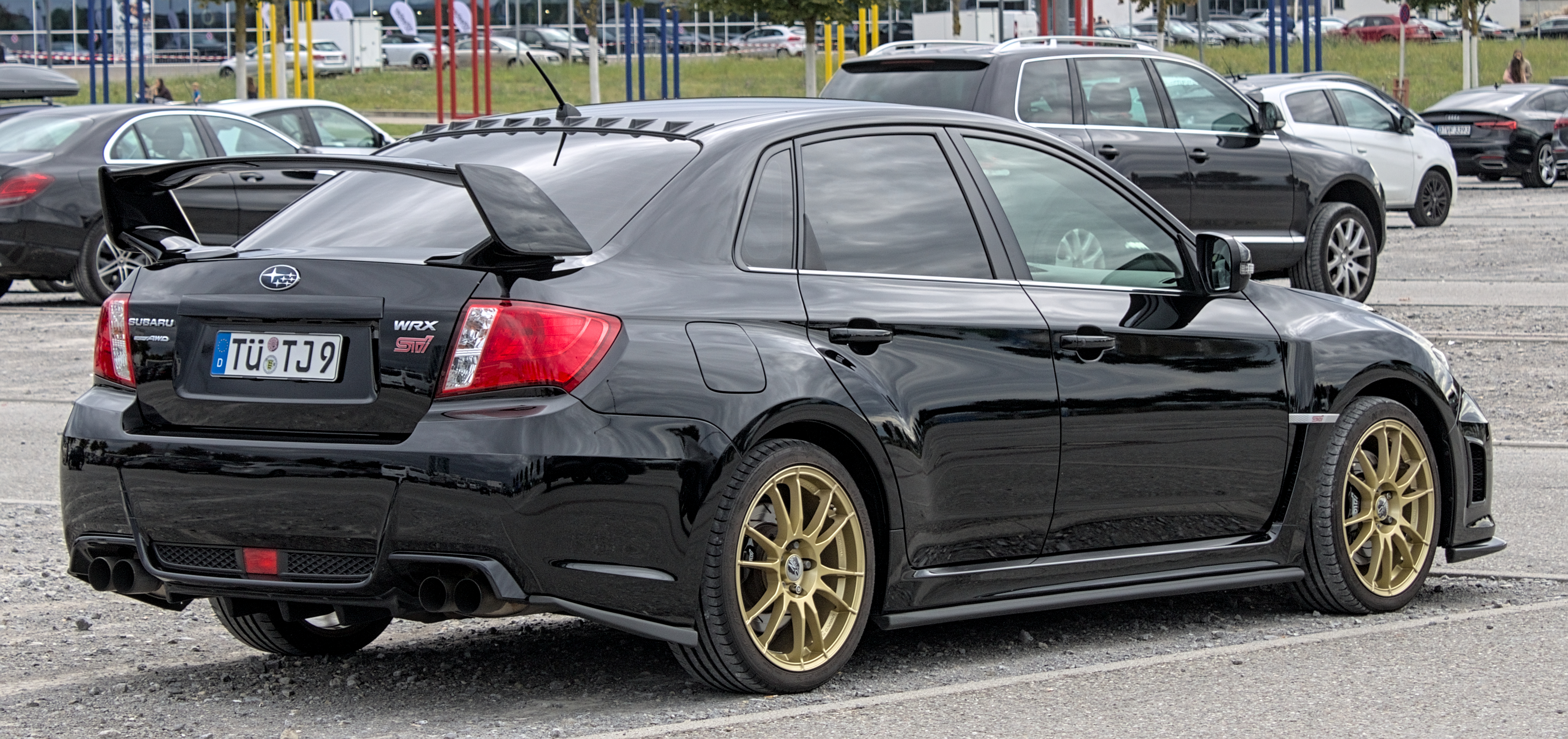
Subaru Impreza WRX STI GV sedan (facelift)

Like the standard WRX, the third-generation model was shortened to "Subaru WRX STI", with the Japanese markets notably abstaining from this convention. To differentiate the STI from the regular WRX, Subaru opted to manufacture the STI with a wider body and therefore track—as noted by the flared wheel arches. Furthermore, Subaru utilized aluminum suspension components for the STI. Electronic modifications include a multi-mode electronic stability control with "normal", "traction", and "off" modes; Subaru Intelligent-Drive (SI-Drive) with three modes: "intelligent", "sport", and "sport sharp"; and multi-mode driver controlled center differential (DCCD). The DCCD is a combined mechanical and solenoid operated limited-slip differential which enables the driver to switch between manual and automated center differential locking. The locking strength can vary from fully open to fully locked with a 41/59 front/rear open torque bias.

The STI hatchback was released in the United States in March 2008.

A Subaru Impreza WRX STI Group R4 was entered in the 2012 FIA Asia-Pacific Rally.

In 2010 for the 2011 model year, the WRX STI became available as a four-door. The most noticeable feature on the STI sedan is a large rear spoiler. Australia also received the 2011 model year STI as a sedan to complement the hatchback released in 2008. Australian STIs were offered in standard form, plus the STI spec.R. An electric sunroof, leather upholstery, satellite navigation, and BBS wheels are standard on the spec.R, while Recaro seats are optional.

A facelift of the STI arrived in 2010 for the 2011 model year, distinguished by a new front bumper. Tweaks to the suspension—stiffer springs, larger anti-roll bars, new pillow ball bushings on the front lower arms, as well as wider standard tires—had the effect of improved handling.

==== Subaru WRX STI Takumi (2008) ====
It is a concept vehicle based on the Impreza WRX STI hatchback with upgraded springs and shocks, revised suspension bits, lightweight 12-spoke wheels, undisclosed engine tweaks and a slightly reworked exterior.

The vehicle was unveiled in Motorsport Japan 2008.

==== 20th Anniversary Edition WRX STI (2008) ====
It is a limited (300 units) version of the Impreza WRX STI hatchback for the Japanese market, with a new set of coilovers with retuned springs and shocks, thicker front and rear anti-roll bars, 18-inch aluminum wheels, white body color, black lip spoiler, Recaro leather seats with red stitching, a commemorative plaque on the center console, new set of door sills.

==== WRX STI spec C (2009) ====
It is a limited (900 units) version of the Impreza WRX STI for the Japanese market. It included engine, suspension, and body parts improvement over the regular model. The ball bearing on the turbine axle was modified to reduce friction, the ECU retuned for better response, and an intercooler water spray fitted. The cross member, suspension and power steering were also improved for better handling and body rigidity. An aluminum hood, laminar window glass, and a lighter battery helped to reduce weight.

==== WRX STI A-Line (2009) ====
It is a version of the WRX STI with a five-speed semi-automatic, steering wheel-mounted paddle shifter. The vehicle went on sale initially in Japan and Singapore, and later also in Hong Kong, and later in Thailand, Indonesia, and Australia in 2011.

==== WRX STI 330S / WRX STI Type UK, WRX STI 380S ====
They are versions of the Impreza WRX STI for the UK market, with specific tuning by Prodrive. The WRX STI 330S includes increased engine power to 330 PS (243 kW; 325 hp). The WRX STI 380S includes increased engine power to 380 PS (279 kW; 375 hp), new wheels, an upgraded body kit. The vehicles were unveiled at the British Motor Show.

Subaru announced, on 10 September 2008, that the 380S variation would not be produced, due to homologation and specification difficulties. However, the regular 330S model did enter production as the "WRX STI Type UK".

==== WRX STI R205 ====
The R205 was a complete car from STI; the "R" signifying the "road". Based on the Impreza WRX STI, the model utilised technology developed through STI's participation in the 24 Hours Nürburgring Race to the full. As the name implies, focus was given to the car's performance on public roads in its development in order to create the best road-going car possible. As for the engine, maximum output was increased to 235 kW (320 PS; 315 hp) at 6400 rpm and the maximum torque to 432 N⋅m (319 lbf⋅ft) at 4400 rpm by the introduction of such components as a special ball bearing twin scroll turbo. In addition, Brembo 13-inch discs and calipers were installed on the front and rear brakes. With regard to the exterior, aerodynamic devices including STI front and rear under spoilers were fitted. In order to further enhance the "flexible yet elegant driving feel" that STI aims for, a newly developed Flexible Draw Stiffener was installed along with STI dampers/springs and Flexible Tower Bar. As a result, the car could achieve exceptional vehicle maneuverability, which made the car react smoothly to the driver's intention. Production was limited to 400 units.

==== WRX STI Special Edition (MY 2010) ====
It is a version of the Impreza WRX STI for the North American market, similar to the Japanese STI Spec C. It included stiffer suspension and a thicker stabilizer bar for better handling, seven twin-spokes gray 18-inch alloy wheels, downgraded manual air conditioning, a four-speaker stereo instead of climate control and 10-speaker premium audio on the regular WRX STI.

==== WRX STI tS, WRX STI A-Line tS (2010) ====
It is a limited (400 units) version of the Impreza WRX STI sedan for the Japanese market.

==== Cosworth WRX STI CS400 ====
The Cosworth WRX STI CS400 is a limited (75 units) version of the Impreza WRX STI for the UK market. It includes a Cosworth-tuned version of the standard STI engine rated at 400 PS (294 kW; 395 hp), an upper mesh grille with piano black finish on the top frame, modified front bumper with "Cosworth" emblem on the lower mesh grille, 18-inch alloy wheels, lip front spoiler, rear waist spoiler, Bilstein struts, Eibach springs, AP Racing's larger diameter ventilated front brakes with six-piston calipers, Recaro leather seats with "Cosworth" label, piano black center console panel, "Cosworth"-badged floor mats.

The "Cosworth WRX STI CS400" was announced in late May 2010.

==== WRX STI S206, WRX STI S206 NBR CHALLENGE PACKAGE (2011–2012) ====
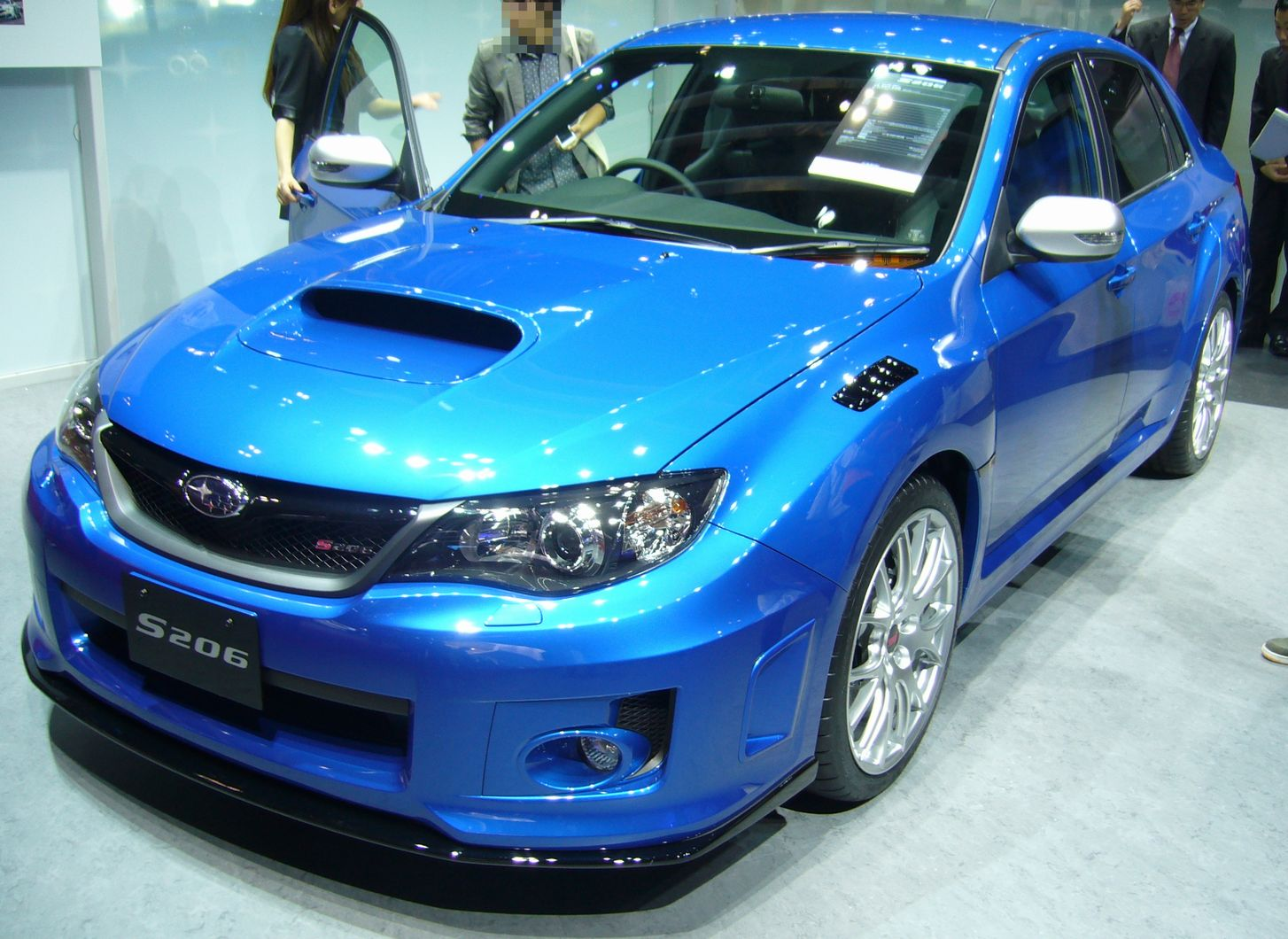
S206

It is a limited (300 units) version of the Impreza WRX STI sedan for the Japanese market. To commemorate the SP3T class win at the 2011 Nürburgring (NBR) 24-Hour Race, a limited "NBR CHALLENGE PACKAGE" was offered, limited to 100 units; this package included a carbon fiber roof and dry carbon rear wing. Compared to prior S-series limited production models (S202 / S203 / S204 / R205), power remained unchanged at 235 kW (320 PS; 315 hp) at 6400 rpm, but torque output was 431 N⋅m (318 lbf⋅ft) at 3200–4400 rpm. Weight also increased to 1,470 kg (3,240 lb).

==== WRX STI A-Line type S (2011) ====
It is a version of the Impreza WRX STI A-Line 4-door sedan and 5-door hatchback for the Japanese market.

==== Impreza G4 STI (concept; 2012) ====
It is a version of the Japanese model of the Subaru Impreza (4th Gen) G4 2.0i-S with: STI Front Under Spoiler, STI Sport Muffler (Prototype), STI Side Under Spoiler (Prototype), STI Flexible Tower Bar, STI Rear Trunk Spoiler (Prototype), STI Low Down Spring (Prototype), STI Skirt Lip, STI 18-inch Aluminum Wheel, (Prototype), STI Shift Knob – CVT (Prototype), STI Stainless Steel Mesh Brake Hose (Prototype). The vehicle was unveiled at the 2012 Tokyo Auto Salon.

==== Impreza WRX STI Group R4 (2012) ====
The Impreza WRX STI Group R4 is a race car version of the Subaru Impreza WRX STI sedan built for the Intercontinental Rally Challenge. The vehicle was unveiled at the 2012 Tokyo Auto Salon, and was also shown at the 2013 Tokyo Auto Salon.

==== WRX STI, WRX STI spec C, STI A-Line type S Package (2012) ====
Changes to Japanese models of the Impreza WRX STI sedan and 5-door hatchback include:

- New design 18-inch alloy wheels from the WRX STI, WRX STI A-Line
- available A-line equipment options including premium package (premium tan interior, BBS 18-inch forged alloy wheels) for 6-speed manual transmission models
- trunk garnish in body color (4-door sedan)

Changes to Japanese models of the Impreza WRX STI spec C included:

- 4-door sedan model available
- option deletions including rear wiper, fog lamp, large rear spoiler on 17-inch cars (4-door sedan)
- 17-inch cars include full auto air conditioning manufacturer option
- 17-inch cars include head rest and 3-point seat belt option at rear center seat

Change to Japanese models of the Impreza WRX STI A-Line type S Package include:

- Large rear spoiler (4-door sedan)
- exclusive bucket type front seat in Alcantara/leather, red stitching
- floor console lid and door arm rest in Alcantara
- BBS 18-inch forged alloy wheels
- Recaro bucket type front seat manufacturer option
- Brembo 17-inch front brake discs with 4-piston calipers, 2-piston rear calipers manufacturer option

The vehicles went on sale on 3 July 2012.

==== WRX STI tS Type RA, WRX STI tS Type RA NBR CHALLENGE PACKAGE (2013) ====
It is a limited (300 units) version of the Impreza WRX STI sedan for the Japanese market.

In 2010, the Impreza won the AMI Insurance performance car of the year award.

=== Safety ===
IIHS scores (2008)
Moderate overlap front (original test)	Good
Side (original test)	Good
Roof strength	Good
Head restraints and seats	Good

Euro NCAP test results* Subaru Impreza 2.0R (2009)
Test	Points	%
Overall:	4 /5 stars	
Adult occupant:	30.1	84%
Child occupant:	35.7	73%
Pedestrian:	25.7	72%
Safety assist:	4	57%

ANCAP test results* Subaru Impreza (2008)
Test	Score
Overall	5 /5 stars
Frontal offset	14.93/16
Side impact	15.73/16
Pole	2/2
Seat belt reminders	2/3
Whiplash protection	Not Assessed
Pedestrian protection	Good
Electronic stability control	Standard

== Fourth generation (GJ, GP; 2011) ==
Fourth generation
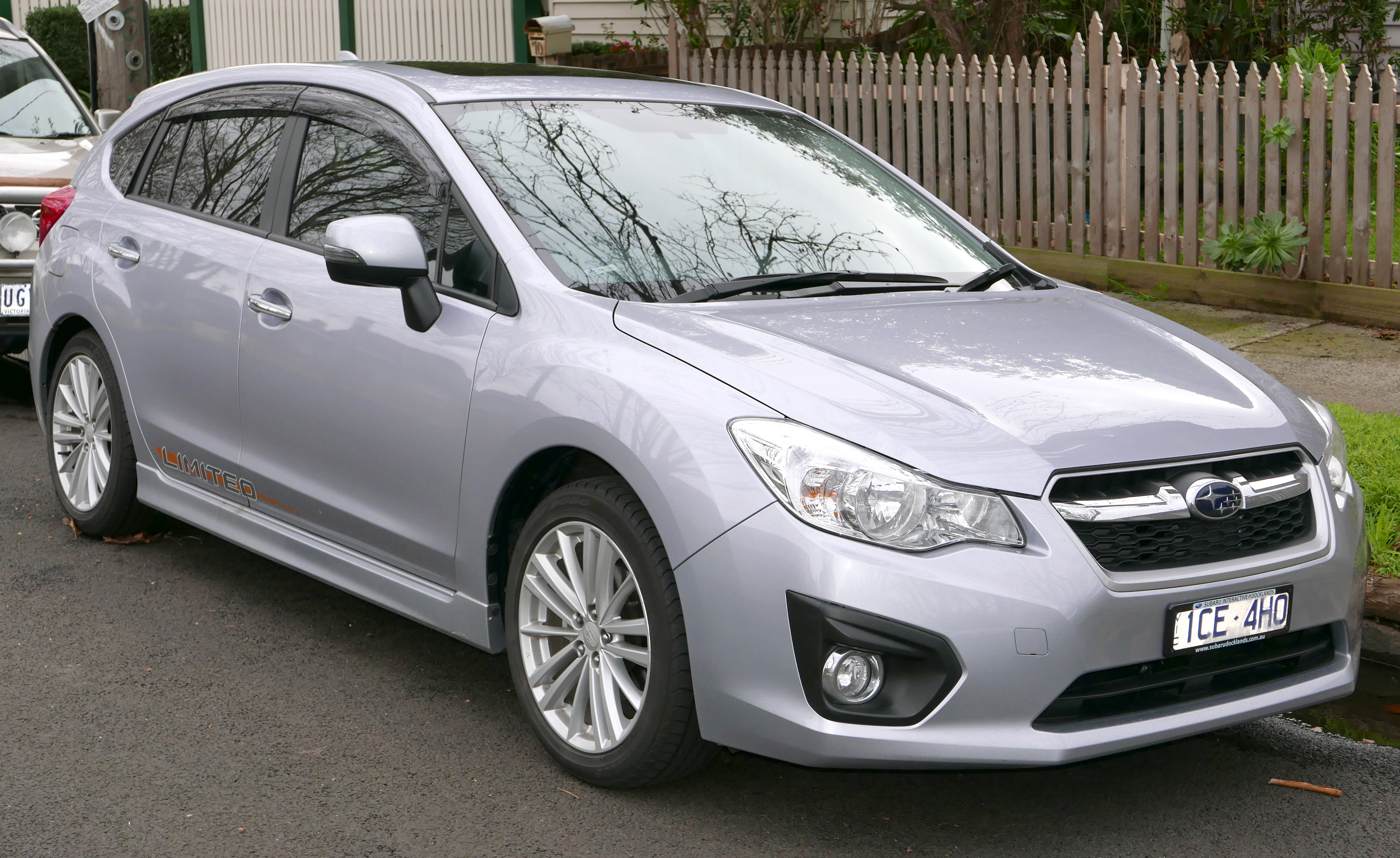

Overview
- Model code: GJ (sedan); GP (hatchback)
- Production: 2011–2016
- Model years: 2012–2016
- Assembly: Japan: Ōta, Gunma

Body and chassis
- Body style: 4-door sedan 5-door hatchback
- Related: Subaru XV/Crosstrek (GP); Subaru Levorg (VM); Subaru WRX (VA)

Powertrain
- Engine: Gasoline: 1.6 L FB16 H4; 2.0 L FB20 H4; Diesel: 2.0 L EE20 turbo H4
- Transmission: 5-speed manual 6-speed manual Lineartronic CVT

Dimensions
- Wheelbase: 2,644 mm (104.1 in)
- Length: 4,580 mm (180.3 in) (sedan); 4,414 mm (173.8 in) (hatchback)
- Width: 1,740 mm (68.5 in)
- Height: 1,465 mm (57.7 in)
- Curb weight: 1,320 kg (2,910 lb)

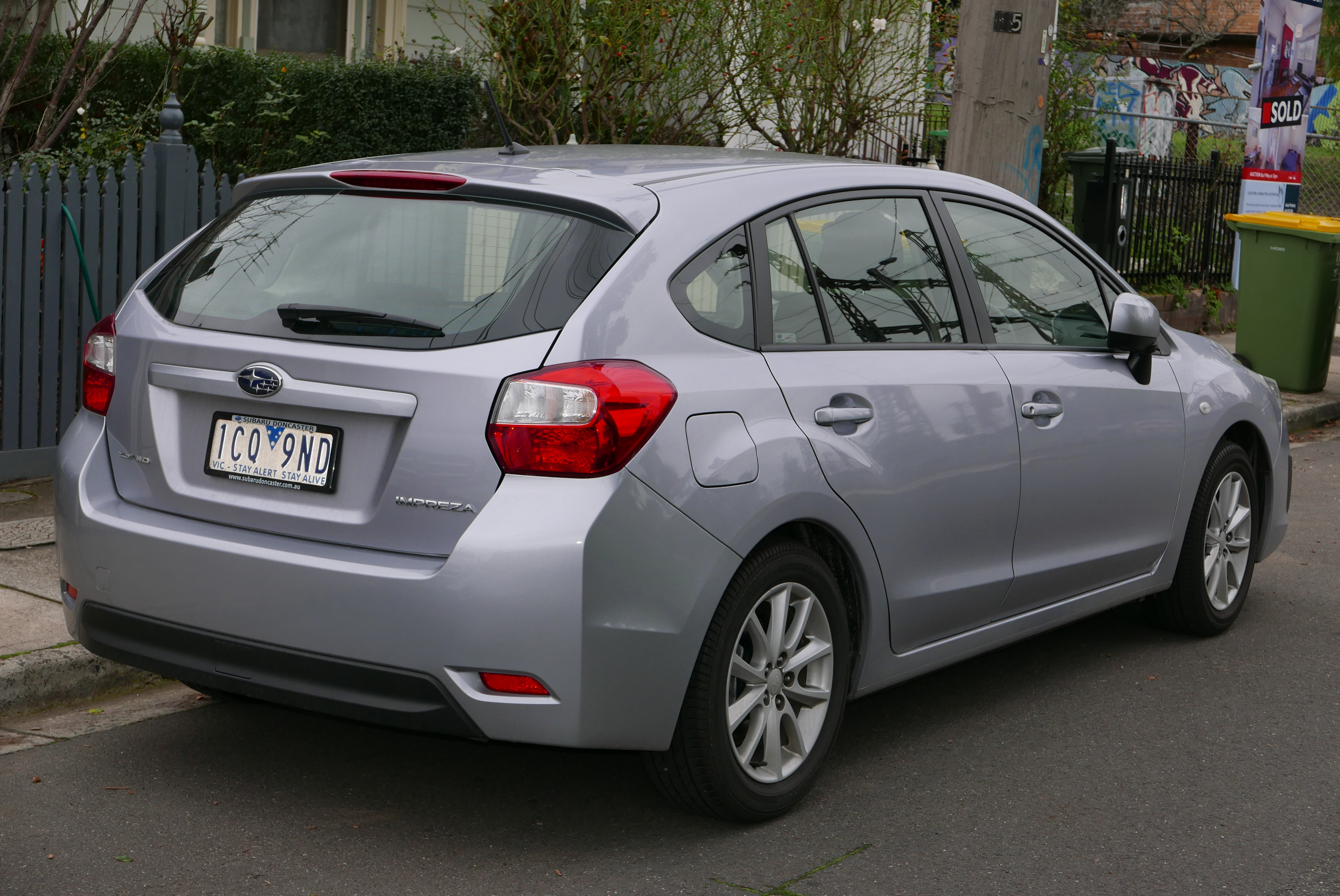
Hatchback

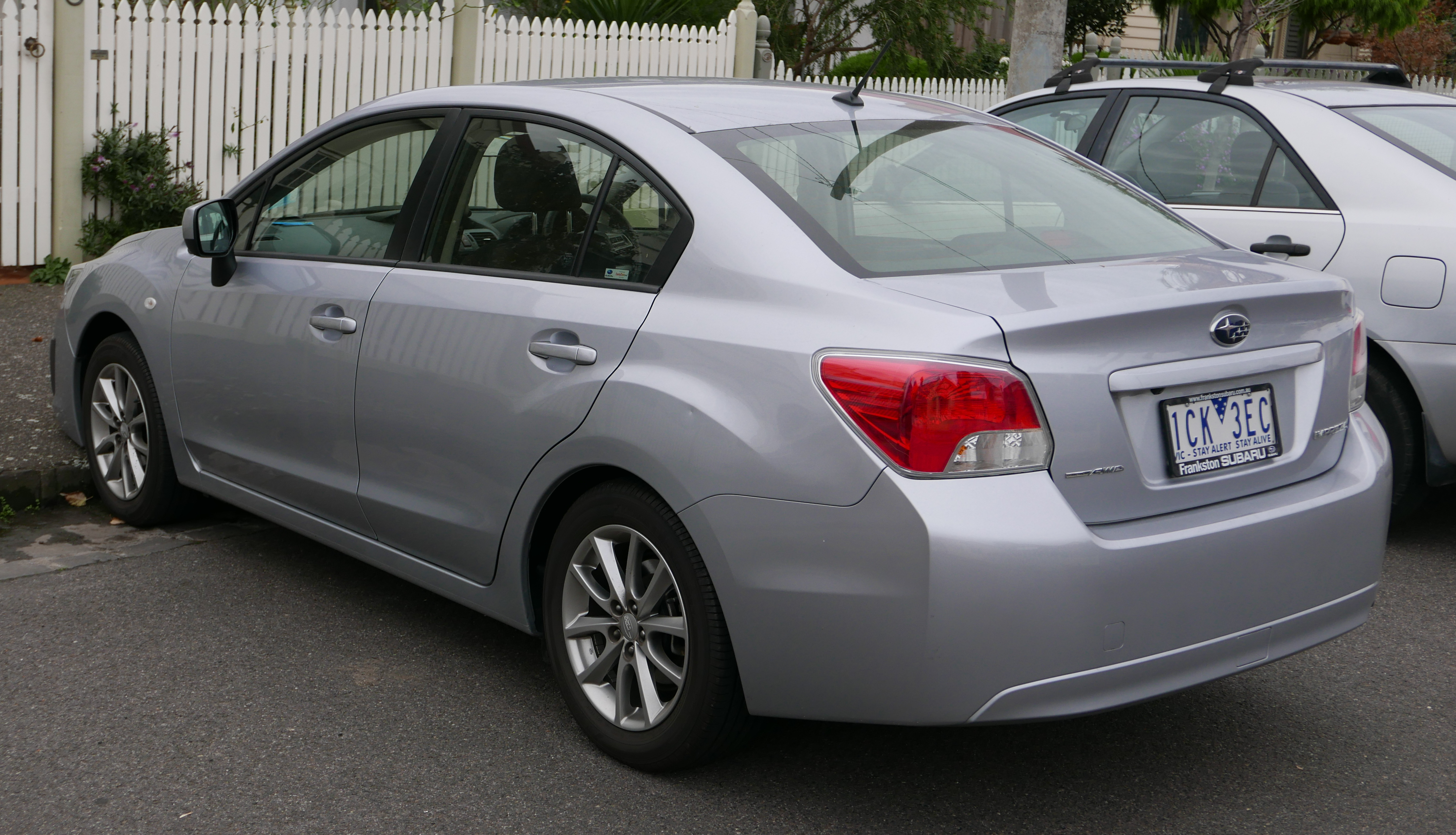
Sedan

Four-door sedan or five-door hatchback versions of the fourth-generation Impreza were unveiled in 2011 at the New York International Auto Show. The car went on sale in late 2011 as a 2012 model year. There is also a bigger station wagon with different bodywork, called the Subaru Levorg. It was first shown at the 2013 Tokyo Motor Show and went on sale in April 2014.

Early US models include a choice of a 2.0-liter DOHC (148 hp) engine, five-speed manual or Lineartronic CVT with paddle shifting six-speed manual mode. Trim package included base 2.0i, 2.0i Premium, and 2.0i Limited.

Japan models went on sale on 20 December 2011. a choice of four-door sedan (as Impreza G4) or five-door hatchback body (as Impreza Sport), 1.6-liter DOHC FB16 (1.6i, 1.6i-L) or 2.0-liter DOHC FB20 (2.0i, 2.0i EyeSight, 2.0i-S, 2.0i-S EyeSight), five-speed manual or Lineartronic continuously variable transmission (CVT). The smaller 1.6-liter engine is offered in Japan so as to reduce the annual Japanese road tax obligation.

Remaining nearly the same size as the previous series, the new model is lighter and more fuel efficient, plus is claimed to be better packaged. The 2012 Impreza received longer wheelbase that provides more interior room for passengers. The Impreza hatchback rear head-and-legroom is impressive; two adults can ride in the back of the Impreza with comfort. Whereas, in the hatchback, the rear 65/35 split seatbacks fold down, offering 52.4 cu. ft. of cargo space.

Higher quality materials are fitted throughout the interior, and due to its larger exterior dimensions as defined by Japanese government regulations, the Impreza is an upmarket product in Japan. It is now almost exactly the same dimensions as the first and second Subaru Legacy (1990–1999). The 2015–2016 models had an updated grille, bumper, side mirrors and increased sound deadening.

The third-generation high-performance WRX variants continued in production until new versions were released in early 2014. In 2014, Subaru decided to move away from marketing the WRX and WRX STI under the Impreza name. The WRX and WRX STI are performance trims of the Impreza with higher output engines, firmer suspension, larger brakes, slightly resculpted body panels, lowered ride height and larger intakes. Subaru had promised to completely move the WRX and STi off the Impreza chassis and body to create a standalone model, but they instead chose to simply alter the Impreza's body, and chassis and remove the Impreza name. Subaru decided to not produce a WRX or WRX STi wagon as had been previously offered. The wagon made up approximately 50 percent of US WRX and WRX STI sales.

In addition to the regular models, Subaru also offered the Impreza Sport Hatchback in the Premium and Limited trim levels. The so-called American Impreza Sport (not to be confused with the JDM regular hatchback with the same name) has the rugged style with side spoilers, roof rack, different style alloys. For the initial 2012 model year only, two-tone paint was offered, similar to the prior generation's Outback Sport package. Unlike the old Outback Sport or new XV, however, it does not have increased ground clearance. For the Premium model grade, buyers can choose 5 speed manual or Lineartronic CVT, while the Limited is only available with CVT.

EyeSight consists of two cameras with one on each side of the interior rear view mirror, that use human like stereoscopic vision to judge distances and generally keep tabs on the driver. The system can help maintain a safe distance on the highway, a lane departure warning system, a wake up call when traffic lights change, and even keeps an eye out for pedestrians. Autonomous cruise control system has been integrated into the EyeSight feature as a driver safety aid. This feature is initially available only in Japan, but was expanded to US models of other vehicles, beginning with 2013 Legacy and Outback models.

In 2013, the Impreza won the IIHS Top Safety Pick+ award. In 2014, the car won the National Business Review Sports Car of the year award in New Zealand.

=== Subaru XV/Crosstrek ===
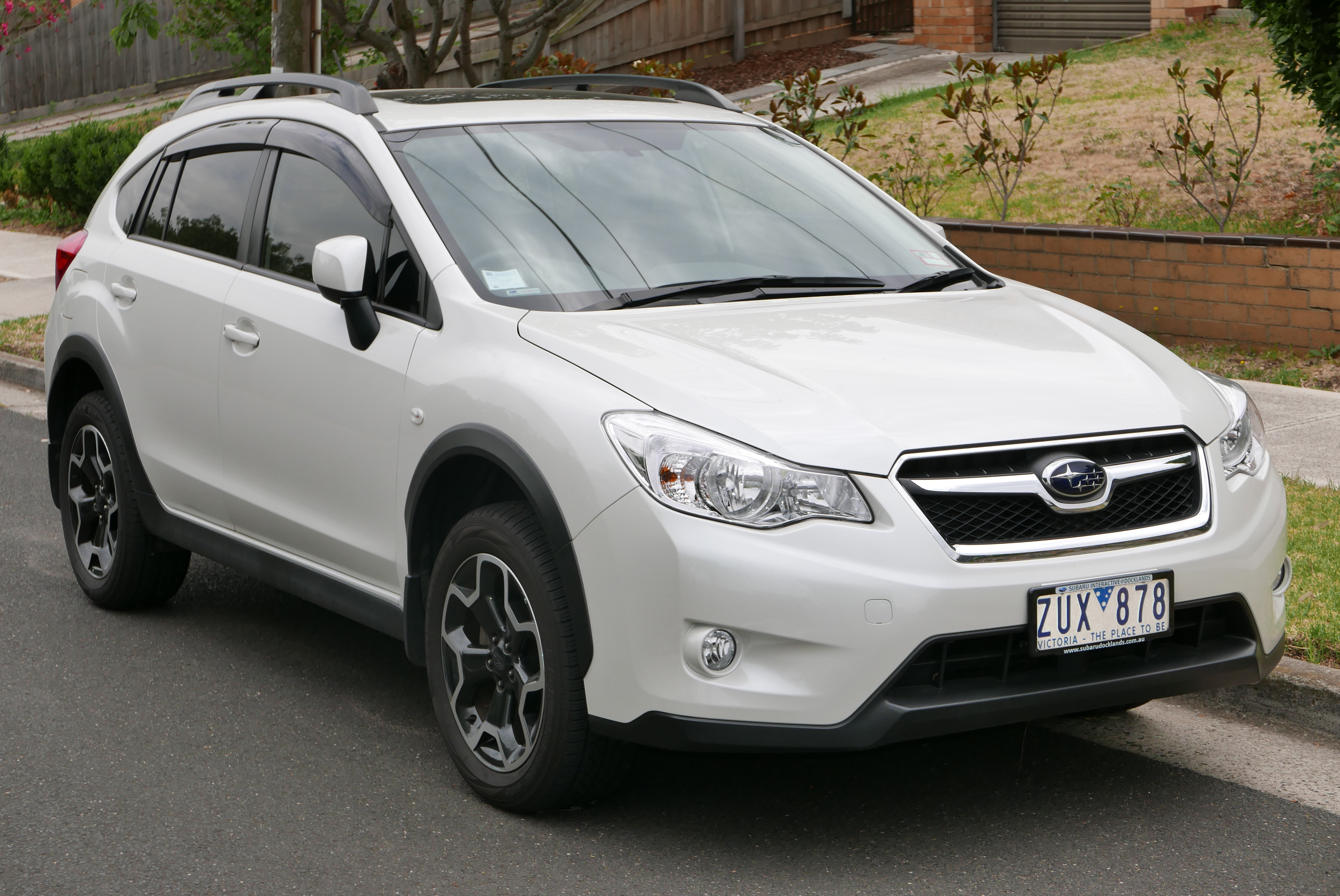
Subaru XV (GP)

Like its predecessor, the fourth-generation Impreza was also available with a crossover-styled model. However, instead of the third generation where it was badged as the Impreza XV or the Outback Sport, it was now called the Subaru XV. In North America, it was named the Subaru XV Crosstrek until 2015 when it was changed to Subaru Crosstrek. In Japan, it continued to be called the Subaru Impreza XV. This model debuted at the 2011 Frankfurt Motor Show. It went on sale in Japan in September 2012 and in the United States during the 2012 New York International Auto Show. It made its Southeast Asian debut at the 2012 Indonesia International Motor Show.

=== Subaru WRX (VA) ===
For the VA series WRX released in 2014 for the 2015 model year, Subaru took a different approach with the model when compared to past generations. This time, the Impreza name was dropped in all markets in which the new model was named simply the WRX, as had been the case in North America with the previous model, while in Japan it was sold as the WRX S4. The body design also took a stronger departure from the Impreza donor model than in the past. The general WRX profile/silhouette was carried over from the Impreza, as were the front doors, trunk lid, and interior. However, the entire front end bodywork plus the rear quarter panels were unique to the WRX. The rear doors received a subtle reskin with an upwards kink and revised character line, but retained an otherwise identical shape.

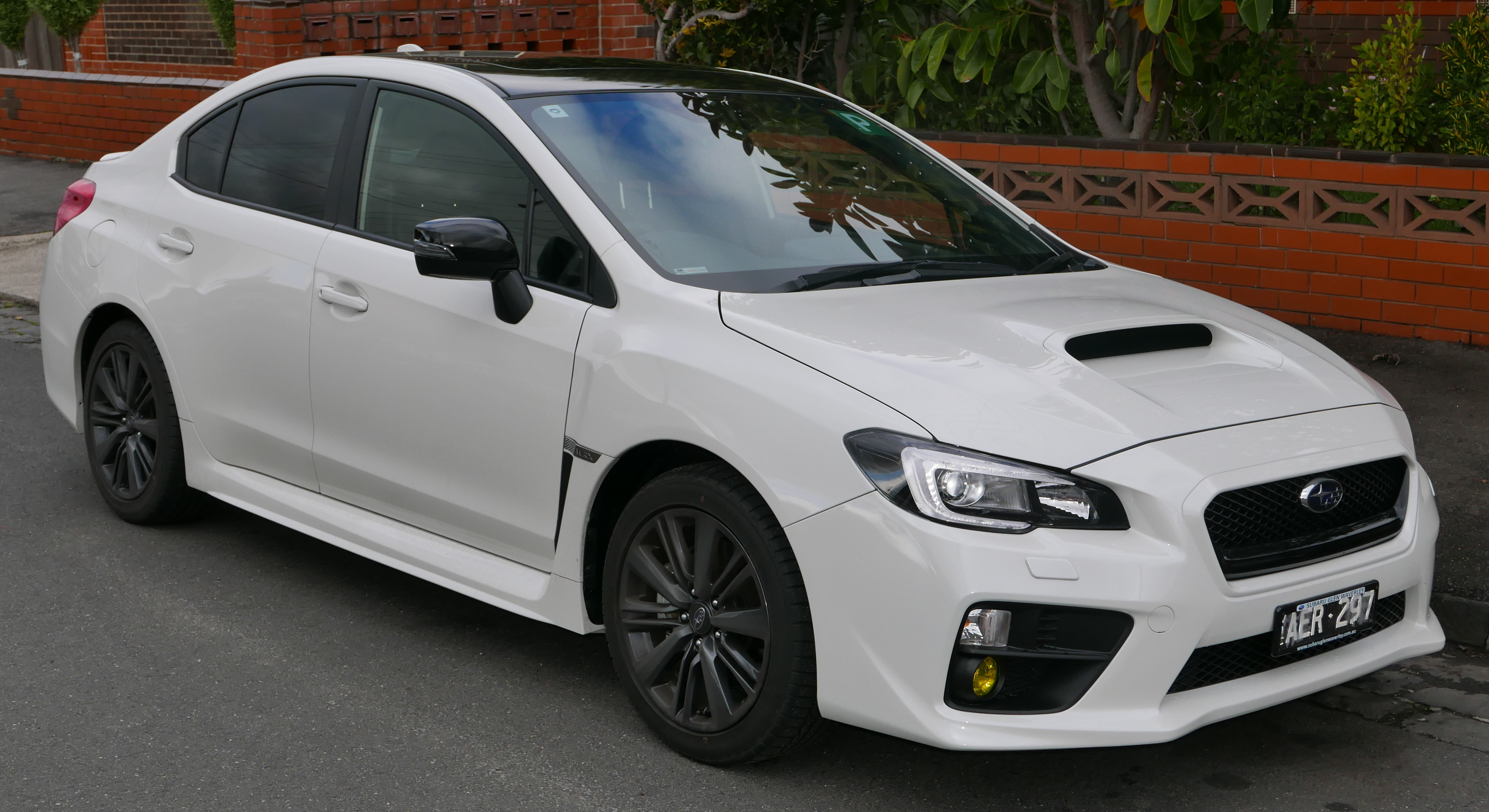
Subaru WRX (VA)

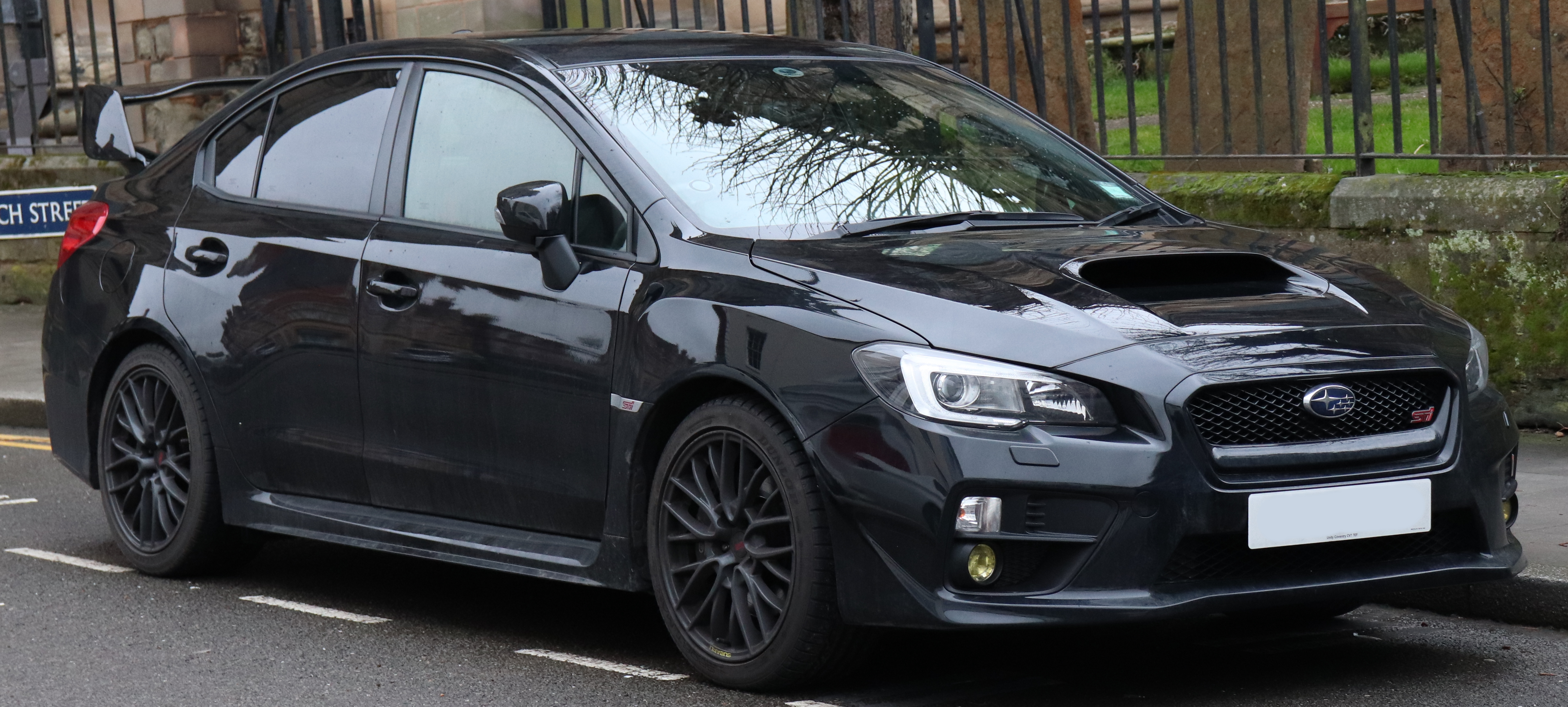
Subaru WRX STI (VA)

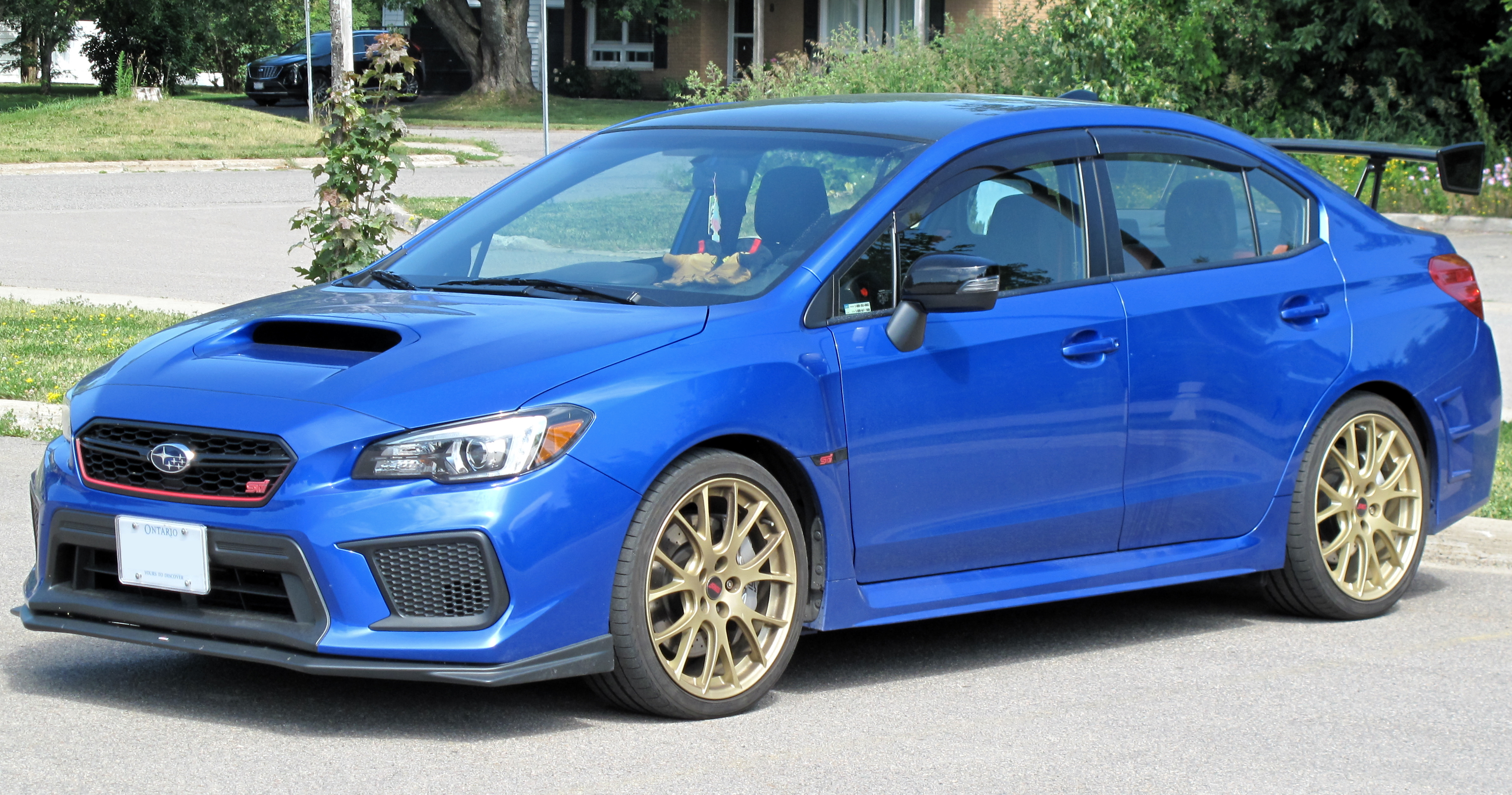
Subaru WRX STI (VA, facelift)

=== Safety ===
IIHS scores (2012)
Moderate overlap front (original test)	Good
Side (original test)	Good
Roof strength	Good
Head restraints and seats	Good

ANCAP test results* Subaru Impreza all sedan and hatch variants (2012)
Test	Score
Overall	5 /5 stars
Frontal offset	14.33/16
Side impact	16/16
Pole	2/2
Seat belt reminders	3/3
Whiplash protection	Good
Pedestrian protection	Adequate
Electronic stability control	Standard

== Fifth generation (GK, GT; 2016) ==
Fifth generation
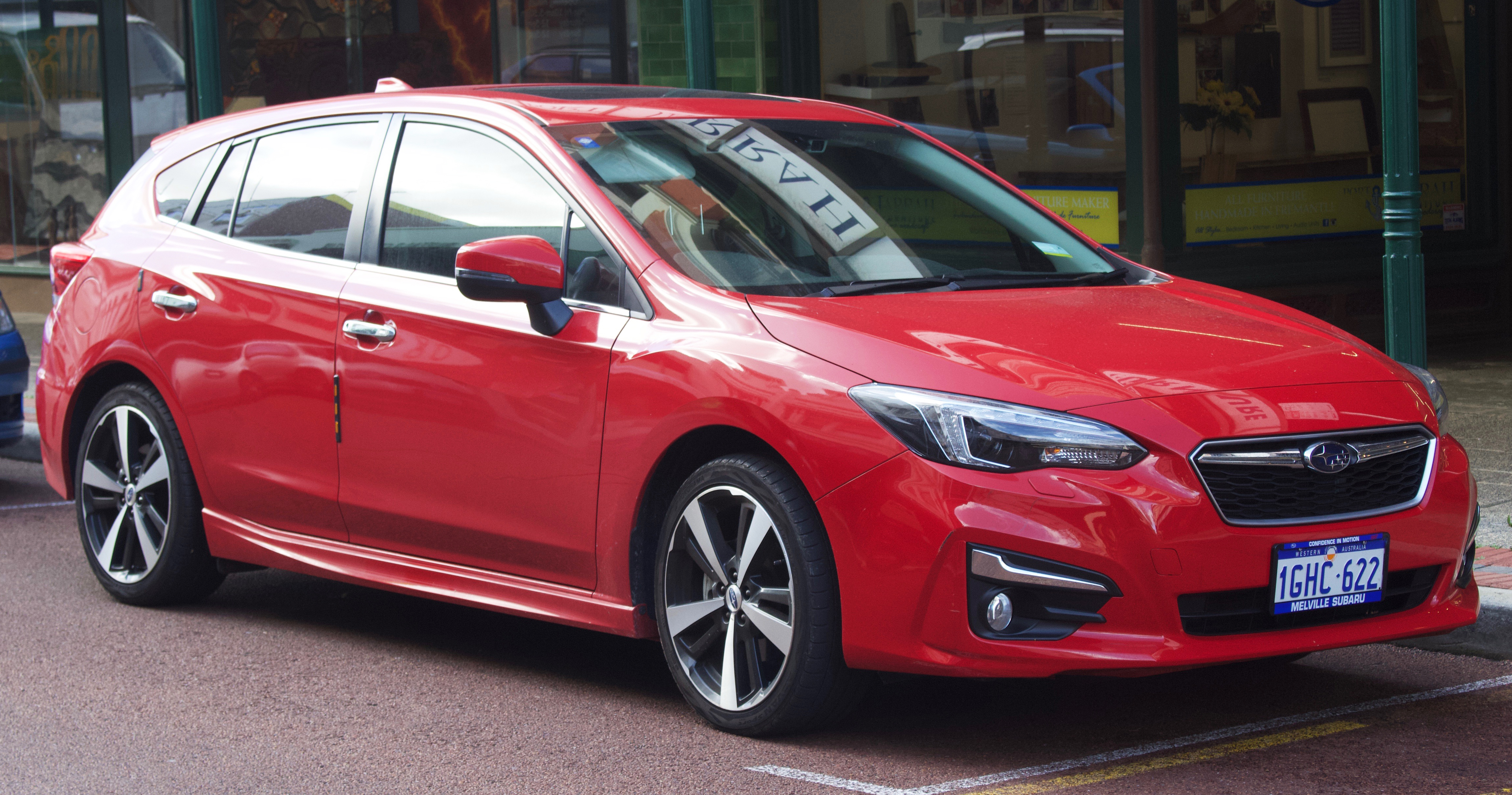

Overview
- Model code: GK (sedan); GT (hatchback)
- Production: 2016–2023
- Model years: 2017–2023
- Assembly: Japan: Ōta, Gunma (Yajima Plant); United States: Lafayette, Indiana (SIA)
- Designer: Takashi Hagino, Yoshifumi Tomita and Shinya Murase

Body and chassis
- Body style: 4-door sedan 5-door hatchback
- Platform: Subaru Global Platform
- Related: Subaru XV/Crosstrek (GT); Subaru Levorg/WRX wagon/WRX Sportswagon/WRX GT (VN); Subaru WRX (VB)

Powertrain
- Engine: Gasoline: 1.6 L FB16 H4; 2.0 L DAVCS FB20D H4; Gasoline hybrid: 2.0 L FB20D e-Boxer H4
- Transmission: 5-speed manual Lineartronic CVT
- Hybrid drivetrain: MHEV (e-boxer)

Dimensions
- Wheelbase: 2,670 mm (105.1 in)
- Length: 4,625 mm (182.1 in) (sedan); 4,460 mm (175.6 in) (hatchback)
- Width: 1,775 mm (69.9 in)
- Height: 1,455 mm (57.3 in) (sedan); Hatchback: 1,480 mm (58.3 in) (hatchback)
- Curb weight: 1,386–1,433 kg (3,056–3,159 lb)

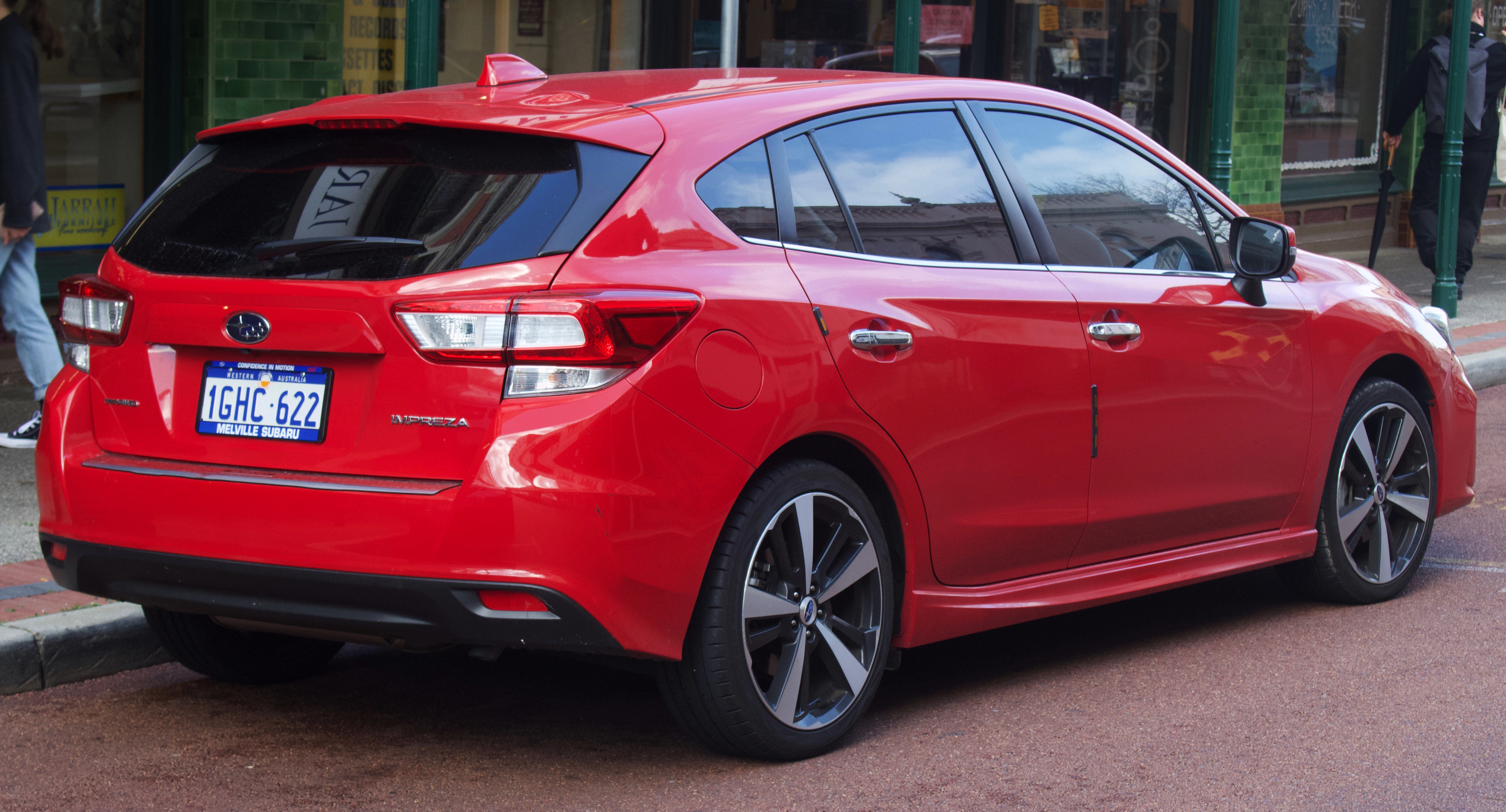
Hatchback

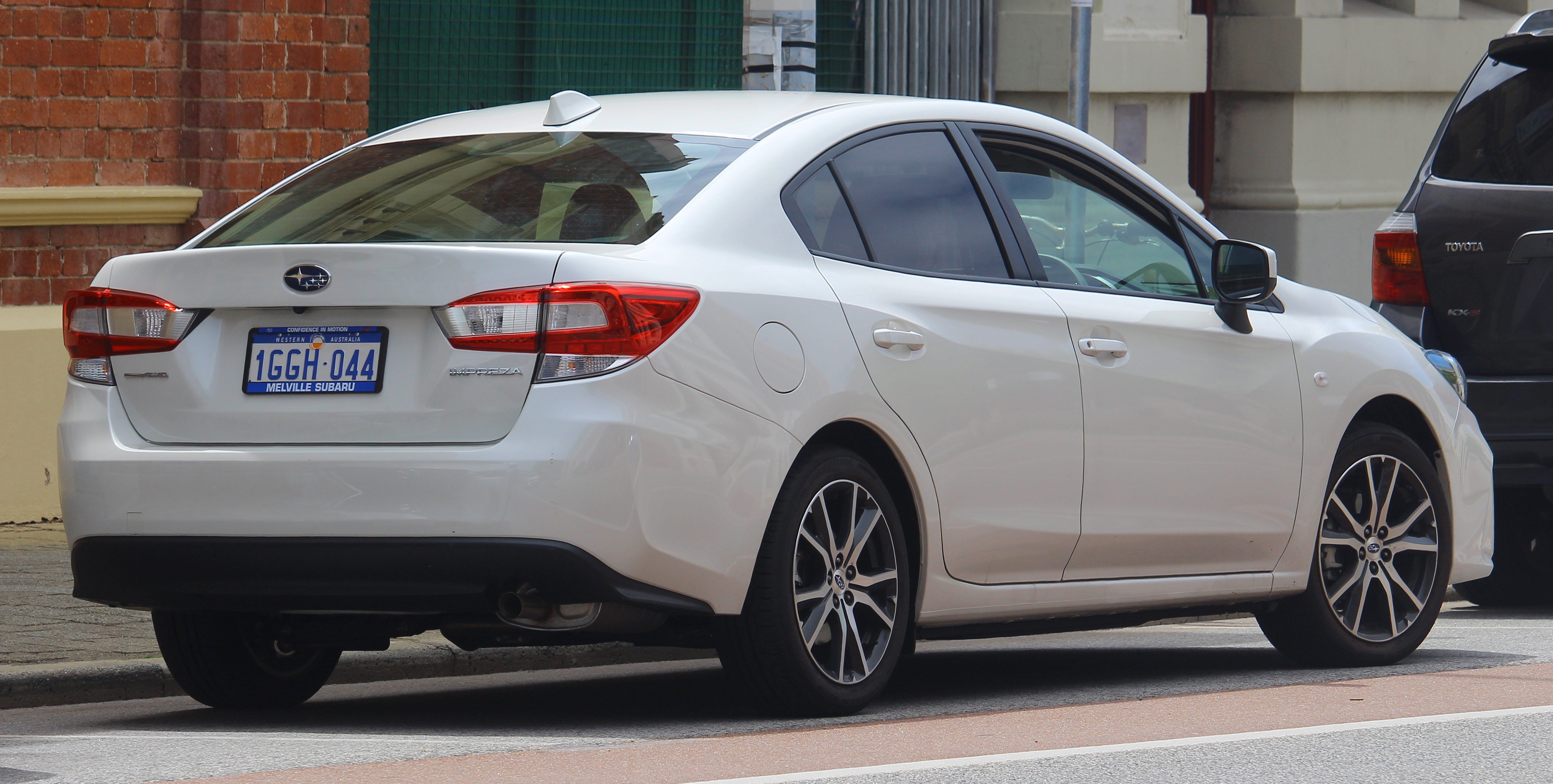
Sedan

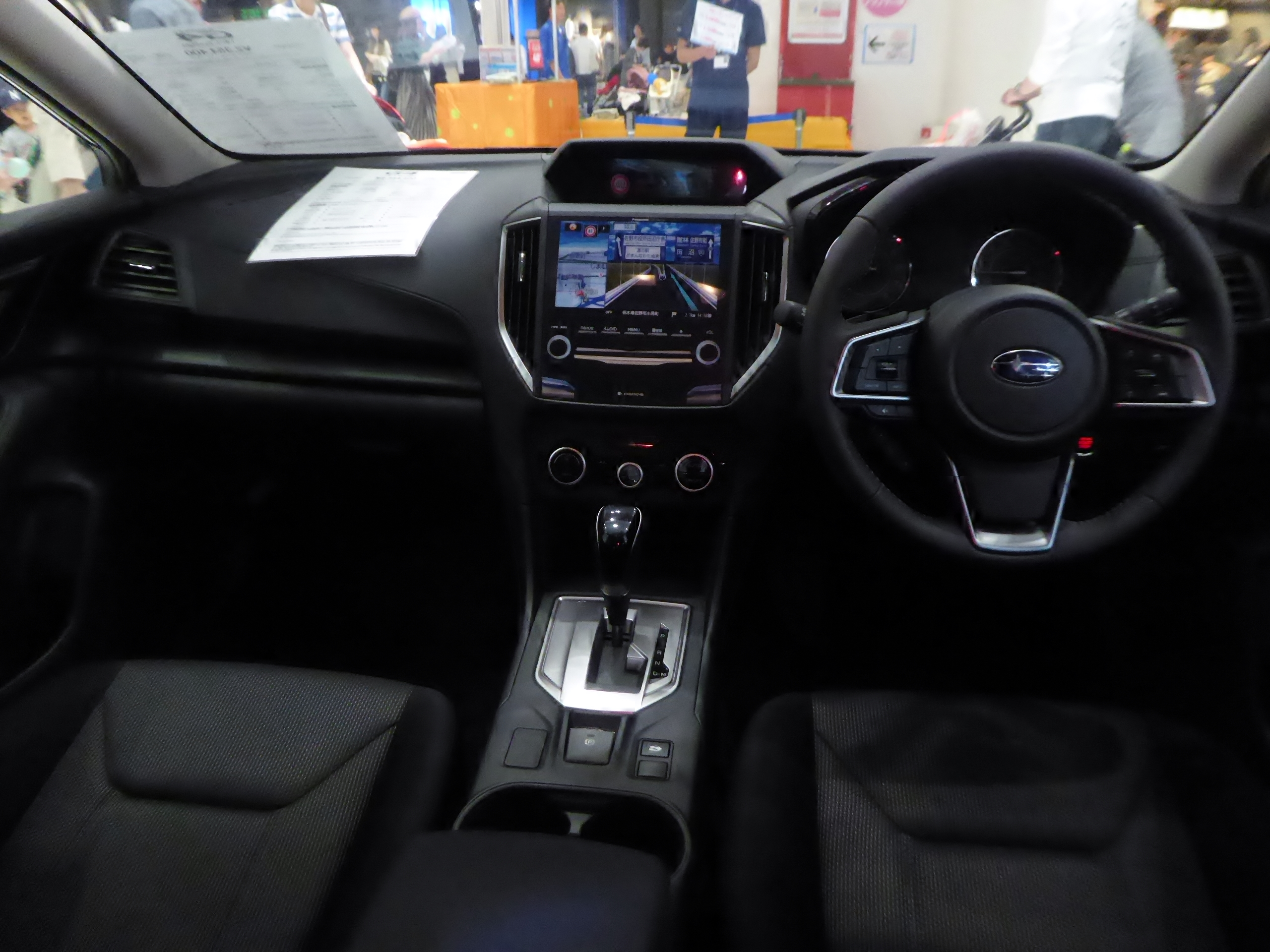
Interior

Subaru unveiled the fifth-generation 2017 model year Impreza sedan and hatchback at the New York International Auto Show in March 2016. The fifth generation is the first model based on the new Subaru Global Platform, which would be the base for all future Subaru models.

Japanese domestic market models went on sale on 13 October 2016 at Subaru dealerships, while the new Impreza entered the core North American and Australian markets for the company in December 2016. In Japan, the new Impreza outsold its monthly sales target of 2,500 units by more than fourfold, with 11,050 orders. According to Subaru, demand from customers in the Japanese domestic market switching from other brands was notable, representing 51% of all orders, indicating that the Impreza was attracting a wider range of customers there. North American models were produced for the first time at Subaru of Indiana Automotive, Inc. in Lafayette, Indiana, while the Crosstrek continues to be produced in Japan. Models for markets outside of North America continue to be produced in Japan. SIA also produces the North American-market Subaru Outback and Subaru Legacy, and also produced the three-row Ascent crossover previewed by the Viziv 7 concept from the 2016 Los Angeles Auto Show in 2018.

The new Subaru Global Platform underpins both sedan and hatch versions of the Impreza. This new platform has an increased rigidity of 70% to 100% over the outgoing model and a lower center of gravity by 5 mm (0.2 inches). 95% of this new Impreza is all-new compared to the fourth generation. The suspension has been set up for better comfort, while Active Torque Vectoring in some models improves dynamics. The car is longer and wider than the old one, with a longer wheelbase. Much of the increase in wheelbase was used to improve front and rear-seat legroom; in the United States, Subaru now boasts that the new Impreza has category-leading passenger room.

Powering the new Subaru Impreza is a revised version of the FB20 2.0-litre direct-injection boxer-four. This engine is sold in all markets except Europe, where it came available in its hybrid variant ("e-Boxer") in March 2020. A 1.6-litre engine continued to be available in Europe and in the Japanese domestic market. With around 80% of parts revamped, the engine produces 152 hp (113 kW) in North American specs, four more than before. Subaru's Lineartronic CVT was also improved with enhanced ratio coverage, and a 5-speed manual transmission continues to be available. The changes made to the Impreza's 2.0L engine are supposed to offer slightly improved acceleration and flexibility of power delivery. Although the engine has 152 hp, some auto reviewers felt that the new Impreza continued to fall short in power when compared to competitors from other brands. Some competing compact sedans such as the Volkswagen Jetta, Honda Civic, and Hyundai Elantra were sold with optional engines offering 200 hp or more. Subaru rated the new Impreza in the US market (with 2.0L engine) an EPA-estimated 28 miles per US gallon (8.4 L/100 km; 34 mpg_{‑imp}) city /38 miles per US gallon (6.2 L/100 km; 46 mpg_{‑imp}) highway. As with the previous generation Impreza, Subaru's Symmetrical AWD was standard in all markets except Japan, where it was optional.

Subaru's EyeSight suite of active safety functions was available, as was a new infotainment system with both Apple CarPlay and Android Auto. In the North American and Australian market models, CarPlay and Android Auto were standard on all trims. The North American model Impreza Limited was also offered with a power driver's seat for the first time in the model's history. Although not present in the North American model, the new Impreza was also the first car ever produced by a Japanese brand to include a pedestrian protection airbag as standard. The new Impreza earned a record high safety score under the Japan New Car Assessment Program and earned top safety marks from the Euro NCAP in 2017.

At the car's introduction in 2016, it won the Car of the Year Japan Award. This win gave Subaru only its second ever COTY trophy and its first victory since the Legacy B4 won 13 years ago.

=== Subaru XV/Crosstrek ===
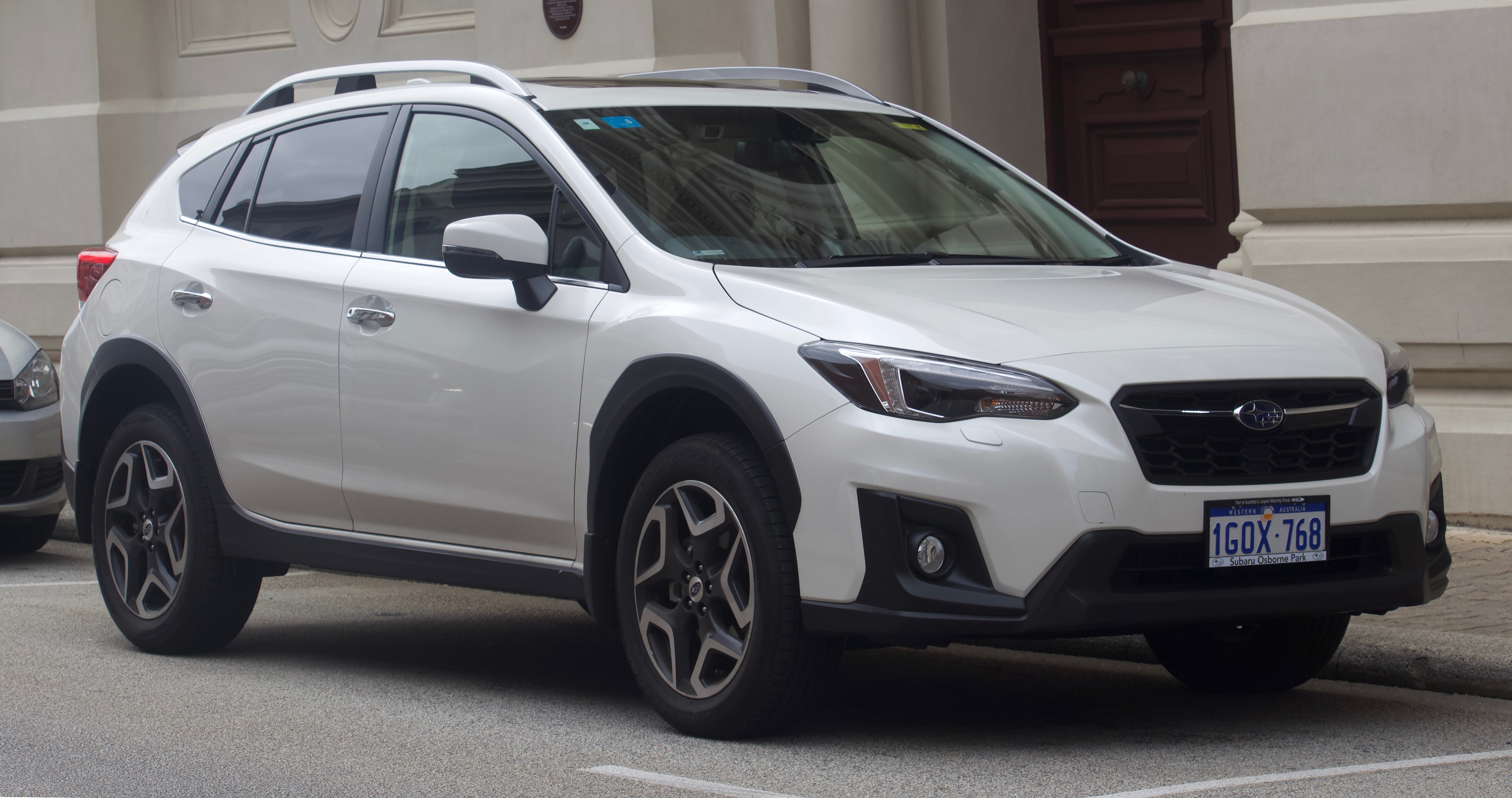
Subaru XV (GT)

The new Subaru XV (or Crosstrek for the North American market) was unveiled at the Geneva International Motor Show in March 2017. Like the Impreza, the XV/Crosstrek has moved to the Subaru Global Platform. Minimum ground clearance is 220 mm (8.7 in) and like its predecessor, matte black cladding has been added to each side to add a "rugged flavor", creating "a dynamic form expressing all the enjoyment to be expected from a crossover vehicle".

=== Subaru WRX (2022) ===
The second-generation standalone WRX model was unveiled in September 2021.

=== Safety ===
Euro NCAP test results* Subaru Impreza 2.0i-S EyeSight (2017)
Test	Points	%
Overall:	5 /5 stars	
Adult occupant:	35.8	94%
Child occupant:	44	89%
Pedestrian:	34.6	82%
Safety assist:	8.3	68%

IIHS scores (2017)
Small overlap front (driver)	Good		
Small overlap front (passenger)	Good		
Moderate overlap front (original test)	Good		
Side (original test)	Good		
Side (updated test)	Poor		
Roof strength	Good		
Head restraints and seats	Good		
Headlights	Good	Acceptable	Marginal
Front crash prevention: vehicle-to-vehicle	Superior		
Child seat anchors (LATCH) ease of use	Good+		

ANCAP test results* Subaru Impreza (2016)
Test	Score
Overall	5 /5 stars
Frontal offset	14.80/16
Side impact	16/16
Pole	2/2
Seat belt reminders	3/3
Whiplash protection	Good
Pedestrian protection	Good
Electronic stability control	Standard

== Sixth generation (GU; 2023) ==
Sixth generation
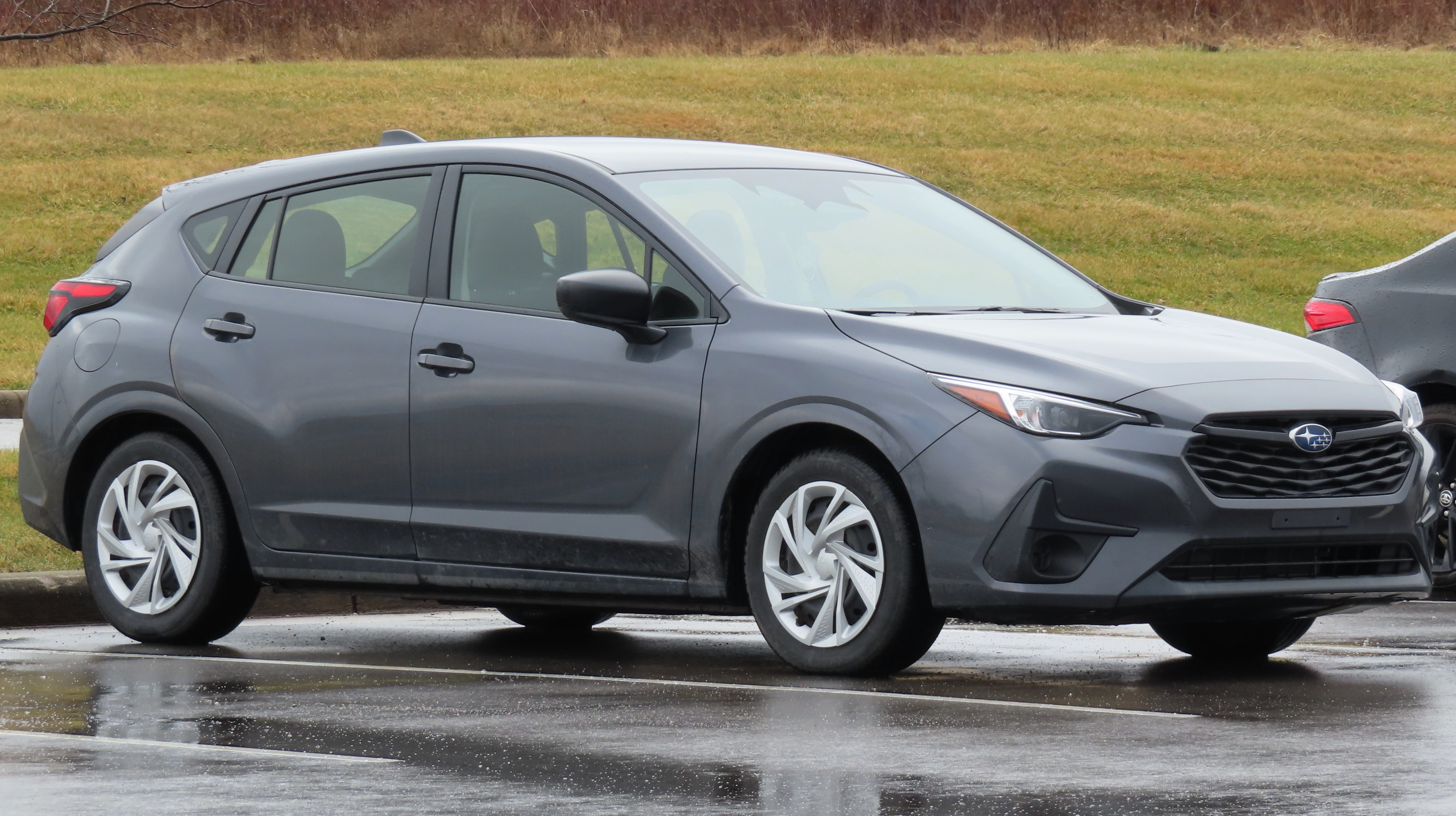

Overview
- Model code: GU
- Production: 2023–present
- Model years: 2024–present
- Assembly: Japan: Ōta, Gunma

Body and chassis
- Body style: 5-door hatchback
- Platform: Subaru Global Platform
- Related: Subaru Crosstrek; Subaru Impreza (GK/GT)

Powertrain
- Engine: Gasoline: 2.0 L FB20D H4 (GU6/7); 2.5 L FB25D H4; Gasoline hybrid/MHEV: 2.0 L FB20D e-Boxer H4 (GUD/E)
- Transmission: Lineartronic CVT; 8-speed Lineartronic CVT (Sport, RS)
- Hybrid drivetrain: MHEV (e-Boxer)

Dimensions
- Wheelbase: 105.1 in (2,670 mm)
- Length: 176.2 in (4,475 mm)
- Width: 70.1 in (1,781 mm)
- Height: 58.3 in (1,481 mm)
- Curb weight: Manual: 2,976 lbs (1,350 kg), Automatic: 3,047 lbs (1,382 kg)

The sixth-generation Impreza was revealed on November 17, 2022, at the 2022 LA Auto Show being based on the outgoing model. It went on sale in the United States in the second quarter of 2023 as a 2024 model year vehicle.

The sedan was discontinued, along with the manual transmission, leaving the hatchback and the Lineartronic CVT as the only options. Torsional rigidity is improved by ten percent by using more high-strength steel. The Impreza became more upmarket with standard Subaru EyeSight and automatic emergency braking. The dual-pinion steering rack from the WRX was also added. For the first time since it was discontinued in 2005, Subaru revived the 2.5 RS model, equipping it with a 2.5-liter FB25D engine which develops 182 hp (136 kW) and 178 lb⋅ft (241 N⋅m) of torque. The Base and Sport models use the 2.0-liter FB20D engine carried over from the prior generation, which makes 152 hp (113 kW) and 145 lb⋅ft (197 N⋅m) of torque.

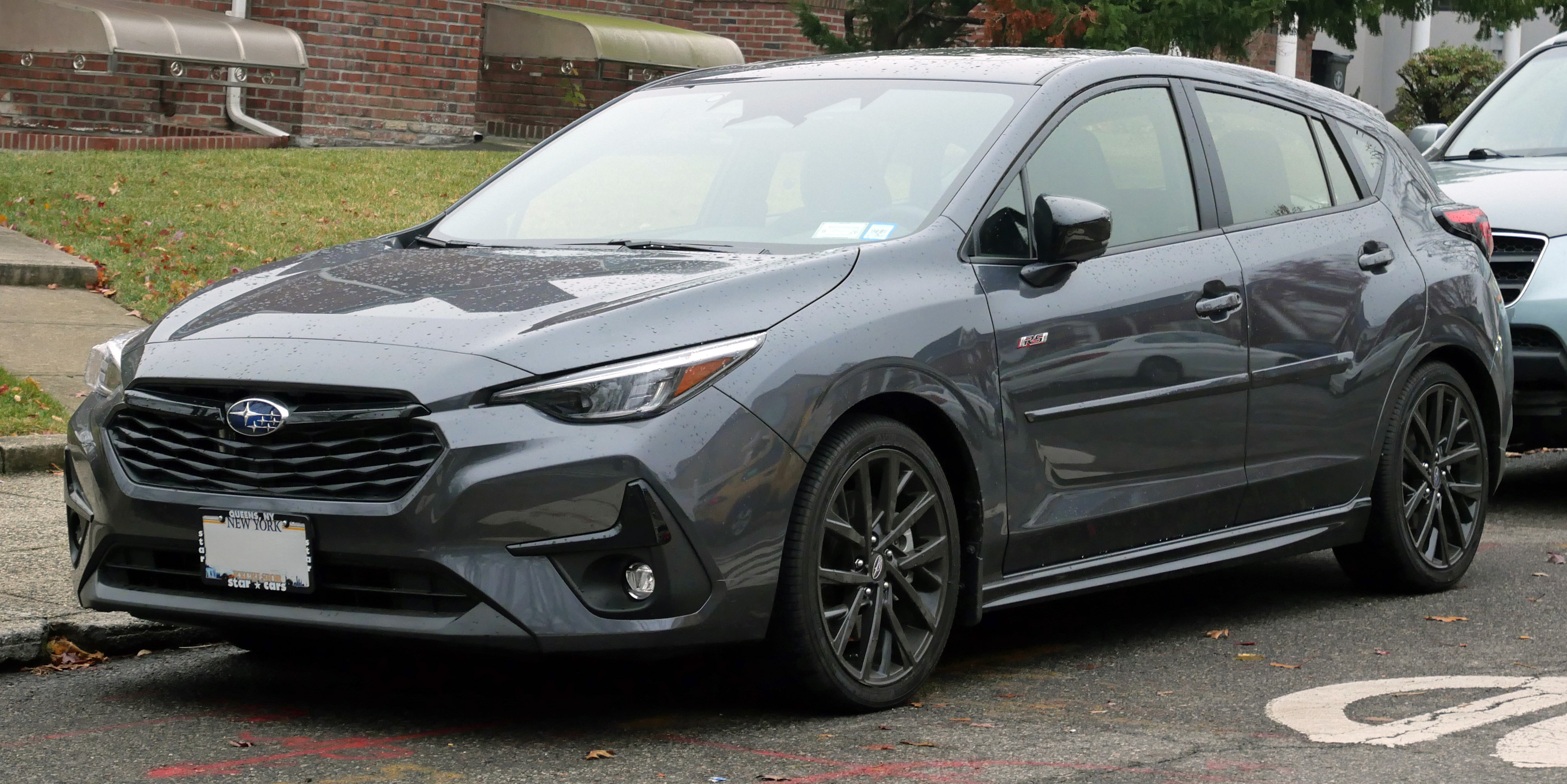
Subaru Impreza RS

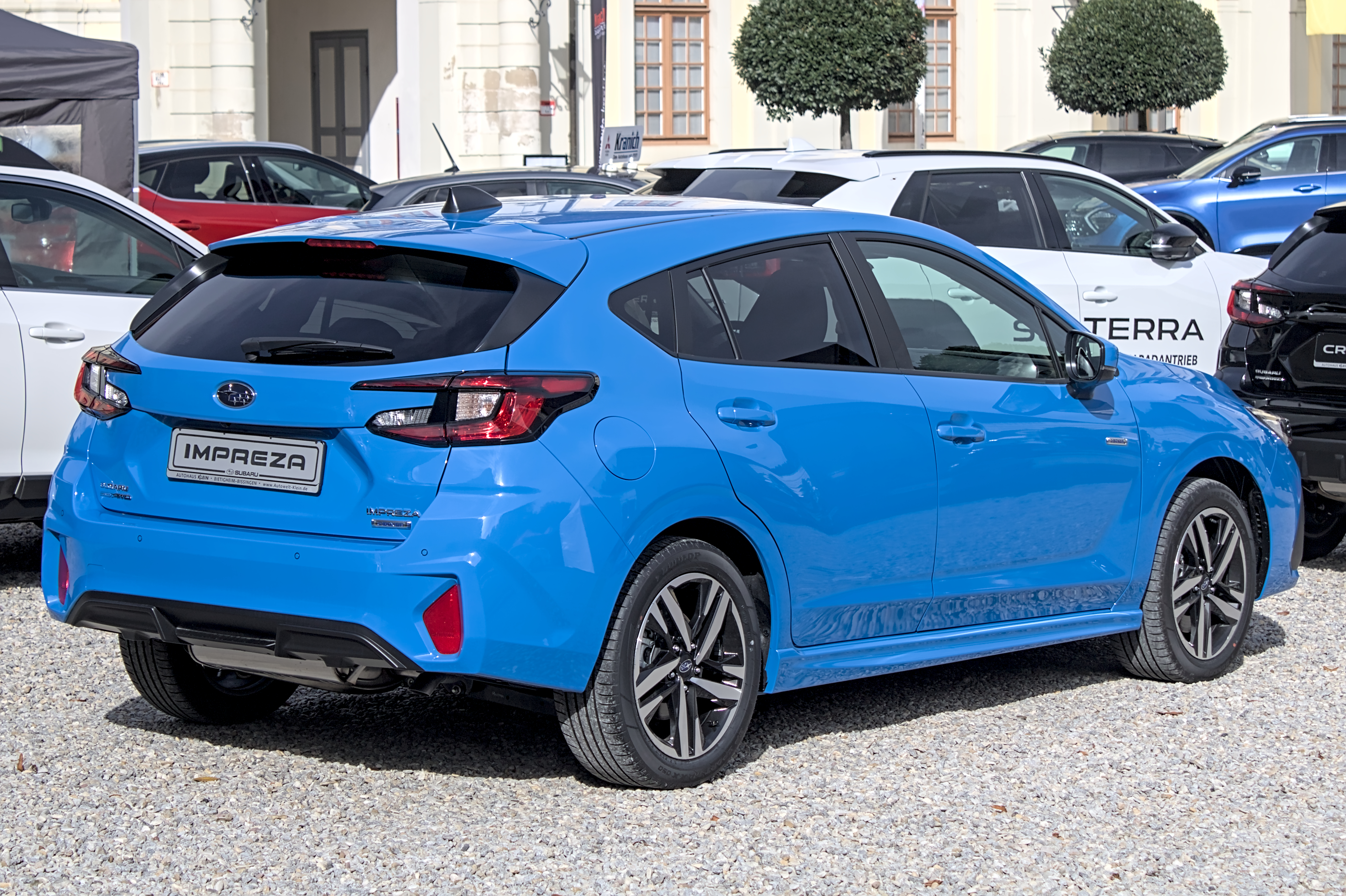
Rear view

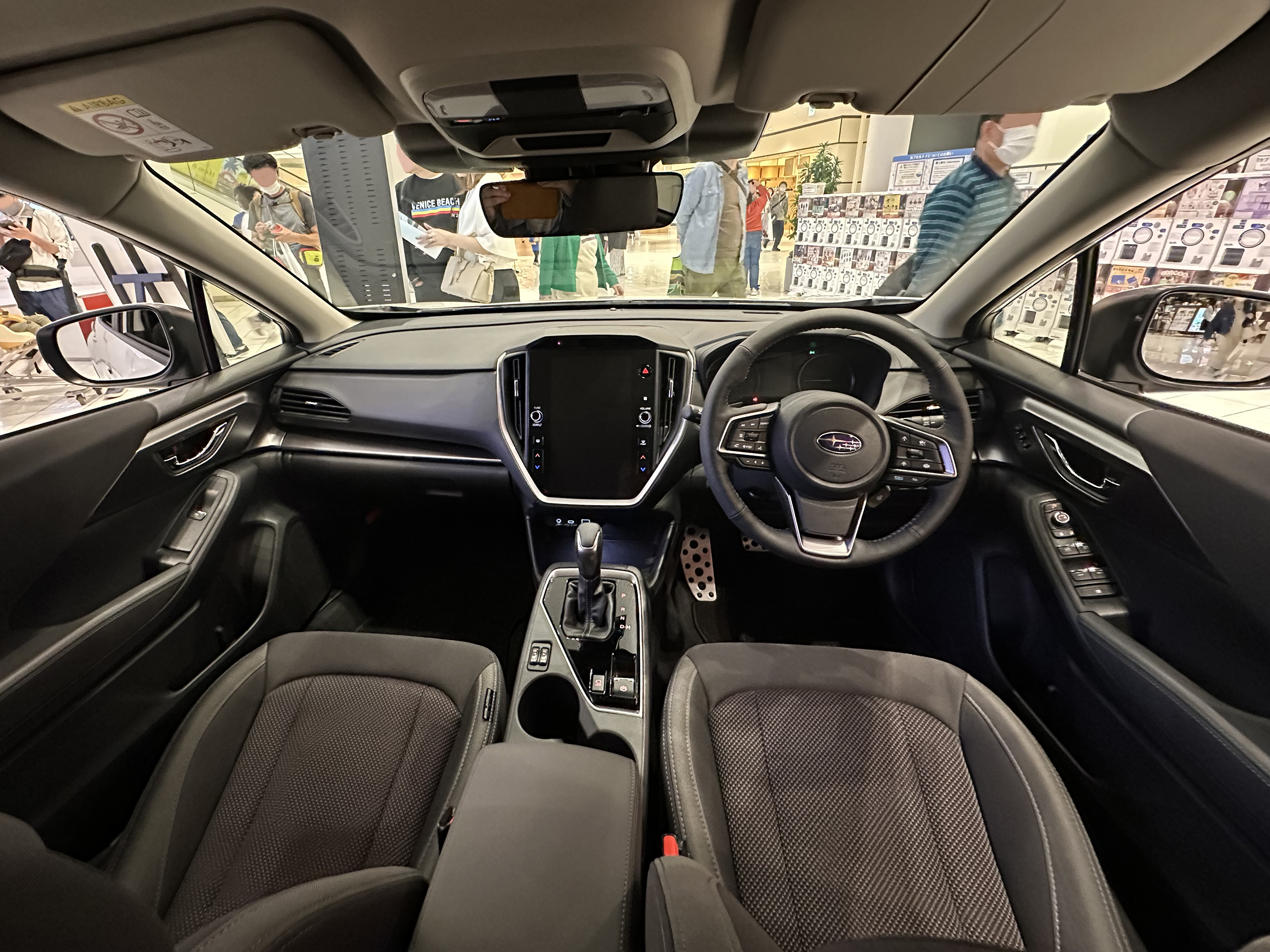
Interior

=== Subaru Crosstrek ===
The third-generation Subaru Crosstrek was revealed in Japan on September 15, 2022. It debuted in North America at the Chicago Auto Show on February 9, 2023.

=== Safety ===
IIHS scores (2024)
Small overlap front	Good
Moderate overlap front (original test)	Good
Moderate overlap front (updated test)	Marginal
Side (updated test)	Good
Headlights	Good
Front crash prevention: vehicle-to-vehicle	Good
Seatbelt reminders	Good
Child seat anchors (LATCH) ease of use	Good+

ANCAP test results Subaru Impreza (2024, aligned with Euro NCAP)
Test	Points	%
Overall:	5 /5 stars	
Adult occupant:	33.58	83%
Child occupant:	44.87	91%
Pedestrian:	53.11	84%
Safety assist:	13.29	73%

== Police use ==
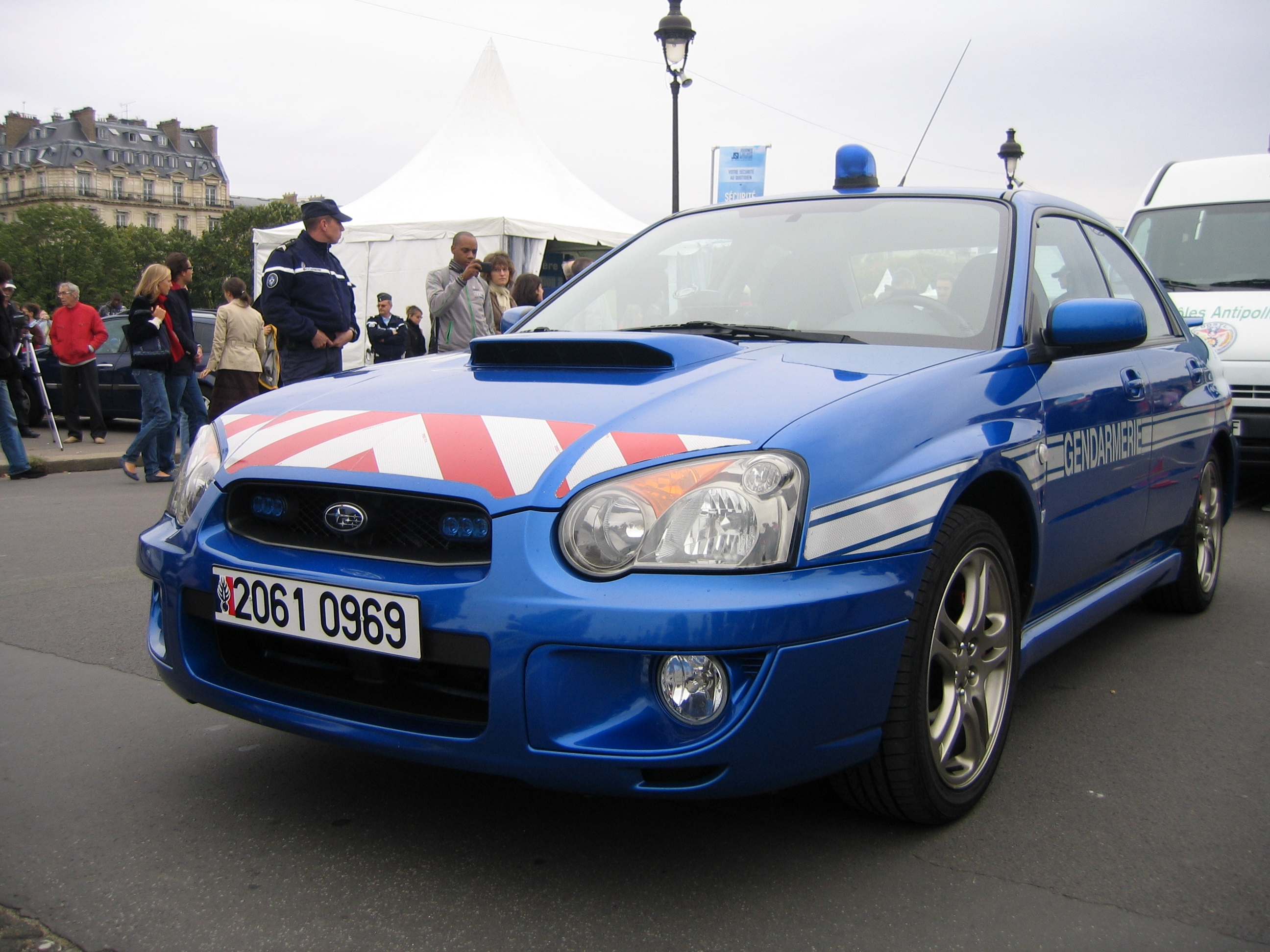
A second generation Subaru Impreza WRX operated by the French National Gendarmerie

Across its years of production, the Subaru Impreza has found use worldwide as a police car by numerous law enforcement agencies, most employing the Impreza WRX for high-speed traffic police and highway patrol duties in both marked and unmarked configurations.

Various models of the Impreza have been used by prefectural police in Japan; Estonia, where 18 Impreza GX were purchased for the Estonian Police in 2003; Latvia, where six unmarked Impreza WRX were acquired for traffic policing use primarily on the outskirts and highways of the capital Riga; Australia, where in 1998, four unmarked Imprezas were first rolled out to Victoria Police, followed by a combination of marked and unmarked Imprezas entering service with the New South Wales Police Force and the Queensland Police Service that same year; France, where 73 Impreza WRXs entered service with the National Gendarmerie's Rapid Intervention Brigades, replacing Peugeot 306 S16s, for use across the French motorway network in March 2006; and Singapore, where eight entered service with the Singapore Police Force in 2006.

In the United Kingdom, marked and unmarked Imprezas were operated by Humberside Police, the first UK force to operate Imprezas with upgrades provided by Prodrive in 1998, North Yorkshire Police, the Hampshire Constabulary, Nottinghamshire Police, Essex Police, one of which was converted to a driving simulator following an accident damaging it beyond repair, and latterly, Greater Manchester Police and the Cumbria Constabulary. In the United States, the police department of the town of Itasca, Illinois, uses a Subaru WRX STI for publicity purposes.

Greenfield, Wisconsin Police Department had a 2012 Subaru WRX STI for publicity and was also used as a patrol unit for 3 years. Mequon, Wisconsin Police Department has had 3 Subaru WRX's (2015, 2017, 2020) over the years that have been changed out one after another for publicity and community outreach but could be used for police use.

== Motorsports ==
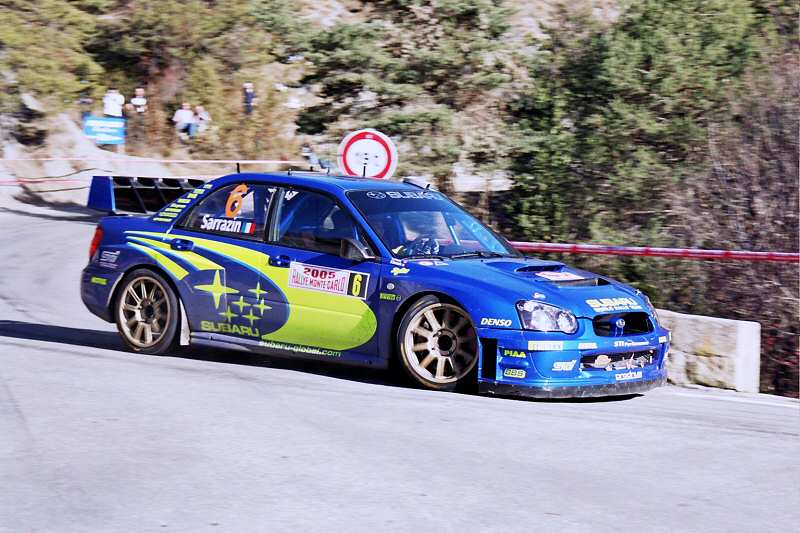
Stéphane Sarrazin driving a Subaru Impreza WRC on the Monte Carlo Rally

The Impreza chassis has been more successful in rallying than Subaru's previous contenders. Prior to the introduction of the Impreza into World Rally Championship racing in 1993, the Subaru World Rally Team had fielded its larger mid-size Legacy. However, with the rest of the rally competition increasingly shifting towards smaller and lighter chassis, Subaru introduced the smaller Impreza, immediately achieving a podium on its debut on the 1993 1000 Lakes Rally. To jumpstart its early rally efforts, and to develop the Impreza into a competitive rally car, Subaru teamed up with preparatory firm and British motorsports company Prodrive, in 1989.

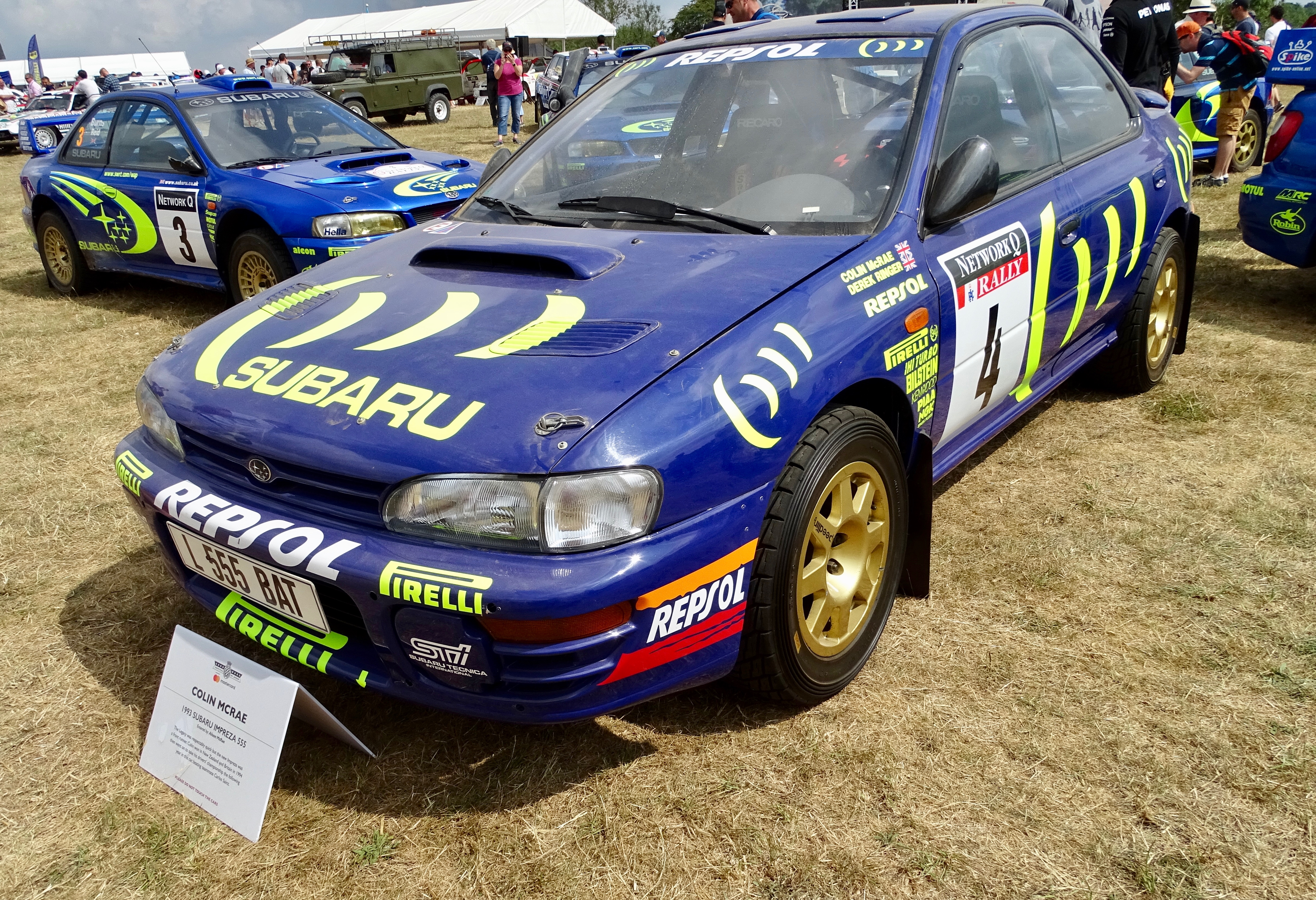
Colin McRae's 1993 Subaru Impreza

Immediately following the first overall WRC event win for both the fledgling Subaru team and its young driver, the late Colin McRae aboard a Group A Legacy on the 1993 Rally New Zealand, the Scotsman's teammate and childhood idol, 1981 World Rally Champion, Ari Vatanen of Finland, went on to finish second in the debut rally of the first ever factory Impreza. New recruit for the following season, 1990 and 1992 World Champion, Carlos Sainz brought the Impreza its inaugural victory on the 1994 Acropolis Rally.

The Impreza brought Subaru three consecutive WRC constructors' titles (1995–1997, the latter season the first for the newly introduced World Rally Car class) and a driver's championship for McRae in 1995, the late Richard Burns in 2001, and the Norwegian, Petter Solberg in 2003.

Another evolution of the Impreza WRC made its debut in the 2007 Corona Rally Mexico. Unfortunately, the team had several major problems with reliability as the car experienced mechanical difficulties in almost every rally from its first.

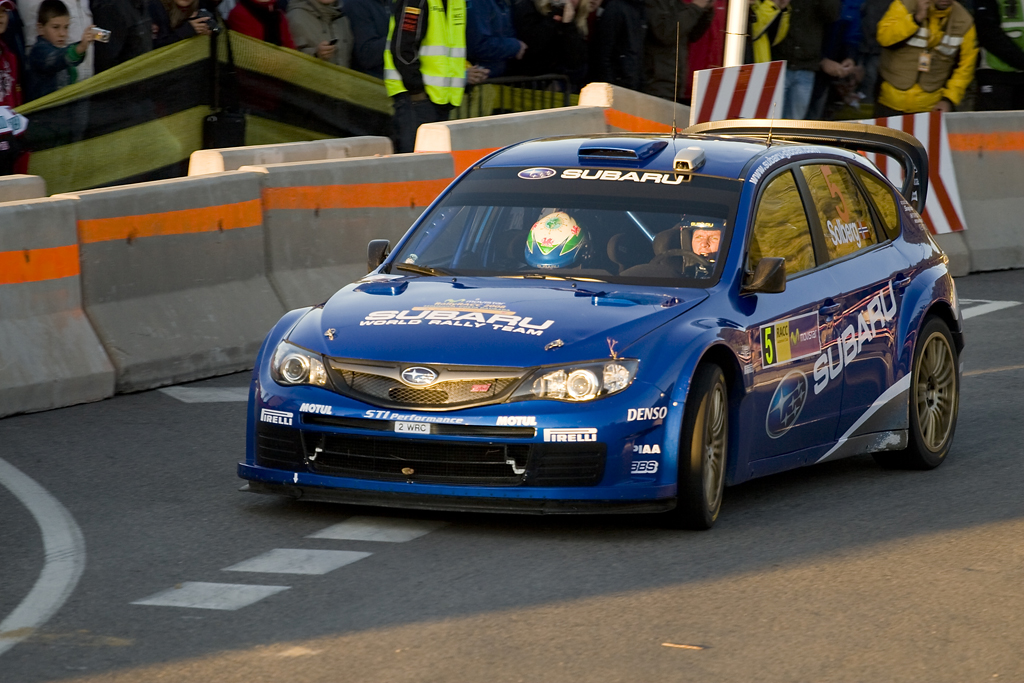
Petter Solberg's Subaru Impreza WRC 2008 at the 2008 Rally Catalunya

Subaru debuted an Impreza WRC in hatchback form for the first time from the 2008 Acropolis Rally onwards, on which event Solberg scored a second-place finish. On 16 December 2008 Subaru announced that it would withdraw from the World Rally Championship due to economic problems. The Impreza holds the record for the most WRC event wins, tied with the Lancia Delta.

However, the Subaru Rally Team USA is still competing in the Rally America National Championship. Also, there are still several teams using Subaru models in the Intercontinental Rally Challenge. Starting in 2006, Subaru of America (SOA), as the official distributor of Subaru vehicles in the United States, participates in the Subaru Road Racing Team (SRRT) with a Subaru Legacy 2.5 GT Spec-B in the Grand-Am Street Tuner class. In 2010, SRRT campaigns a Subaru Impreza WRX STI in the Grand Sport class. In 2011, SRRT switched from the hatchback to a 2011 Subaru Impreza WRX STI sedan.

Possum Bourne won the Silverstone Race to the Sky in 2001. David Higgins won the Mount Washington Hillclimb Auto Race in 2011 and 2014.

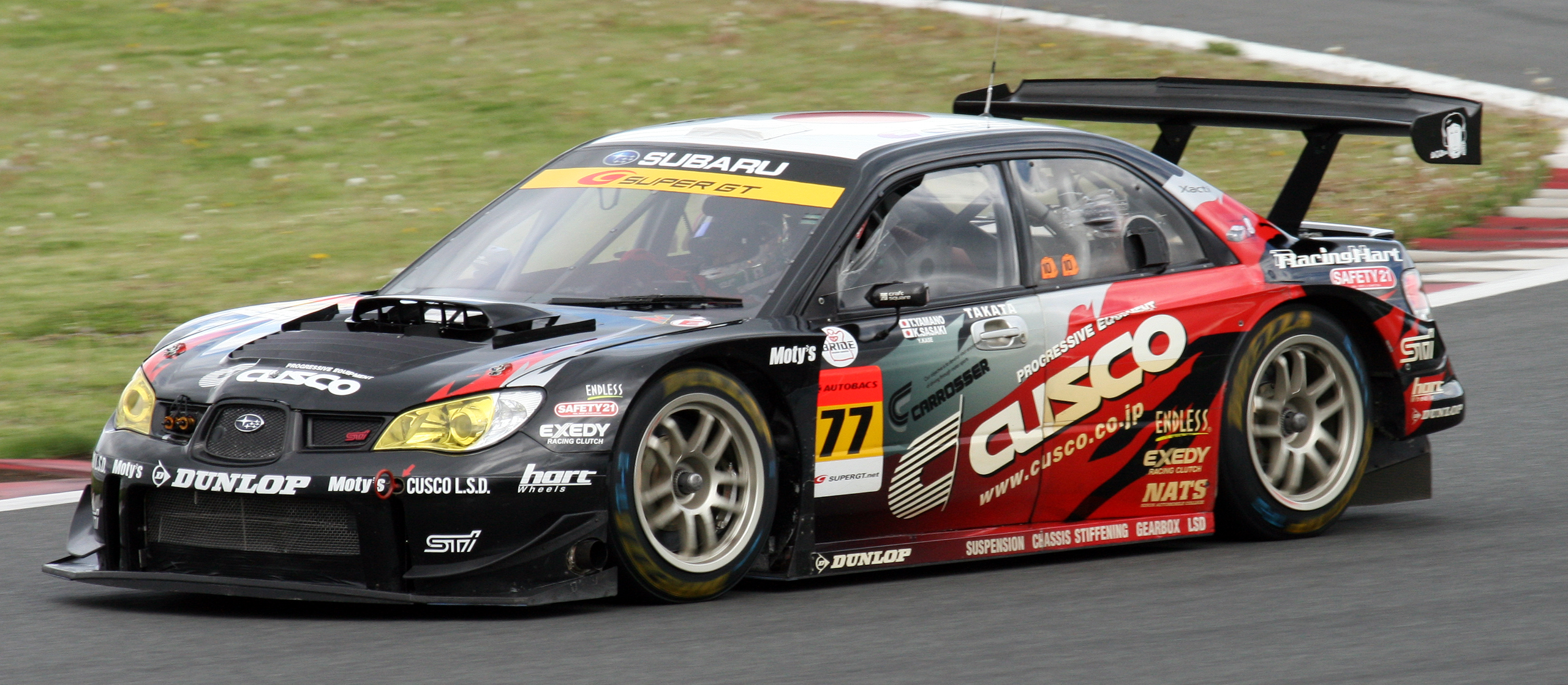
Subaru Impreza GT300 in 2008.

From 2005 to 2008, the Cusco team entered into the Super GT championship using an Impreza, being the only team to do so using a 4WD car.

Nobushige Kumakubo won the 2006 D1 Grand Prix season using a rear-wheel drive Impreza GDB. Stephan Verdier was Formula D's Most Improved Driver of 2008, with Eric O'Sullivan winning Rookie of the Year in 2009.

Justin Hemmes win the 2004 Australian GT Performance Car Championship. Compass 360 Racing used an Impreza in the Canadian Touring Car Championship in 2010, with Roger Ledoux winning the title for Lachute Performance in 2014 and 2015. Other teams entering the GTS category of the 2014 Pirelli World Challenge season, the 1998 Japanese Touring Car Championship and the 2016 TCR International Series.

In April 2010, a modified third-generation WRX STI driven by Tommi Mäkinen set a lap time of 7:55 on the Nürburgring Nordschleife, which is a record for a 4-door car. The Subaru Road Racing Team debuted the Impreza WRX STI hatchback and switched to Impreza WRX STI sedan in 2011 participated to the GRAND-AM Continental Tire Sports Car Challenge series.

In 2011, Mark Higgins used a stock Impreza to set a lap record at the Isle of Man TT course. In 2016, Higgins again broke the record in a modified WRX STI.

In May 2012, Subaru Rally Team USA announced that a new rallycross team, Subaru Puma Rallycross Team USA will participate in the 2012 Global RallyCross Championship season with Dave Mirra, Bucky Lasek, and Sverre Isachsen. They also competed in the 2014 FIA World Rallycross Championship.

The 2014 Alcan Winter Rally was won by a Subaru Impreza winning first in its class and taking first place in the overall race, continuing the winning tradition begun with the Legacy in 1990.

The car has also been used in endurance racing, having had class wins at the 2011 24 Hours of Nürburgring, the 1995 Eastern Creek 12 Hour, and the Bathurst 12 Hour in 1994 and 2007 and 2009. Hitoshi Goto won the 2017 Super Taikyu Series, finishing on the podium in every race.

The car won the Targa New Zealand three times, the Targa Newfoundland four times and the Targa Tasmania three times.

=== Rally championship victories ===
Individual event wins are too numerous to mention. Below is a list of championships won.

Championship	Titles	Years
African Rally Championship	16	1996–2013
American National Championship	7	2017–2024
Asia-Pacific Rally Championship	8	1994–2009
Australian Rally Championship	12	1996–2016
Belgian Rally Championship	1	2008
British Rally Championship	2	2006–2010
Canadian Rally Championship	16	1993–2022
Central European Zone Rally Championship	4	2005–2012
China Rally Championship	4	2005–present
Codasur South American Rally Championship	6	2004–2010
Czech Rally Championship	2	2001–2014
Deutsche Rallye Meisterschaft	3	1998–2011
European Rally Championship	2	1997–1998
Finnish Rally Championship	1	2009
French Rally Championship	2	2002–2004
Hungarian Rally Championship	3	1998–2009
Irish Tarmac Rally Championship	11	1996–2014
Italian Rally Championship	3	1997–2005
Japanese Rally Championship	21 (12 overall titles)	1993–2020
Lebanese Rally Championship	1	1996
Middle East Rally Championship	8	2003–2010
New Zealand Rally Championship	12	2001–2019
Production World Rally Championship	6	2003–2011
Rajdowe Samochodowe Mistrzostwa Polski	9	1999–2013
Rally America	11	2005–2016
Romanian Rally Championship	1	2007
SCCA ProRally	1	2001
Scottish Rally Championship	10	1997–2016
Slovak Rally Championship	1	2005
Swiss Rally Championship	2	2004–2009
Victorian Rally Championship	5	2004–2013
World Rally Championship	6	1995–2003
Total		183

=== Touring Car Racing ===
An estate version of the Impreza raced in the Japanese Touring Car Championship in the 1996 and 1998 Seasons.

== Sales ==
Calendar Year	Impreza (US)	WRX/WRX STI (US)	Canada sales	Impreza series (Japan)
2007	46,333 (combined)		7,480	
2008	49,098 (combined)		8,555	
2009	46,611 (combined)		9,126	
2010	36,072	8,323	8,658	
2011	27,391	13,805	7,664	21,669
2012	68,175	13,624	11,213	52,017
2013	58,856	17,969	9,911	58,243
2014	57,996	25,492	10,157	45,841
2015	66,785	See WRX sales	11,084	44,024
2016	55,238	See WRX sales	7,709	42,423
2017	86,043	See WRX sales	10,617	73,171
2018	76,400	See WRX sales	9,356	54,194
2019	66,415	See WRX sales	9,065	43,780
2020	43,628	See WRX sales	5,732	36,658
2021	34,791	See WRX sales	4,416	26,854
2022	30,846	See WRX sales		23,042
2023	34,719	See WRX sales		34,371
2024	31,366	See WRX sales	3,276	
2025	27,942	See WRX sales		

== Bibliography ==
- Long, Brian (2006). Subaru Impreza: The Road Car and WRC Story. Veloce Publishing. ISBN 9781845840280.
