= Power Shift (disambiguation) =

Power Shift or Powershift may refer to:

- Powershift (book), a 1990 futurology book by Alvin Toffler
- Power Shift (conference), an annual youth summit on climate change
- Power Shift Network, an American nonprofit organization
- Powershifting, a driving technique
- Ford PowerShift transmission
- John Deere Powershift transmission
