= Powershifting =

Driving technique

Powershifting, also known as full-throttle shifting or flat-shifting, is a method of gear shifting used with manual transmissions to reduce the time where the driving wheels are not powered.

Unlike during a normal gear change, in a powershift the driver does not let off the accelerator. The clutch is briefly depressed while the shift lever is rapidly shifted into a higher gear, keeping the engine in its power band (unlike speed-shifting, where the throttle is let off very quickly, simultaneously depressing the clutch and shifting into the next gear).

Keeping the engine in its power band allows it to put down power quicker when the clutch is re-engaged and power returns to the transmission. In a lot of powershift setups there is also a method of cutting the ignition or fuel delivery in a manner similar to a rev limiter, which prevents the engine from over-revving when the load from the transmission is removed. Many aftermarket engine management systems provide this functionality as either a standard feature or as an option, usually combined with launch control.

== See also ==
- Shift kit
- Shift time
