= Power band =

Range of efficient operating speeds of an engine or motor

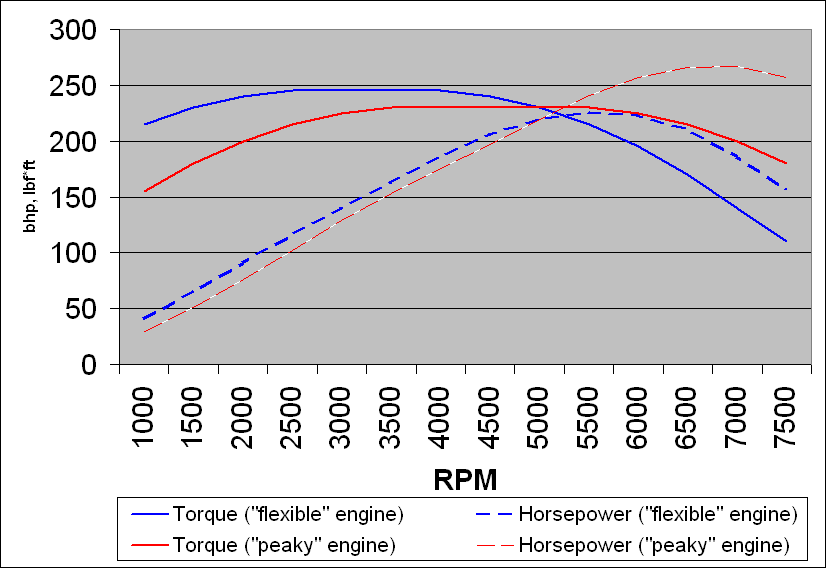
A diagram comparing the power and torque of a "torquey" engine versus a "peaky" one

Turning moment diagram for a four stroke internal combustion engine 4T and 2T: A) intake (4T); piston return to TDC (2T) B) compression (4T); piston descent at PMI (2T) C) expansion D) exhaust α) time average engine

The power band of an internal combustion engine or electric motor is the range of operating speeds under which the engine or motor is able to output the most power, that is, the maximum energy per unit of time. This usually means that maximum acceleration can be achieved inside this band (often at the cost of lower efficiency). While engines and motors have a large range of operating speeds, the power band is usually a much smaller range of engine speed, only half or less of the total engine speed range (electric motors are an exception—see the section on electric motors below).

Specifically, power band is the range of RPM around peak power output. The power band of an internal combustion gasoline automobile engine typically starts at midrange engine speeds (around 4,000 RPM) where maximum torque is produced, and ends below the redline after reaching maximum power (typically between 6,200 RPM and 6,800 RPM). Diesel engines in cars and small trucks may develop maximum torque below 2,000 RPM with the power peak ~ 4,000 RPM or below.

== Applications ==
A mechanical transmission with a selection of different gear ratios is designed to make satisfactory power available over the full range of vehicle speeds. The goal of the selection of gear ratios is to keep the engine operating in its power band. The narrower the band, the more gears are needed, closer together in ratio. By careful gear selection, an engine can be operated in its power band, throughout all vehicle speeds. Such use prevents the engine from labouring at low speeds, or exceeding recommended operating speeds.

A narrow power band is often compensated for by a power-splitting device such as a clutch or torque converter to efficiently achieve a wide range of speeds. A continuously variable transmission can also avoid the issues of a narrow power band by keeping the engine running at an optimal speed.

=== Internal combustion engines ===
In typical combustion engines found in vehicles, the torque is low at idling speed, reaches a maximal value between 1,500 and 6,500 RPM, and then falls more or less sharply toward the redline. Below the RPM of maximal torque, the intake air velocity and thus mixing of air and fuel is not ideal. Above this speed several factors start to limit the torque, such as growing friction, the required time for closing the valves and combustion, and insufficient intake flow. Due to increasing vibration and heat, an external RPM limitation may also be installed. Power is the product of torque multiplied by speed of rotation (analogous to force multiplied by speed in a linear system), so peak power is produced in the upper speed range where there's both high torque and high RPM.

In turbocharged and supercharged engines with potential for abundant torque, an intake pressure regulation system often limits torque to a near-constant figure across the engine speed range to reduce stresses on the engine and provide consistent handling without decreasing peak power.

==== Petrol engines ====
Powerbands can surpass 14,000 RPM in motorcycles and some racing automobiles, such as Formula One cars. Such high speeds are reached by using lightweight pistons and connecting rods with short strokes to reduce inertia, and thus stresses on parts. Advances in valve technology similarly reduce valve float at such speeds. As an engine grows larger (its stroke in particular), its power band moves to lower speeds.

In more common applications, a modern, well designed and engineered fuel-injected, computer-controlled, multi-valve and optionally variable-valve timing-equipped gasoline engine using good fuel can achieve remarkable flexibility in automobile applications, with sufficient torque even at low engine speeds and a relatively flat power output from 1,500 to 6,500 RPM, allowing easy cruising and forgiving low-speed behaviour. However, achieving maximum power for strong acceleration or high road speed still requires high RPM. Though the literal power band covers most of the operating RPM range, particularly in first gear (as there is no lower gear to shift down to, and no "flat spot" in which the engine does not produce any power), the effective band changes in each gear, becoming the range limited at the upper end by either the limiter, or a point roughly located between peak power and the redline where power drops off, and at the lower end the engine's idling speed.

==== Diesel engines ====
A typical road-going ("high-speed") diesel has a narrower band, generating peak torque at lower RPM (often 1,500–2,000 RPM) but also with a sharper fall-off below this, and reaching peak power around 3500-4500 RPM, again rapidly losing strength above this speed. Turbocharged diesel engines with turbo lag (narrowed, exaggerated power band intrinsic to most turbocharged engines) may display this characteristic even more markedly. Therefore, the manufacturer's (or purchaser's/modifier's) choice of gearing, and appropriate use of the available ratios, is even more crucial to make best use of the available power and avoid being "bogged down" in flat spots.

Larger diesel engines in locomotives and some watercraft use diesel-electric drives. This eliminates the complexities of extremely low gearing, as described below.

The largest ("low-speed") diesels—large generators on land and marine diesels at sea—may turn at only hundreds of RPM or even below, with idling speeds of 20-30 RPM. These engines are usually two-stroke diesel engines.

=== Electric motors ===
Electric motors are unique in many ways, especially when it comes to the power band. The exact characteristics vary greatly with the type of electric motor. The maximum torque of a universal motor (vacuum cleaner, small machines, drills, starter motors) occurs at zero rotation rate (when stalled) and falls for higher RPM. For induction motors connected to a fixed frequency AC source (most common in large applications), the maximum torque is usually just below the synchronous RPM, sinks to zero for this RPM and becomes negative above it (induction generator); at low RPM the torque is usually slightly lower. Synchronous motors can be used only at the AC source synchronous velocity. In modern applications, synchronous and induction motors with electronic control of the frequency are used, e.g., brushless DC electric motors. In this case, unless external limitations are applied, the maximum torque is achieved at low RPM.

For example, the AC motor found in the Tesla Roadster (2008) produces near constant maximum torque from 0 to about 6000 RPM, while maximum power occurs at about 10000 RPM, long after torque begins to drop off. The Roadster's redline is 14000 RPM. Other electric motors may in fact produce maximum torque throughout their entire operating range, although their maximum operating speed may be limited for improved reliability.

=== Gas turbines ===
Gas turbines operate at extremely high RPM by comparison, and exhibit narrow powerbands, and poor throttleability and throttle response.

== Redline ==
The redline is the maximum engine speed at which an internal combustion engine or traction motor and its components are designed to operate without causing damage to the components themselves or other parts of the engine. The redline of an engine depends on various factors such as stroke, mass of the components, displacement, composition of components, and balance of components.

Redlining is riding or driving an automotive vehicle above the redline. The actual term redline comes from the red bars that are displayed on tachometers in cars starting at the rpm that denotes the redline for the specific engine. Straying into this area usually does not mean instant engine failure, but may increase the chances of damaging the engine.

=== Variation of redline ===
The acceleration, or rate of change in piston velocity, is the limiting factor. The piston acceleration is directly proportional to the magnitude of the G-forces experienced by the piston-connecting rod assembly. As long as the G-forces acting on the piston-connecting rod assembly multiplied by their own mass is less than the compressive and tensile strengths of the materials they are constructed from and as long as it does not exceed the bearing load limits, the engine can safely turn without succumbing to physical or structural failure.

Redlines vary anywhere from a few hundred revolutions per minute (rpm) (in very large engines such as those in trains and generators) to more than 10,000 rpm (in smaller, usually high-performance engines such as motorcycles, some sports cars, and pistonless rotary engines). Diesel engines normally have lower redlines than comparably sized gasoline engines, largely because of fuel-atomization limitations; even a small diesel engine, such as a Yanmar 2GM20 found on a sailboat, has a redline of 3400 rpm continuous, with a maximum 1-hour rating of 3600 rpm. Gasoline automobile engines typically will have a redline at between 6000 and 7000 rpm. The Gordon Murray Automotive T.50 has the highest redline of a piston-engine road car rated at 12,100 rpm. The Renesis in the Mazda RX-8 has the highest redline of a production wankel rotary-engine road car rated at 9000 rpm.

In contrast, some older OHV (pushrod) engines had redlines as low as 4800 rpm, mostly due to the engines being designed and built for low-end power and economy during the late 1960s all the way to the early 1990s. One main reason OHV engines have lower redlines is valve float. At high speeds, the valve spring simply cannot keep the tappet or roller on the camshaft. After the valve opens, the valve spring does not have enough force to push the mass of the rocker arm, pushrod, and lifter down on the cam before the next combustion cycle. Flathead engines can have even lower redlines; for example, the Universal Atomic 4, commonly used as auxiliary power on sailboats from the 1950s to the 1980s, has a redline of just 3500 rpm. Overhead cam engines eliminate many of the components and moving mass, used on OHV engines. Lower redlines, however, do not necessarily mean lower performance.

Motorcycle engines can have even higher redlines because of their comparatively lower reciprocating mass. For example, the 1986–1996 Honda CBR250RR has a redline of about 19,000 rpm. Higher yet have been the redlines of some Formula One cars, with engine speeds reaching over 20,000 rpm on the Cosworth and Renault 2.4-liter V8 engines during the 2006 season.

== See also ==
- Combined diesel-electric and gas
- Combined diesel or gas
- Combined gas or gas
- Continuously variable transmission
- Engine tuning
- Overdrive (mechanics)
- Shift kit
- Shift time
