= Lamborghini Countach =

Sports car produced by Lamborghini (1974–1990)

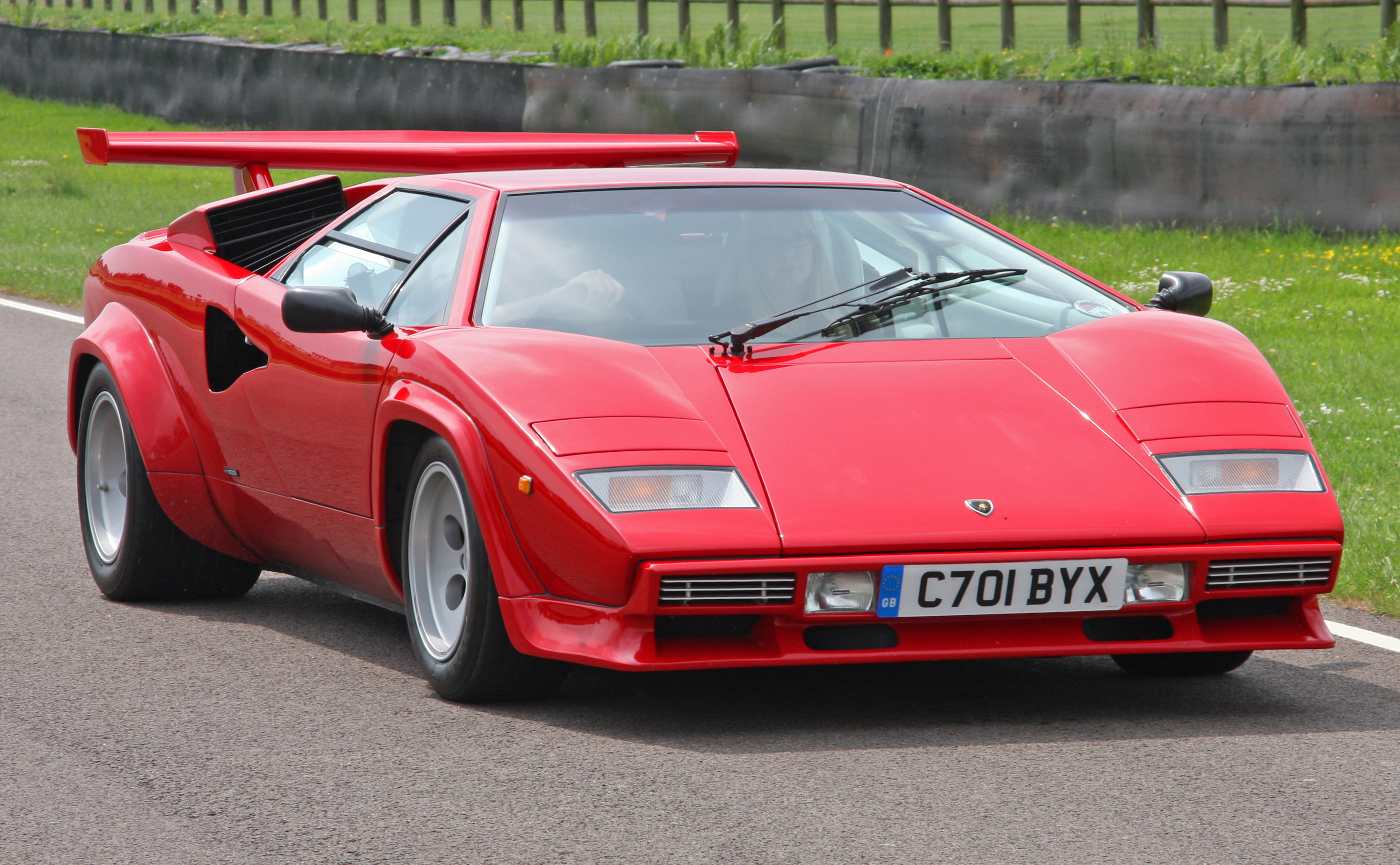
- Lamborghini Countach LP5000 QV

Overview
- Manufacturer: Lamborghini
- Production: 1974–1990
- Assembly: Italy: Sant'Agata Bolognese
- Designer: Marcello Gandini at Bertone

Body and chassis
- Class: Sports car (S)
- Body style: 2-door coupe
- Layout: Longitudinal mid-engine, rear-wheel-drive
- Doors: Scissor
- Related: Lamborghini LM002

Powertrain
- Engine: Lamborghini V12: LP400, LP400 S: 3.9 L (3,929 cc); LP500 S: 4.8 L (4,754 cc); 5000 QV, 25th Anniversary: 5.2 L (5,167 cc)
- Transmission: 5-speed synchromesh manual

Dimensions
- Wheelbase: 2,450 mm (96.46 in)
- Length: 4,140 mm (162.99 in)
- Width: LP 400: 1,887 mm (74.28 in); Rest: 2,000 mm (78.7 in)
- Height: 1,070 mm (42.13 in)
- Kerb weight: 1,300.5 kg (2,867 lb) (LP400); 1,351 kg (2,978 lb) (LP400S); 1,488 kg (3,280 lb) (LP5000QV)

Chronology
- Predecessor: Lamborghini Miura
- Successor: Lamborghini Diablo (direct); Lamborghini Countach LPI 800-4 (nameplate)

The Lamborghini Countach (/ˈkuːntɑːʃ/ KOON-tahsh) is a rear mid-engine, rear-wheel-drive sports car produced by the Italian automobile manufacturer Lamborghini from 1974 until 1990. It is one of the many exotic designs developed by Italian design house Bertone, which pioneered and popularized the sharply angled "Italian Wedge" shape.

The wedge style was introduced to the public in 1970 with the Lancia Stratos Zero concept car. The first showing of the Countach prototype was at the 1971 Geneva Motor Show, as the Lamborghini LP500 concept.

The "Countach" nameplate was reused for the Sián-based limited-production hybrid-electric model called the Countach LPI 800-4 in 2021.

== Design and development ==
The development of the Countach was initiated by Ferruccio Lamborghini with the goal of creating a successor to the Miura. The Miura was widely acclaimed after its introduction in 1966, but by 1970 new competitors including the Ferrari Daytona had been introduced to the market, and the Miura was showing its age. Chief engineer Paolo Stanzani and his staff began work on the Miura successor in 1970 under the project name "LP112." From the beginning of the project, Stanzani's collaborators included test driver Bob Wallace, assistant engineer Massimo Parenti and designer Marcello Gandini of Bertone.

Stanzani and Ferruccio Lamborghini agreed that the Miura's successor required a mechanical design that enabled the greatest possible performance as well as a body that was both aerodynamically efficient and aesthetically daring. These principles had formed the Miura's development and enabled the commercial success of that model. Despite Mr. Lamborghini's preference for comfortable grand tourers, he recognized the commercial value of a more uncompromising sports car like the Miura and gave Stanzani's team permission to further push boundaries with the LP112 project. The resulting Countach incorporated successful aspects of the Miura, such as the rear mid-engine, rear wheel drive layout along with many new engineering and styling innovations. Lamborghini's engineering team addressed several flaws in the Miura design, improving high-speed stability and reducing lift-off oversteer as well as addressing the limited maintenance access, uneven weight distribution and cooling issues endemic to the Miura's transverse engine layout.

After a year of intensive development work, the first Countach prototype, designated LP500, was shown to the public at the 1971 Geneva Motor Show. Subsequently, the Lamborghini engineering team spent three years refining this radical prototype into the production-ready LP400 Countach, which debuted in 1974.

=== Name ===
The Countach name originated in late 1970 or 1971, near the beginning of the LP112 project. Most previous and subsequent Lamborghini car names are associated with famous bulls and bullfighting, but the Countach broke with this tradition. The name originated from the word contacc (pronounced [kʊŋˈtɑtʃ]), an exclamation of astonishment in the Piedmontese language.

Marcello Gandini, the designer of the Countach, explained the origin of the name:

When we made cars for the car shows, we worked at night and we were all tired, so we would joke around to keep our morale up. There was a profiler working with us who made the locks. He was two meters tall with two enormous hands, and he performed all the little jobs. He spoke almost only Piedmontese, didn't even speak Italian. Piedmontese is much different from Italian and sounds like French. One of his most frequent exclamations was 'countach', which literally means plague, contagion, and is actually used more to express amazement or even admiration, like 'goodness'. He had this habit.

When we were working at night, to keep our morale up, there was a jousting spirit, so I said we could call it Countach, just as a joke, to say an exaggerated quip, without any conviction. There nearby was Bob Wallace, who assembled the mechanics—we always made the cars operational. At that time you could even roll into the car shows with the car running, which was marvelous.

So jokingly I asked Bob Wallace how it sounded to an Anglo-Saxon ear. He said it in his own way, strangely. It worked. We immediately came up with the writing and stuck it on. But maybe the real suggestion was the idea of one of my co-workers, a young man who said let's call it that. That is how the name was coined. This is the only true story behind this word.

— Marcello Gandini, "Not Just Bulls: The Creator Tells Us the Story Behind the Name Countach"

Lamborghini used a system of alphanumeric designations in order to further delineate Countach models. This designation begins with "LP", an abbreviation of the Italian longitudinale posteriore, meaning "longitudinal rear". This refers to the engine orientation and placement shared by all Countach models. For the prototype and early production models, "LP" was followed by a three digit number designating nominal engine displacement, "400" for 3.9-litre engines and "500" for 4.8 and 5-litre engines. Therefore, the full name of the first production Countach was the Lamborghini Countach LP400. As in the Miura, the letter "S" (short for Sport) was added for later high performance variants. This naming scheme was disrupted by the 1985 LP5000 Quattrovalvole equipped with a 5.2-litre engine, also called the 5000QV. The LP- designation was dropped entirely for the 1988 25th Anniversary Edition, also called the Anniversary.

=== Styling ===
The Countach was styled by Marcello Gandini of the Bertone design studio. His design for the Countach's predecessor, the Miura, achieved commercial success and critical acclaim from the automotive press when it was introduced in March 1966. Following the Miura's debut, Gandini began experimenting with a new, more angular and geometric design language in a series of concept cars for Lamborghini, Alfa Romeo and Lancia. In particular, the 1968 Alfa Romeo Carabo and 1970 Lancia Stratos Zero were direct styling precursors to the Countach. Like the Countach, they were both entirely wedge-shaped, mid-engine designs with a low, flat front, truncated tail and angular details. Both of these concept cars featured unconventional methods of entry into the passenger compartment—a hinged windshield for the Stratos Zero and scissor doors for the Carabo—foreshadowing the scissor doors used on the Countach.

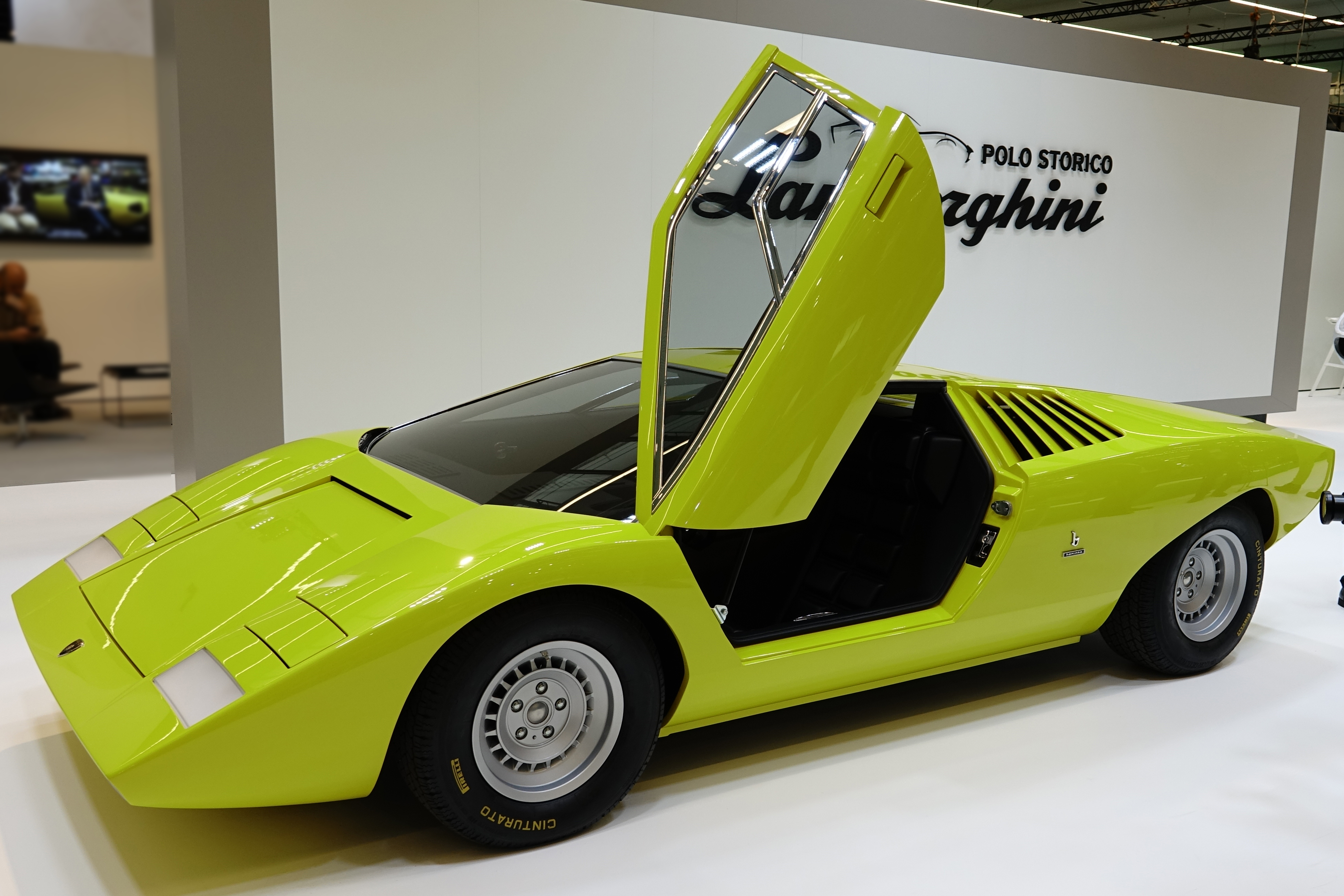
A recreation of the Lamborghini Countach LP500 Prototype at the 2022 Retromobile Autoshow

At the start of the LP112 project in 1970, Lamborghini commissioned Gandini and his team at Bertone to develop a body for the then-unnamed prototype. Chief engineer Paolo Stanzani supplied the design team with chassis information so that body design could proceed while the mechanical details of the prototype were finalised. Shortly before the 1971 Geneva Auto Show, the finished chassis was shipped to Bertone, where the prototype bodywork and interior were installed. The resulting Countach LP500 prototype was unveiled at the 1971 Geneva Auto show, where its unconventional design drew great public interest and extensive press coverage. The LP500 prototype had a crisp, wedge-shaped design that, compared to the Miura, was wide and very low but shorter in overall length. Overall dimensions of the prototype were 185 cm (73 in) wide, 103 cm (41 in) tall, and 401 cm (158 in) long. The nose of the prototype tapered sharply to a thin grille, an uninterrupted slope enabled by headlights in retractable housings that flipped down inside the body when not in use. The prototype's body lacked bumpers, aerodynamic spoilers, side mirrors and any other addition that would have interrupted the lines of Gandini's design. Trapezoidal shapes appeared throughout the body, including in the windshield, side windows, door openings, hood and engine covers and taillights. Air was supplied to the engine and side-mounted radiators through louvered vents immediately behind the side windows, although road testing quickly demonstrated these vents alone were inadequate to control engine temperatures.

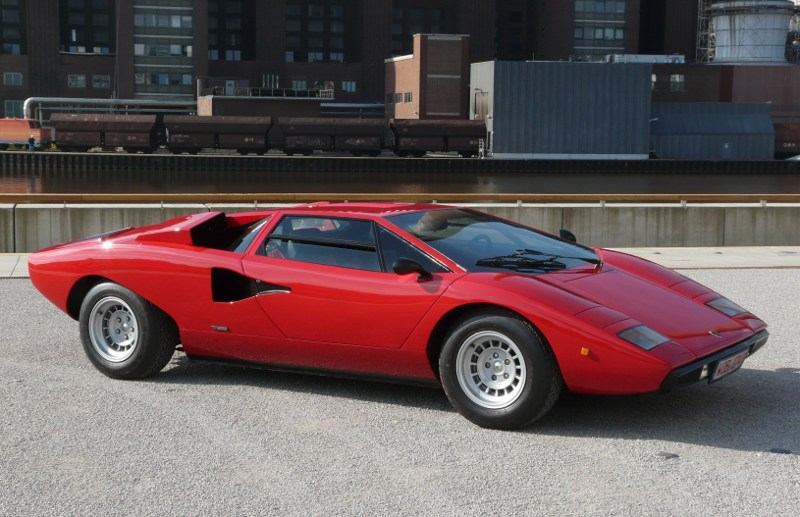
The Countach LP400 was the initial production model

The interior of the prototype was equally notable to contemporary audiences as the exterior, as it incorporated new technologies and bold styling decisions. Gandini initially sketched a dashboard with all-digital readouts for the Countach. This dashboard design was not fully realised in time for the debut, the LP500 prototype instead used a conventional analog speedometer and tachometer. However, the LP500 dashboard incorporated other innovations from Gandini's original sketches, including aircraft or spaceship-inspired warning lights placed centrally on the steering column, within the arc of the steering wheel. One of these warning lights served a similar purpose as a modern automatic cruise control system, illuminating when a set speed was exceeded. Another innovation was the inclusion of an on-board diagnostic system (long before their standardization and widespread adoption) that displayed the status of the car's individual subsystems superimposed on a schematic view of the entire car, located on the dashboard to the driver's left. Due to the poor rearward visibility inherent in the Countach design, a periscope was integrated into the passenger compartment roof, instead of a conventional rear-view mirror. This periscope system was obtained from Donnelly Mirrors, who had first developed it for an ESV project. Gandini also used a single-spoke steering wheel and deeply recessed bucket seats, which shared a stylised motif of segmented blocks. The low seating position, prominent transmission tunnel and wide door sills all contributed to the sensation of being inside a race car cockpit.

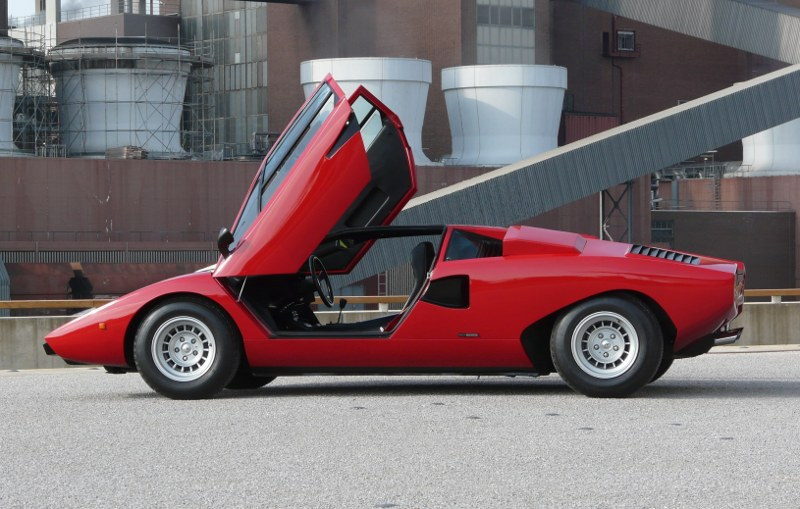
The Countach was the first production car to incorporate scissor doors

The scissor doors of the Countach prototype were a prominent design feature carried over to the production Countach as well as many subsequent Lamborghini models. First appearing on Gandini's 1968 Alfa Romeo Carabo concept car, they attached to the vehicle structure at the front of the door using horizontal hinges, so that they lifted up and tilted forward when opened. The mechanism was assisted by gas struts, which supported the weight of the doors and smoothed the opening and closing motion. Gandini incorporated this door design as both a styling gesture and to facilitate entry. The car's wide chassis and high and wide doorsills made entry using conventional doors difficult in narrow spaces. Conversely, care needed to be taken in opening the scissor doors under low ceilings. Due to poor rearward visibility and the wide sills, many Countach drivers park by opening the door, sitting on the sill, and reversing into the parking spot while looking over the back of the car from outside. The scissor doors made it difficult to exit the car following a rollover accident. Lamborghini engineers studied solutions to this problem including an easily removable "kick-out" windscreen or using explosive bolts to remove the doors following an accident, although neither were incorporated into the production Countach.

Following the LP500 prototype's public debut, the body design was progressively altered during pre-production testing to improve aerodynamic performance, high speed stability, engine cooling and ability to meet mandated safety requirements. This resulted in many differences between the LP500 prototype and the production LP400. The most visible change was the addition of several vents to improve engine cooling and air intake. These included NACA ducts spanning the doors and rear wings on each side and protruding air intake boxes, which replaced the louvered vents behind the side windows. The slope of the nose was made shallower to reduce excessive front-end downforce that destabilized the prototype during braking. The side windows inset with small trapezoidal glass sections were changed to horizontally split two-piece windows with a retractable lower half. Additional small windows were added behind the side windows, slightly improving rearward visibility. The futuristic dashboard and diagnostic displays seen on the prototype were replaced with a conventionally styled dashboard using Stewart-Warner analog gauges, while the single-spoke steering wheel was replaced with a three spoke wheel similar to those used on other production Lamborghinis. The periscope rear-view mirror was retained for the LP400, but for subsequent Countach models it was replaced with conventional rear view mirrors. The overall dimensions of the LP400 were slightly larger than the prototype, at 189 cm (74 in) wide, 107 cm (42 in) tall, and 414 cm (163 in) long.

The styling of the Countach was continually altered as new production models were introduced. Later additions—including flared arches, spoilers, carburetor covers and bumpers—progressively changed the Countach body in order to improve the model's performance, safety and appearance. Despite these updates, the basic shape of the first Countach prototype revealed in 1971 remained virtually unchanged over its 19-year lifespan.

=== Engine and transmission ===
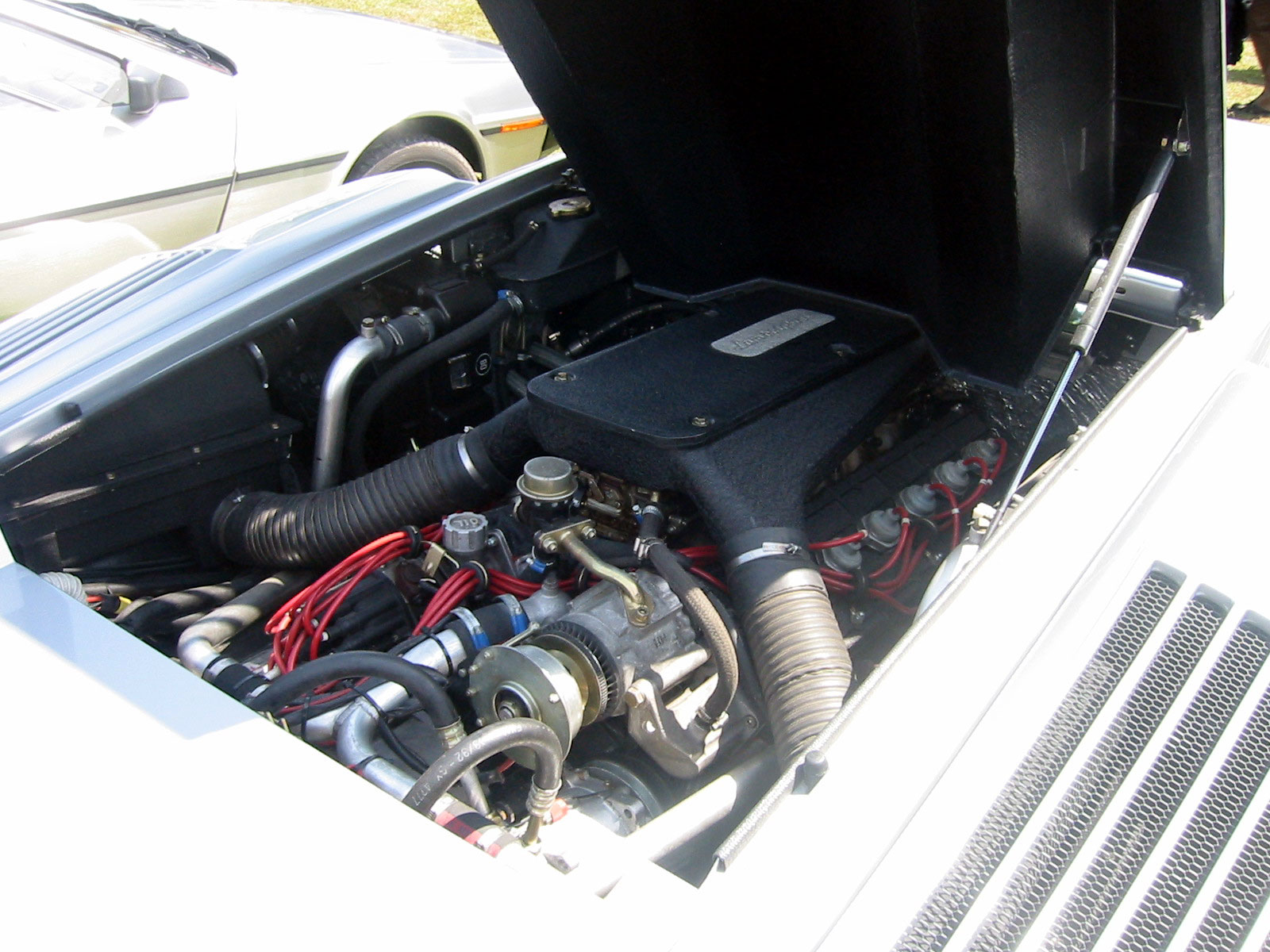
Engine bay of a Countach

The Countach was designed around the existing Lamborghini V12 engine in a rear mid-engine, rear-wheel-drive layout. In contrast to the Miura's transversely mounted engine, the engine in the Countach was longitudinally mounted. This layout was a first for a road-going V12, previously used only in the Ferrari P-series racing cars. However, chief engineer Paolo Stanzani wanted to improve the weight distribution of the car even further and devised a new type of longitudinal layout that would avoid placing the mass of the transmission at the rear of the car. The resulting configuration had the output shaft at the front of the engine, immediately connecting through the clutch assembly to the transmission. The transmission itself was a 5-speed manual with Porsche-type synchromesh and was mounted in the middle of the car between the two seats. The driveshaft ran from the transmission through the engine's oil sump to a differential at the rear. This arrangement effectively sandwiched the length of the engine between the mid-mounted transmission and the rear-mounted differential. This configuration had numerous advantages over the Miura's transverse engine, including an increase in stability from placing more mass near the car's center, a shorter overall wheelbase, a more direct gear-shift linkage for easier and faster shifting, better cooling and easier maintenance access to engine components.

The Lamborghini V12 used in the Countach originated in 1963 and was designed by Giotto Bizzarrini. Versions of this engine were used in preceding and then currently produced Lamborghini models including the 350 GT, 400 GT, Islero, Espada and Miura. As used in the Miura, this engine had a 3,929 cc (3.9 L) displacement, a 60º cylinder bank angle, double overhead camshafts per bank, two valves per cylinder, lubrication and distributor ignition. Paolo Stanzani's engineering team wished to increase the Countach engine's power over the maximum of 279 kW (379 PS; 374 hp) as seen on the Miura SV. The 3.9-litre version had been tuned to be rated approximately between 307–324 kW (417–441 PS; 412–434 hp) in the experimental P400 Jota, but an engine of this specification was expensive to manufacture and was difficult to handle in normal city driving due to lack of low-RPM power. Therefore, the engineers decided to increase the engine's displacement to 5-litre, in order to extract more power while avoiding the usability problems of a race-tuned engine. This increase in displacement would require a major redesign of the existing V12. Lamborghini's plan was to produce the 5-litre engine in time for series production and published specification sheets for the proposed production 5-litre engine at the 1971 debut of the prototype. Lamborghini reported this engine would be rated at 328 kW (446 PS; 440 hp) at 7,400 rpm. One experimental engine was constructed by boring out a conventional 3.9-litre engine block and was fitted to the Countach LP500 prototype for testing purposes. It incorporated many lightweight castings made from Elektron, an expensive magnesium alloy. This engine self-destructed during a 1971 road test by Bob Wallace. This made it clear that further revisions to the basic engine design were required to improve durability. The LP500 prototype was subsequently fitted with a 3.9-litre engine for the remainder of pre-production testing.

The first production cars used a 3.9-litre engine as durability issues with the new 5-litre engine could not be resolved in time. As equipped to the 1974 Countach LP400, the engine was rated at 276 kW (375 PS; 370 hp) at 8,000 rpm. The stated power output was less than that of the Miura SV, which was blamed on the use of side-draft Weber 45 DCOE carburetors instead of the down-draft carburetors used on the Miura. Later engine development eventually increased the engine displacement to 4,754 cc (4.8 L) in the 1982 LP500S, and then to 5,167 cc (5.2 L) with four valves per cylinder in the 1985 LP5000 Quattrovalvole. All variants of the Countach were equipped with six Weber carburetors until the arrival of the LP5000 QV model, some of which used Bosch K-Jetronic fuel injection to meet US emissions regulations. European-specification cars continued to use carburetors until the arrival of the succeeding Diablo.

=== Chassis and body construction ===
Paolo Stanzani and the Lamborghini engineering team developed an all-steel partial space frame chassis for the LP500 Countach prototype. This prototype chassis was constructed of both a steel sheet and square-section steel tubing, with wall thicknesses between 0.8–1.0 mm (0.031–0.039 in). The front section primarily used stamped and spot-welded sheet steel, with certain areas stiffened by stamped ribs and welded reinforcement panels. Stiffening frames constructed of sheet steel and tubing extended through the center of the car, along both door sills and around the central transmission tunnel. The rear section of the chassis consisted of almost entirely square-section tubing and included diagonal bracing and multiple cross-members for strength. This prototype chassis was constructed by Marchesi of Modena, which had produced chassis for earlier Lamborghini models.

The prototype chassis was stiffer and heavier than the Miura chassis. It weighed 107 kg (236 lb), while the Miura's chassis weighed 75 kg (165 lb). The additional weight was partially due to the lack of the lightening holes used in the Miura and partially due to the need to construct an extra-durable chassis for pre-production testing. In addition to the strength and stiffness improvements over the Miura design, engineers believed that greater use of steel tubing would result in a chassis that was easier for the factory to fabricate and easier to protect from corrosion.

Following testing of the LP500 prototype during 1971, Stanzani and his team decided to further revise the chassis design. The dimensions and layout were similar, but the steel sheet and square tube construction used in the prototype was entirely disregarded in favor of a full space frame constructed of welded round-section steel tubing. Compared to the prototype, this design used a much more complex welded assembly of cross-braced tubular frames and was reinforced with sheet metal gussets in a few key areas. Tubes of 30 mm (1.2 in), 25 mm (0.98 in), and 15 mm (0.59 in) diameter were used, all with 1 mm (0.039 in) wall thickness. Overall, this new design was stiffer and weighed less, at 90 kg (198 lb). At the time, this construction technique was used in Formula One but was extremely advanced for a road-going automobile. In addition to the performance benefits of this design, engineers recognized that building a technologically advanced and visually complex chassis would align with Lamborghini's marketing strategy and sell better than a conventional design. The full space frame chassis was tested in a second Countach prototype and would be used basically unchanged on subsequent production cars. Chassis fabrication added a significant amount to the cost of the car as each chassis required laborious hand-welding, first by Marchesi then again during final assembly at the Lamborghini factory. However, logistically this method of fabrication was relatively easy to incorporate into the low-volume, manually skilled production line.

Prototype and production Countach bodies were constructed primarily of unstressed aluminum panels. Stanzani had initially considered fabricating body panels from the lightweight alloy Avional, primarily used in aircraft construction, but found it expensive and difficult to obtain. A more conventional aluminum alloy was used instead. Prototypes used aluminum panels between 1–1.2 mm thick, increased to 1.5 mm (0.059 in) for the production LP400. The aluminum body panels were fabricated by Bertone. These panels were supported by thin steel frames welded to the main chassis. Once the panels were in place, factory workers would then hand-form them in order to adjust the final body shape, surface smoothness and gaps between panels. As the spaceframe chassis did not have an integrated floor panel, a separate fiberglass and aluminum panel was installed underneath the passenger compartment. Although the LP400 used an all-aluminum body, later versions of the Countach would incorporate body components made of fiberglass and carbon composites.

=== Prototypes ===
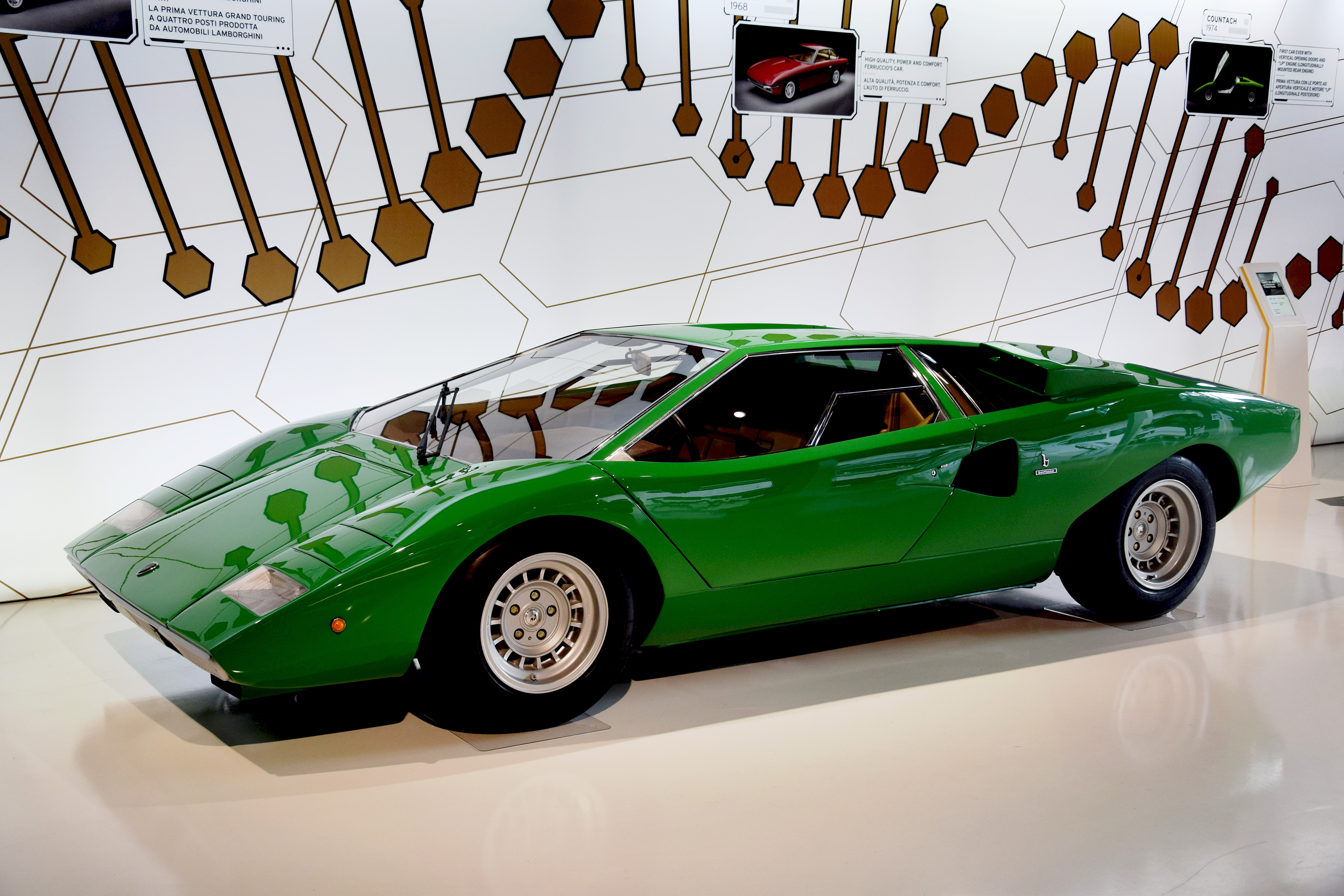
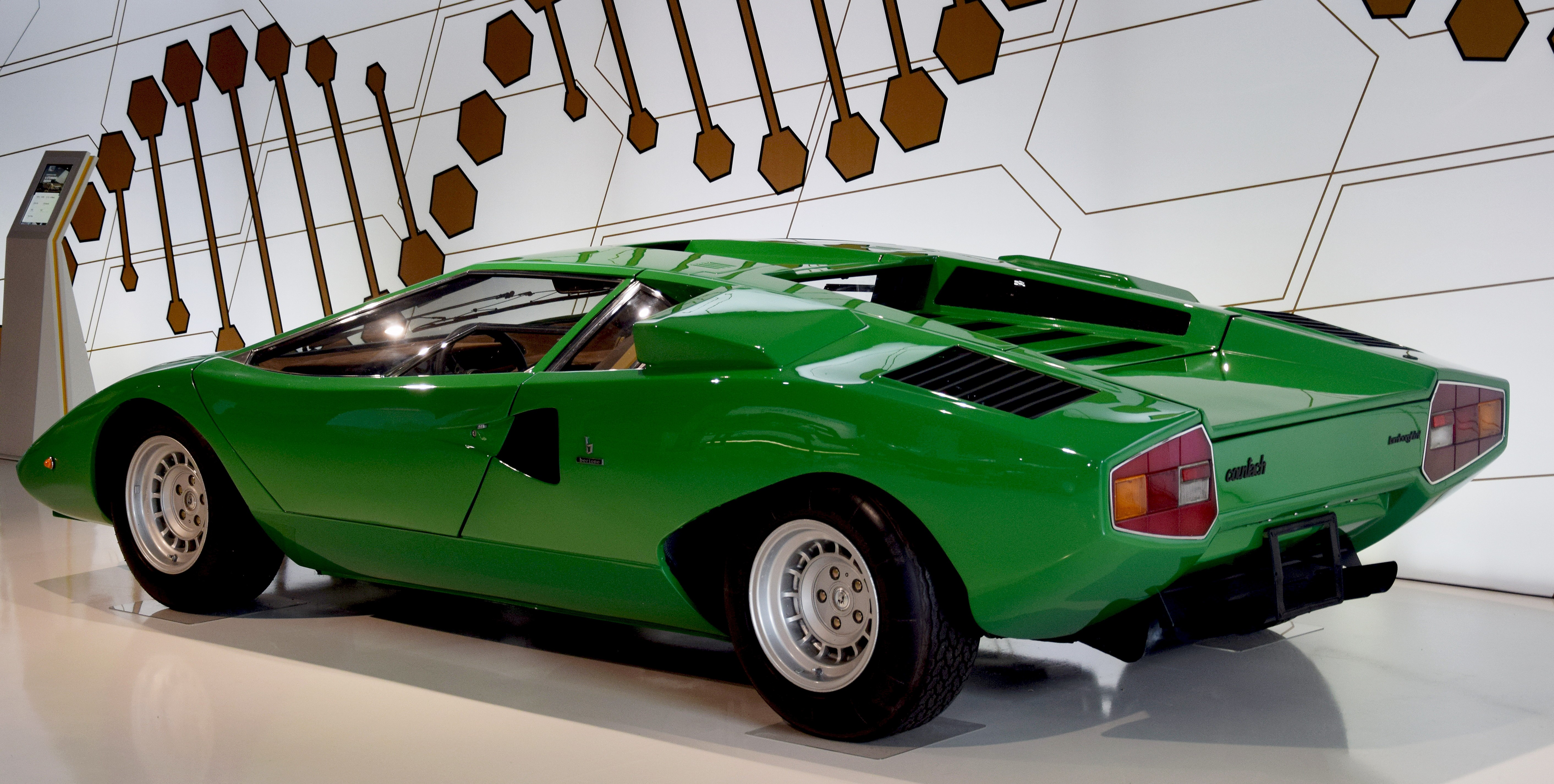
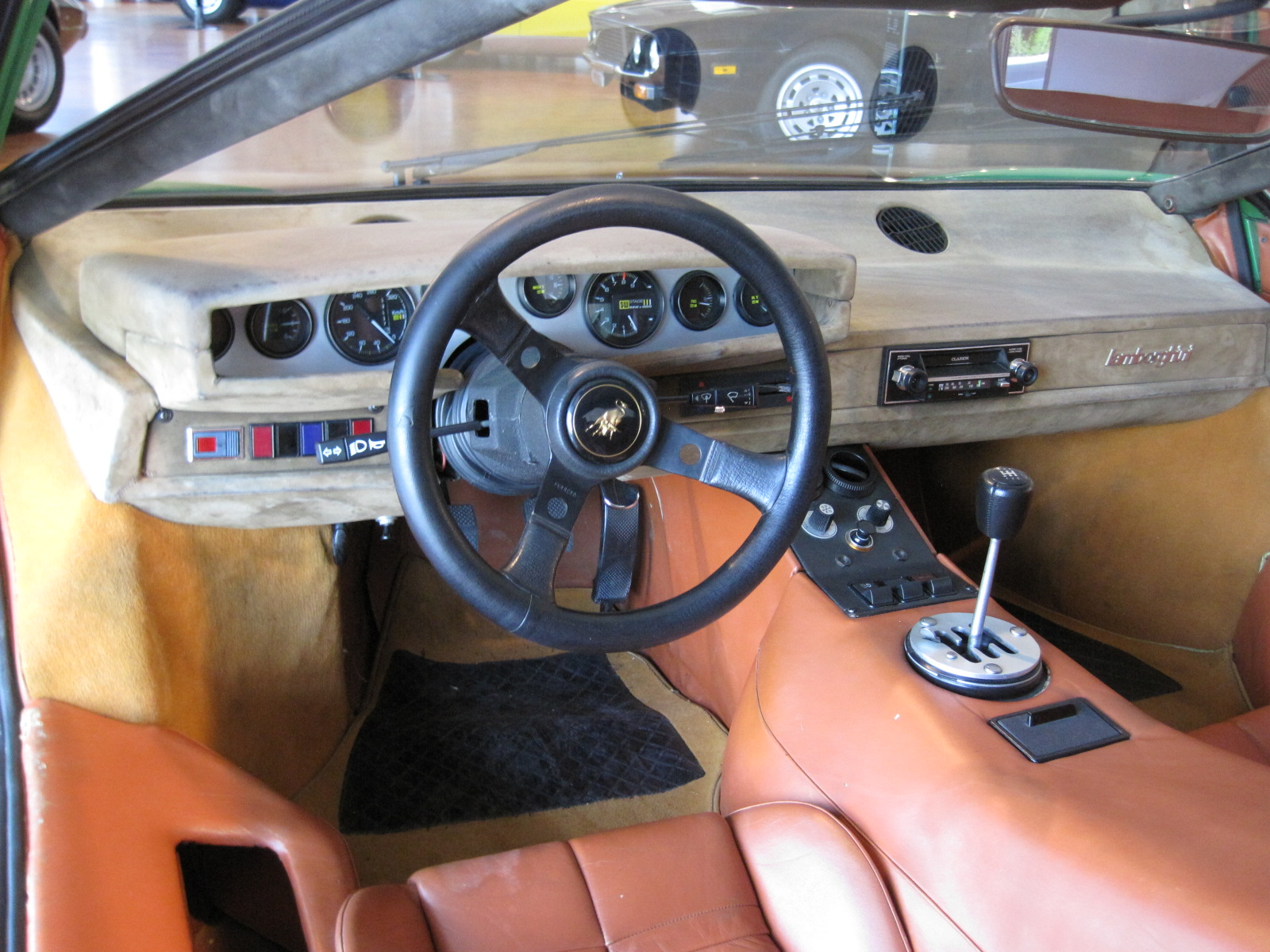
Second Countach prototype (chassis 1120001) at the Lamborghini factory museum

Lamborghini created three pre-production Countach prototypes prior to the introduction of the LP400 production model.

The first prototype was the LP500, which was displayed at the 1971 Geneva Motor Show and later used for pre-production testing and development by the factory. This car had many mechanical and styling differences compared to the production LP400. It was built on a partial spaceframe steel chassis which was heavier and simpler compared to the production version's full tubular spaceframe. The bright yellow bodywork closely followed Gandini's original design for the car but was modified during testing with additional air inlets to improve engine cooling. The 5.0 liter V12 engine initially fitted to the LP500 was destroyed during testing and replaced with a 3.9 liter V12, similar to the engine used on the production LP400. The LP500 prototype was destroyed in a crash test on March 21, 1974 at the MIRA facility in England to gain European type approval, even though its construction method was utterly unlike production vehicles. In 2017, a recreation of the LP500 prototype was constructed by Lamborghini Polo Storico, the Lamborghini factory's restoration division. The completed recreation was first displayed to the public at the 2021 Concorso d'Eleganza Villa d'Este.

The second Countach prototype (chassis number 1120001) was shown to the public at the 1973 Geneva Motor Show (painted red) and at the 1973 Paris Motor Show (painted green). The bodywork of this car was much closer to that of the LP400 production model, and now incorporated the side NACA ducts and air intake boxes tested on the first prototype. This car showed some styling details from the first prototype that would not carry over into production, including trapezoidal windows and a bumperless nose with silver, recessed grille. This was the first car to be equipped with the tubular full spaceframe chassis used on production models. This car was fitted with the 3.9-litre engine, although contemporary press releases still designated it as an "LP500", possibly because Lamborghini engineers still intended to use a 5.0-litre engine in the production version. In addition to appearing at motor shows, Lamborghini engineers used the second prototype for road testing and as a reference to create the wooden master pattern for all body panels. This car currently resides in the Lamborghini factory museum.

The third Countach prototype (chassis number 1120002) was shown at the 1974 Geneva Motor Show and was the first to be constructed entirely in the Lamborghini factory, except for the chassis built by Marchesi. It is sometimes called the first pre-production or first production LP400 Countach. This car was painted bright yellow and had the finalized production LP400 body style, which was 13 centimetres (5.1 in) longer than the previous prototype bodies to increase interior space. The trapezoidal side windows seen in the first prototypes were replaced with a three-panel design, which was easier to manufacture. The wheel arch shape was slightly changed to prevent the rear tyres from rubbing when the suspension was compressed. To improve long-term durability, the thickness of the body sheet metal was increased from 1.2 mm to 1.5 mm and the suspension and gearbox mounting points were made from tubing with a greater wall thickness. The interior was changed to final production form, losing Gandini's electronic diagnostic displays from the first prototype and using instead conventional gauges manufactured by Stewart-Warner.

== Production history ==
=== LP400 (1974–1978) ===
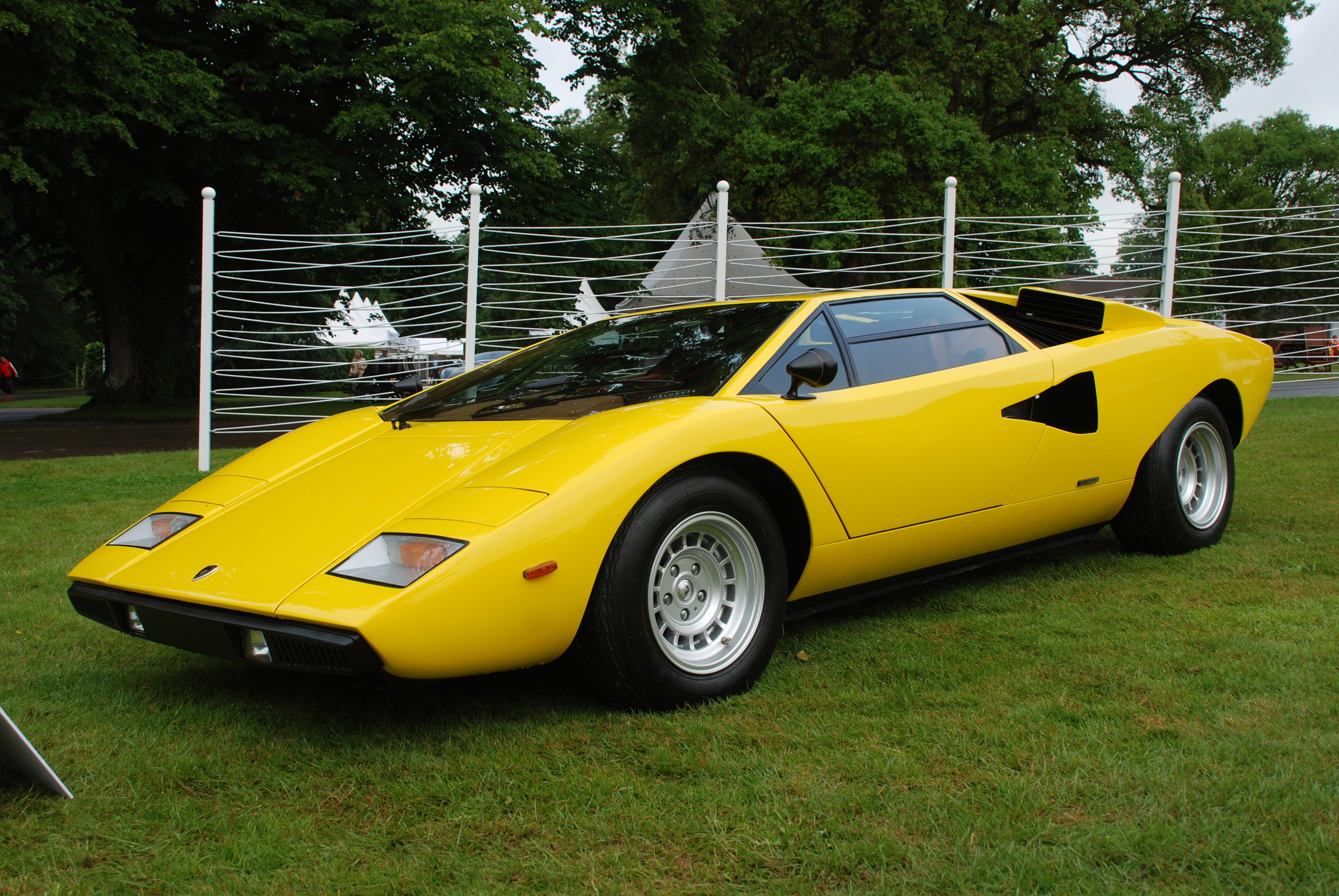
Countach LP400 (front)

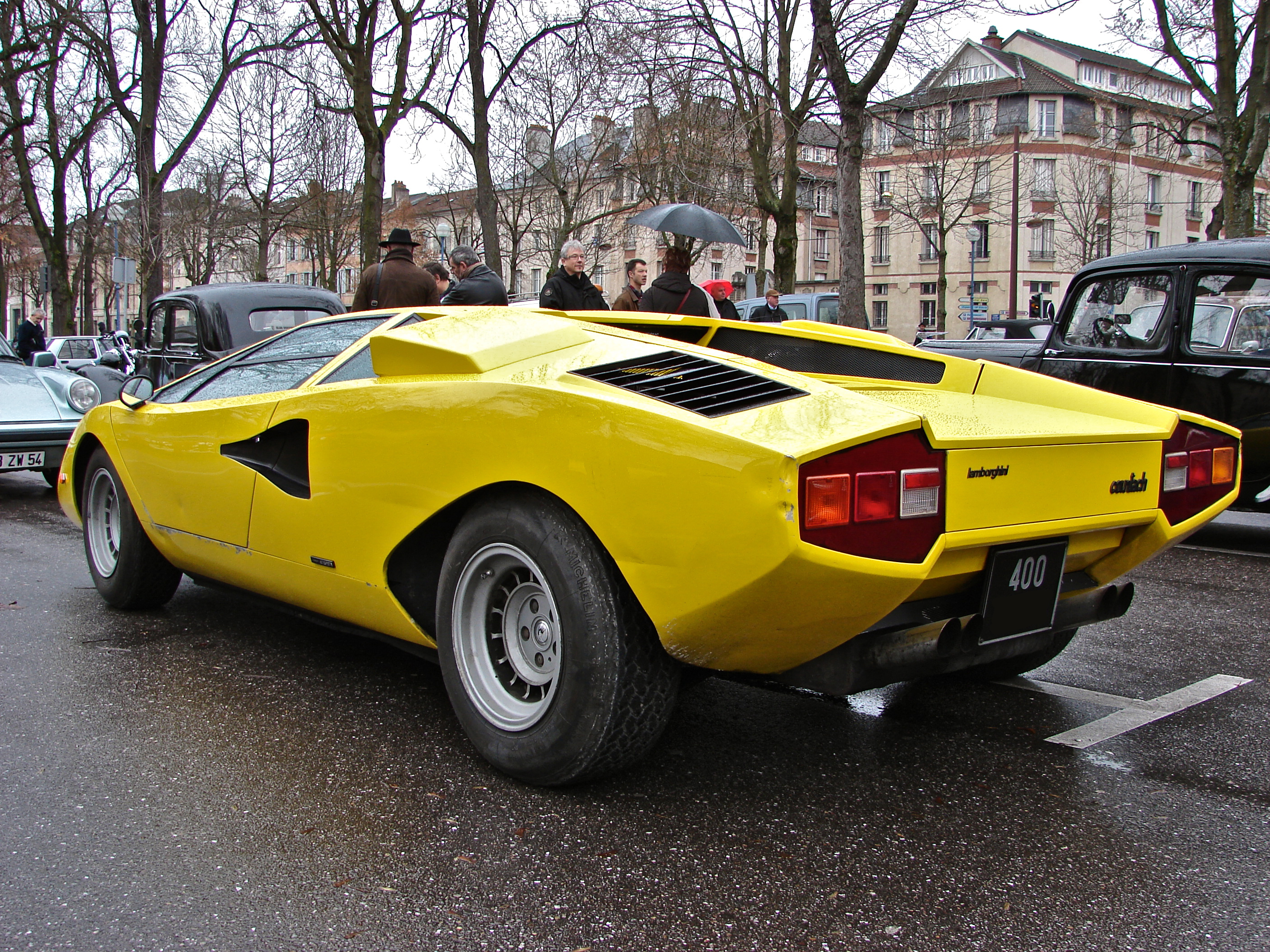
Countach LP400 (rear)

The first production model of the Countach was the LP400, produced from 1974 until 1978. It was first offered for sale at the 1974 Geneva Auto Show, where 50 orders were placed. The LP400 was equipped with a 3,929 cc (3.9 L) engine delivering 276 kW (375 PS; 370 hp) at 8,000rpm and 266 lb⋅ft torque at 5,500 rpm. This engine was given the type designation "L 406."

Externally, little had changed from the second prototype. The nose panel was altered, the side windows now split horizontally, and various details of interior trim were changed. The LP400 was equipped with Michelin XWX tires, sized front 205/70R14 and rear 215/70R14. The narrow tires and the slick styling meant that this version had the lowest drag coefficient of any Countach model. The emblems at the rear simply read "Lamborghini" and "Countach", with no engine displacement or valve arrangement markings as is found on later variants.

The LP400 chassis was constructed by Marchesi, then delivered to the Lamborghini factory at Sant'Agata where the car was assembled and painted. The engine and transmission were also manufactured at Sant'Agata. Each engine was run for a total of 5 hours and inspected before being installed in the car. The LP400 production line was developed and supervised by Giancarlo Guerra, a former Scaglietti employee who worked closely with Stanzani. By the end of production in 1978, the company had produced 157 Countach LP400s.

=== LP400 S (1978–1982) ===
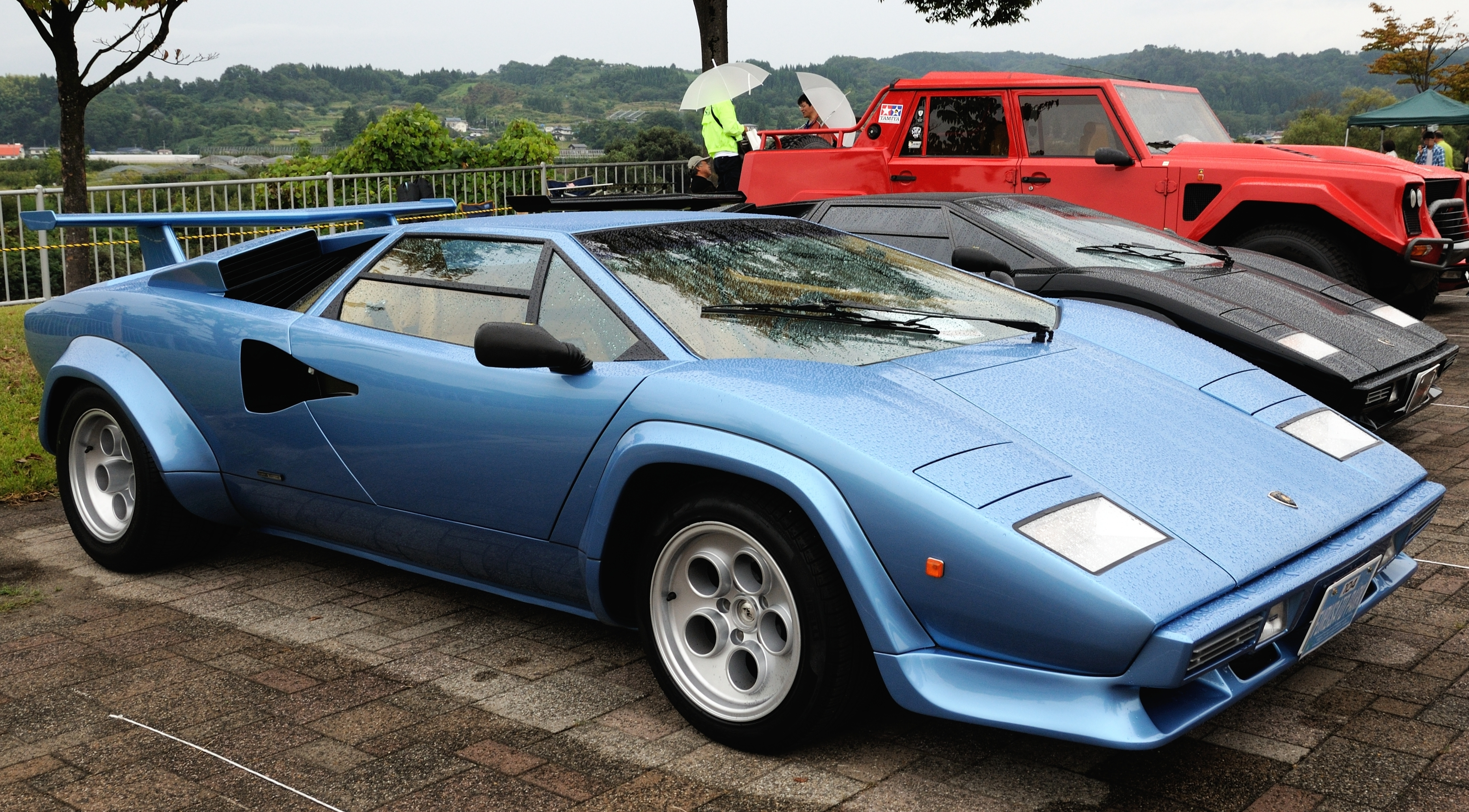
1978 Countach LP400 S in Japan (front)

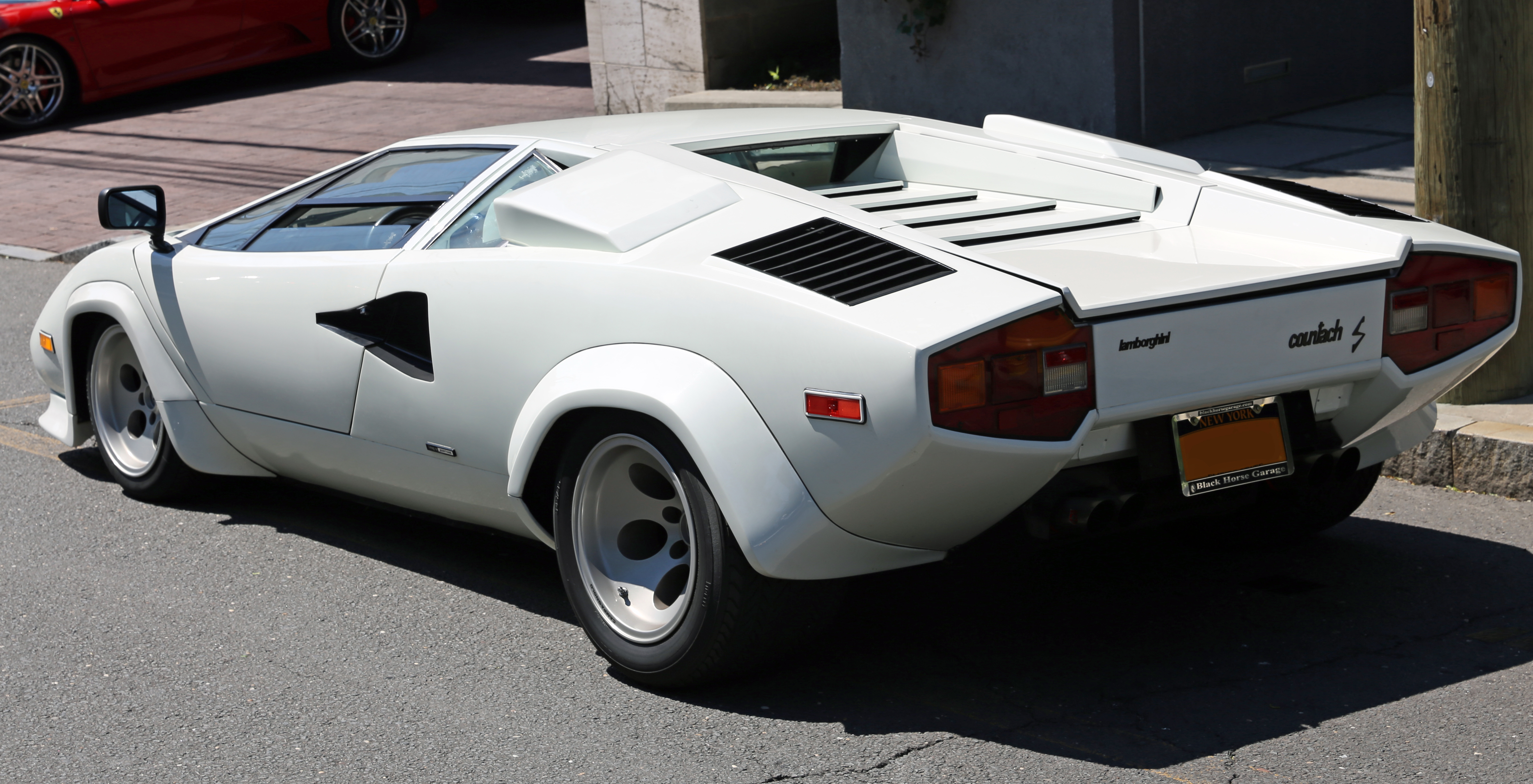
1981 Countach LP400 S grey market United States example (rear)

In 1978, a new LP400 S model was introduced. The engine was slightly downgraded from the LP400 model at 350 PS (257 kW; 345 hp) at 7,500rpm with torque the same as before. The most radical changes were on the exterior, where the tyres were replaced with 345/35R15 Pirelli P7 tyres; the widest tyres available on a production car at the time, and fiberglass wheel arch extensions were added, giving the car the fundamental look it kept until the end of its production run. An optional V-shaped rear wing was available from dealerships over the rear deck following the popularity generated from the rear wing of the Walter Wolf Countach, which, while improving high-speed stability, reduced the top speed by at least 16 km/h (10 mph). Most owners ordered the car with the wing despite this disadvantage. The LP400 S' handling was improved by the wider tyres, which made the car more stable while cornering. The standard emblems ("Lamborghini" and "Countach") were kept at the rear, but an angular "S" emblem was added after the "Countach" on the right side.

There are three distinct Countach LP400 S Series:

- Series One: 50 were produced. The final chassis number of this series was 1121100. Series I cars can be identified by distinctive Campagnolo "Bravo" wheels with protruding hole edges, 45 mm (1.8 in) carburetors and a lowered suspension ride height. Early Series One cars used small Stewart-Warner dashboard gauges, which were changed to larger versions halfway through 1979. The very early 1978 cars had the original, unpadded LP400 steering wheel, while later cars used a different, padded style.
- Series Two: 105 were produced. The final chassis number of this series was 1121310. Series II cars can be identified by their smooth, concave wheels and lowered ("lowbody") suspension ride height.
- Series Three: 82 were produced. The first chassis number of this series was 1121312 and the final chassis number was 1121468. Series III cars can be identified by their increased suspension ride height compared to series I and II cars. The usable interior space was also increased by 3 cm (1.2 in).

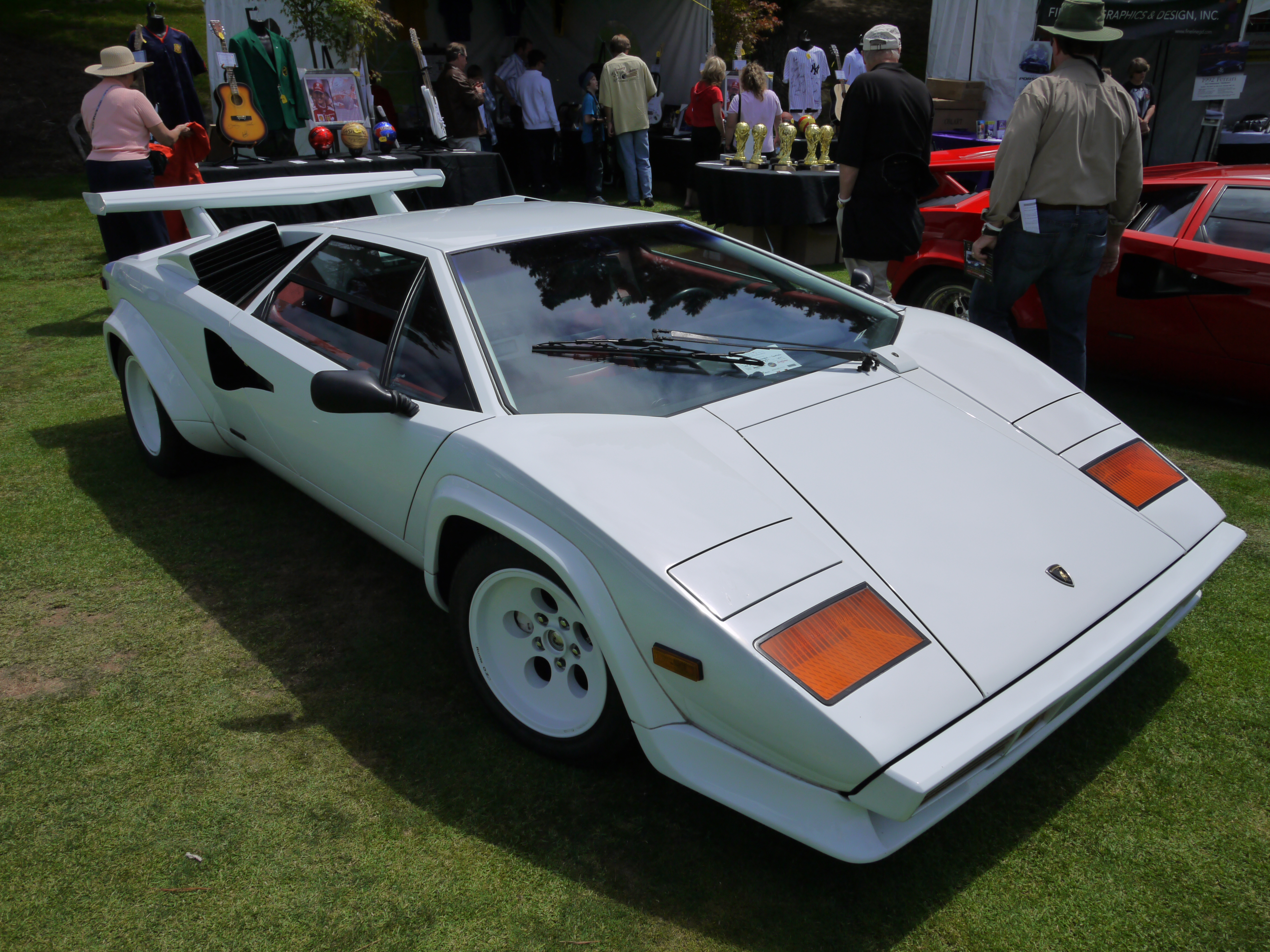
Countach LP500 S

=== LP500 S (1982–1985) ===
1982 saw another update to the Countach, with a larger displacement, more powerful 4,754 cc (4.8 L) engine. Maximum power grew slightly to 276 kW (375 PS; 370 hp) at 7,000 rpm and 302 lb⋅ft (409 N⋅m) of torque at 4,500 rpm. The bodywork was unaltered, however, the interior was given an update. This variant is sometimes called the 5000 S in some markets, which may cause confusion with the later 5000 QV. 321 cars were built.

=== LP5000 Quattrovalvole (1985–1988) ===
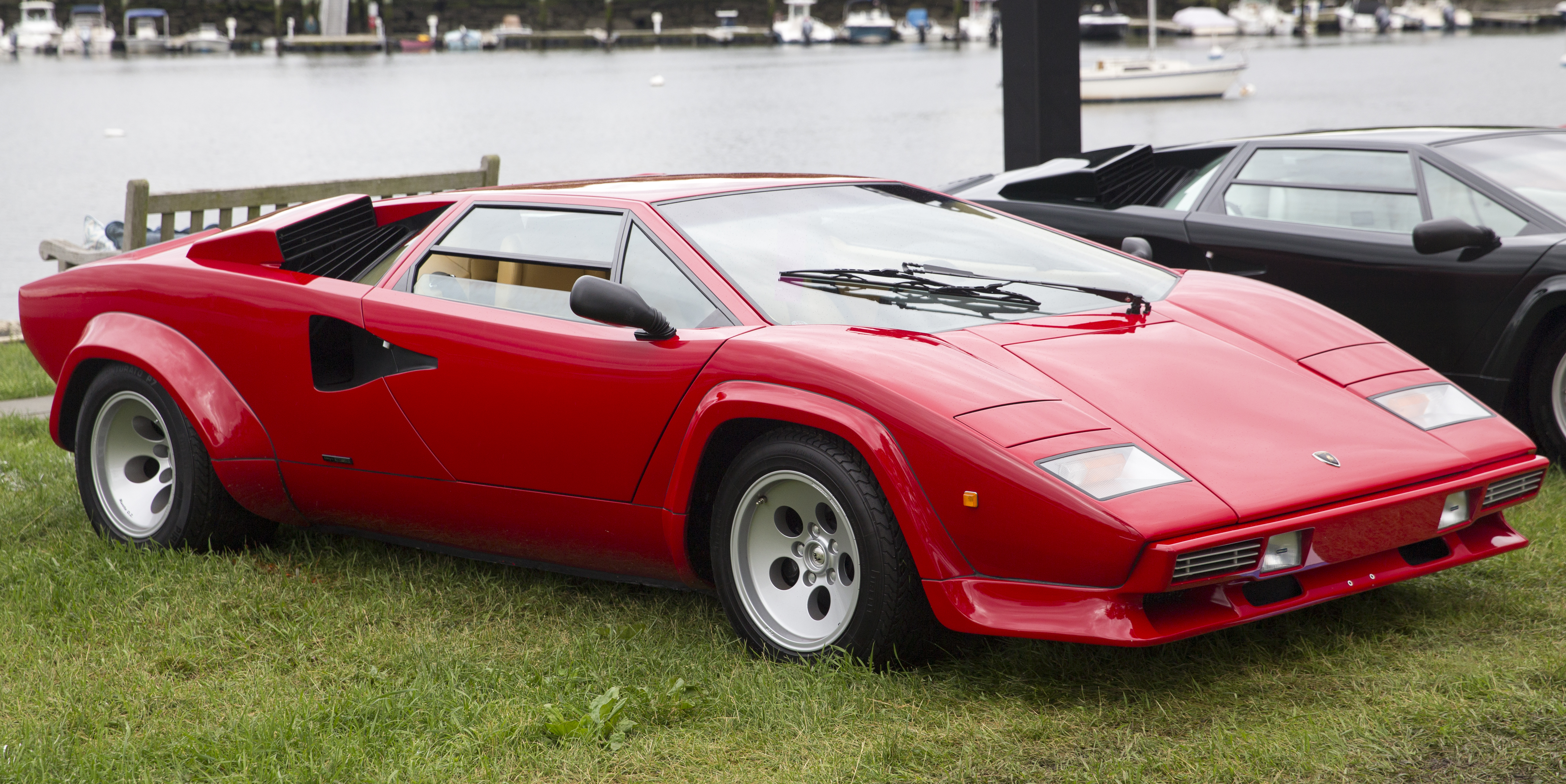
Countach LP5000 QV without the optional rear wing

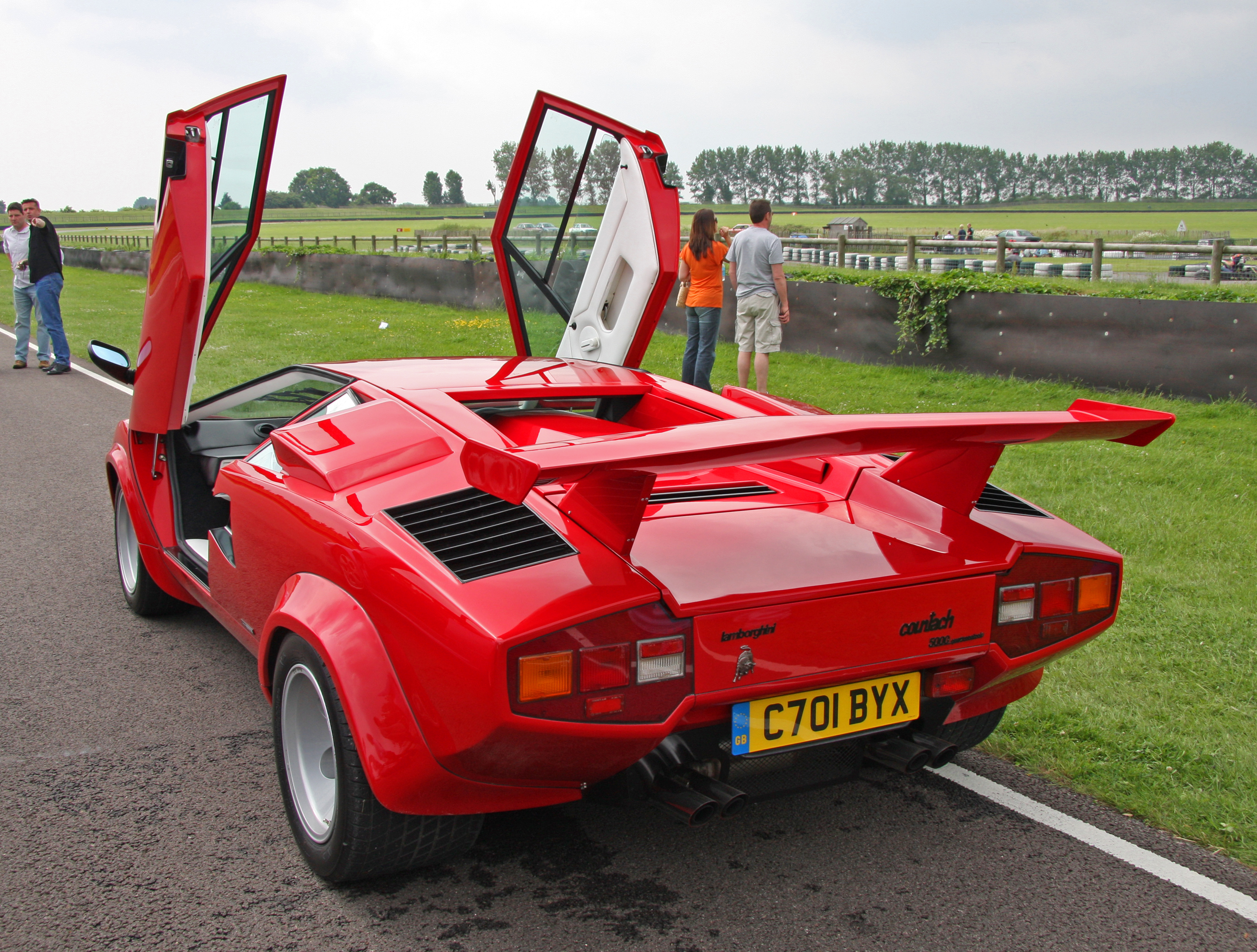
Countach LP5000 QV (rear)

In 1985, the engine design evolved again, as it was bored and stroked to 5,167 cc (5.2 L) and given 4 valves per cylinder—quattro valvole in Italian, hence the model's name, Countach LP5000 Quattrovalvole or 5000 QV in short. The carburetors were moved from the sides to the top of the engine for better cooling—unfortunately this created a hump on the engine cover, reducing the already poor rear visibility to almost zero. Some body panels were also replaced by Kevlar. In later versions of the engine, the carburetors were replaced with Bosch K-Jetronic fuel injection system. The fuel injected engine was rated at 313 kW (426 PS; 420 hp) and 461 N⋅m (340 lb⋅ft). The European carbureted (also known as "Downdraft" or "DD") versions used six Weber carburetors and were rated at 335 kW (455 PS; 449 hp) at 7,000 rpm and 500 N⋅m (369 lb⋅ft) of torque at 5,200 rpm. 610 cars were built in this specification, with 66 having the fuel injection system.

On the 26th of June 2024, a Lego set of the car was made available.

=== 25th Anniversary Edition (1988–1990) ===
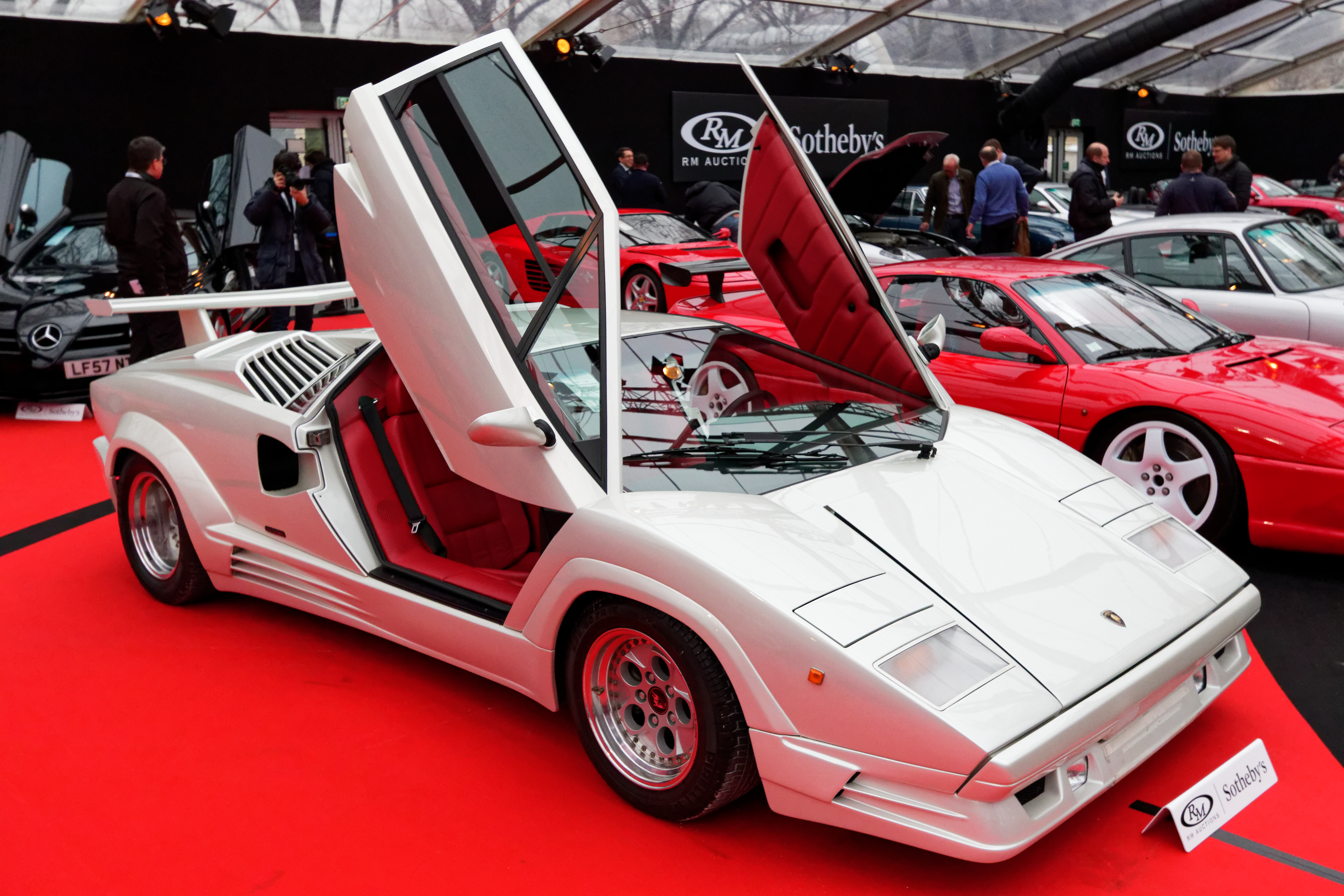
Countach 25th Anniversary Edition (front)

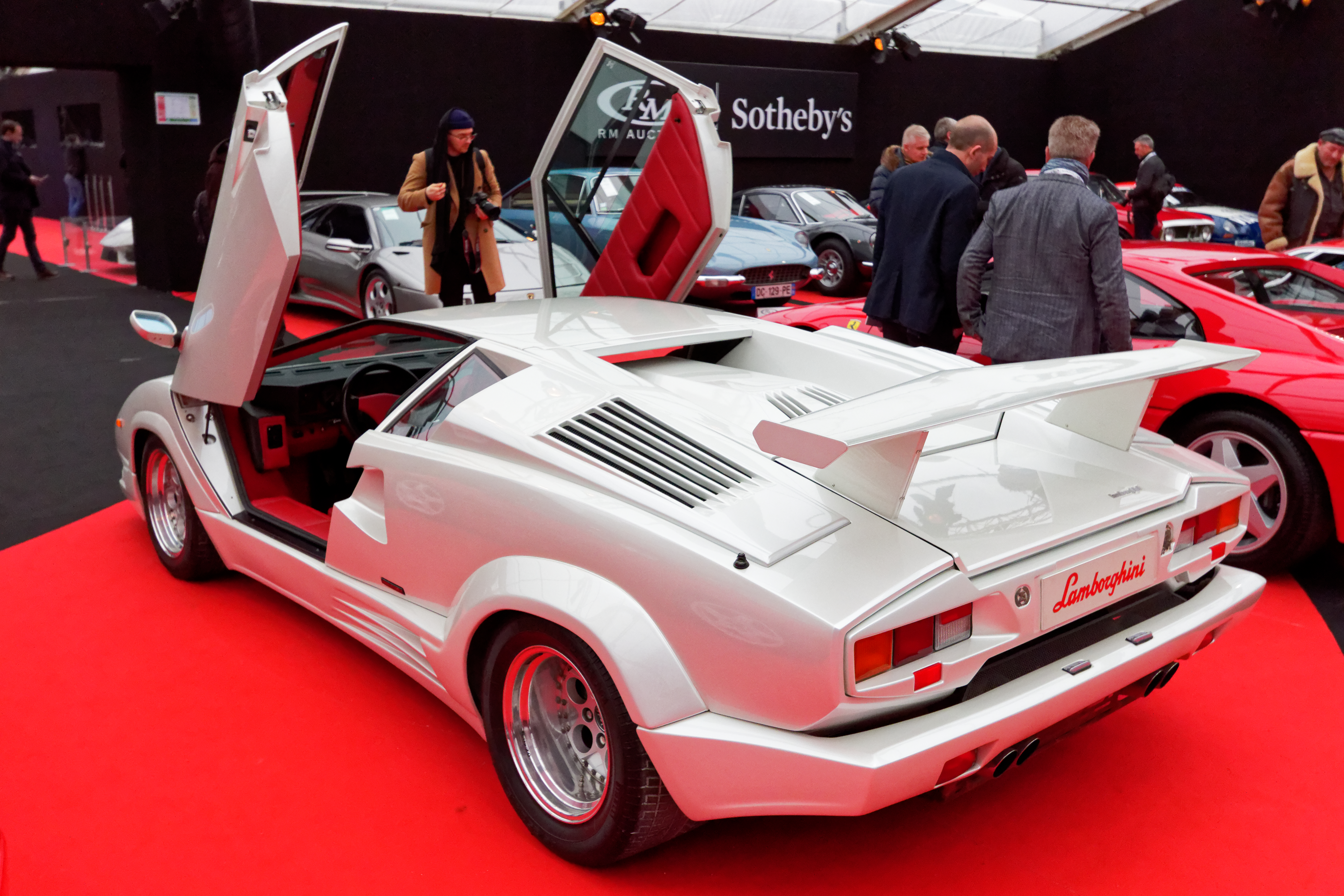
Countach 25th Anniversary Edition (rear)

Named to honour the company's twenty-fifth anniversary in 1988, the 25th Anniversary Countach, although mechanically very similar to the 5000QV, sported considerable restyling done by Horacio Pagani. Notably, enlargement and extension of the rear 'air-box' intake-ducts was among other refinements undertaken (extending them to a more gradual incline further in-keeping with aerodynamic-streamlining), while the secondary pair of debossed ducts, originally situated further behind them, were brought forward and relocated directly on top, encompassing refashioned fins now running longitudinally rather than transversely. This allowed the airboxes, before located behind the radiators, to be rotated from a transverse to a longitudinal position, allowing better airflow from the radiators out through the secondary fins. Additionally, the already modified engine-bay cover was further reconstructed, from a concept consisting of dual-raised sections and tri-ducting, to one that embodies a centre-raised section incorporating dual-ducting. Various redevelopments to the rear were made; most notably the introduction of a rear bumper extending outwardly from the lower-portion.

These styling changes, particularly features such as the fin strakes within the primary rear-intake-ducts openings, appeared to mimic the Ferrari Testarossa, though providing crucial improved engine cooling. Nonetheless it was only outsold by the QV model. It continued to feature 345/35R15 tyres. The 25th Anniversary edition was produced up until 1990 before being superseded by the Lamborghini Diablo.

The 25th Anniversary Edition was the most refined and possibly the fastest variant of the Lamborghini Countach, accelerating from 0 to 97 km/h (0 to 60 mph) in 4.7 seconds and achieving a top speed of 295 km/h (183 mph).

== North America ==
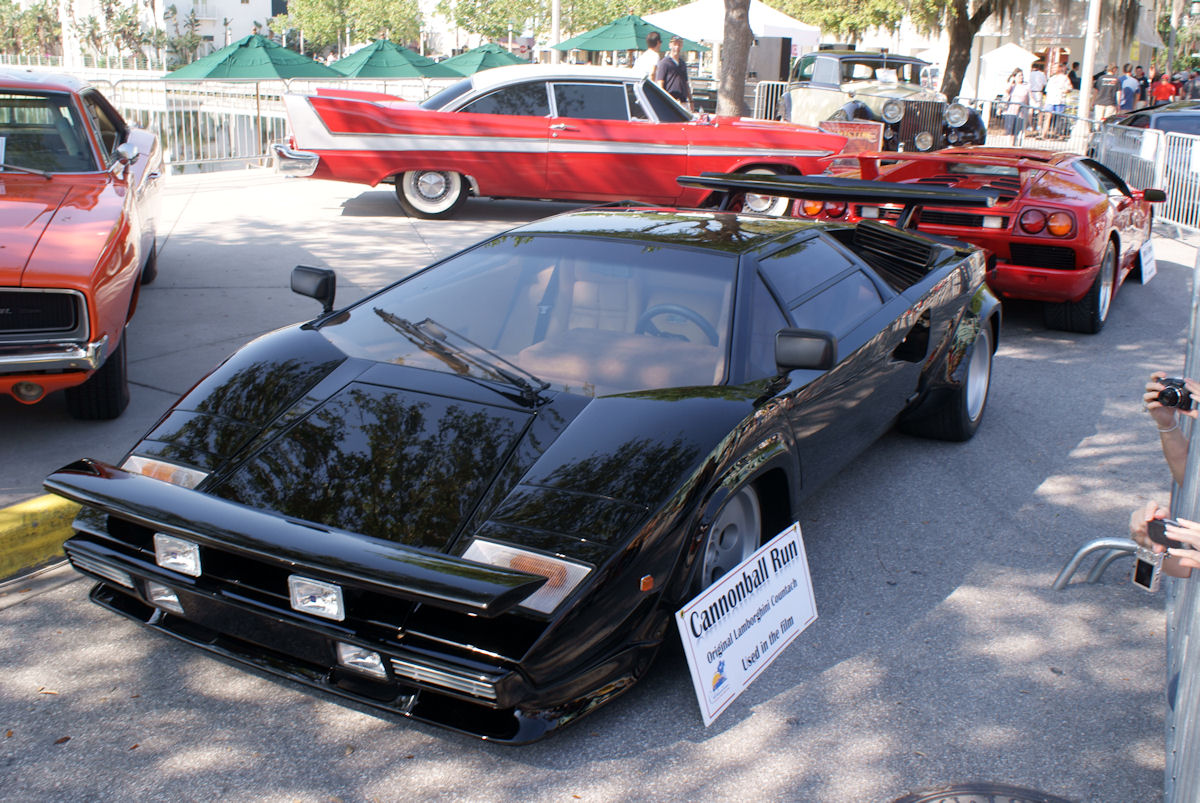
A 1979 U.S. model Countach LP400S used in the American film The Cannonball Run – note upper front spoiler unique to grey market cars

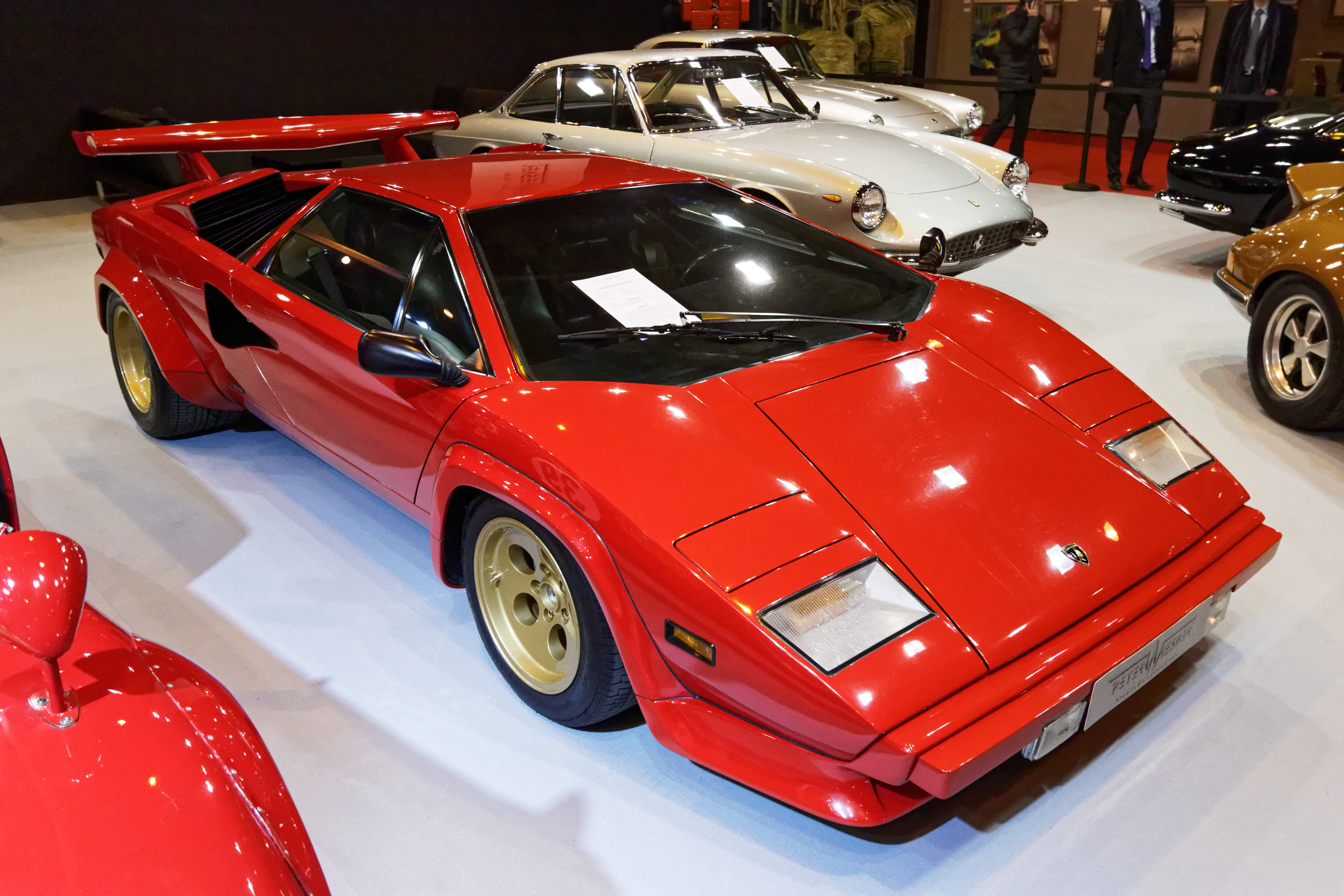
A 1981 U.S. model Countach LP400S - note the distinctive bumpers and side marker lights.

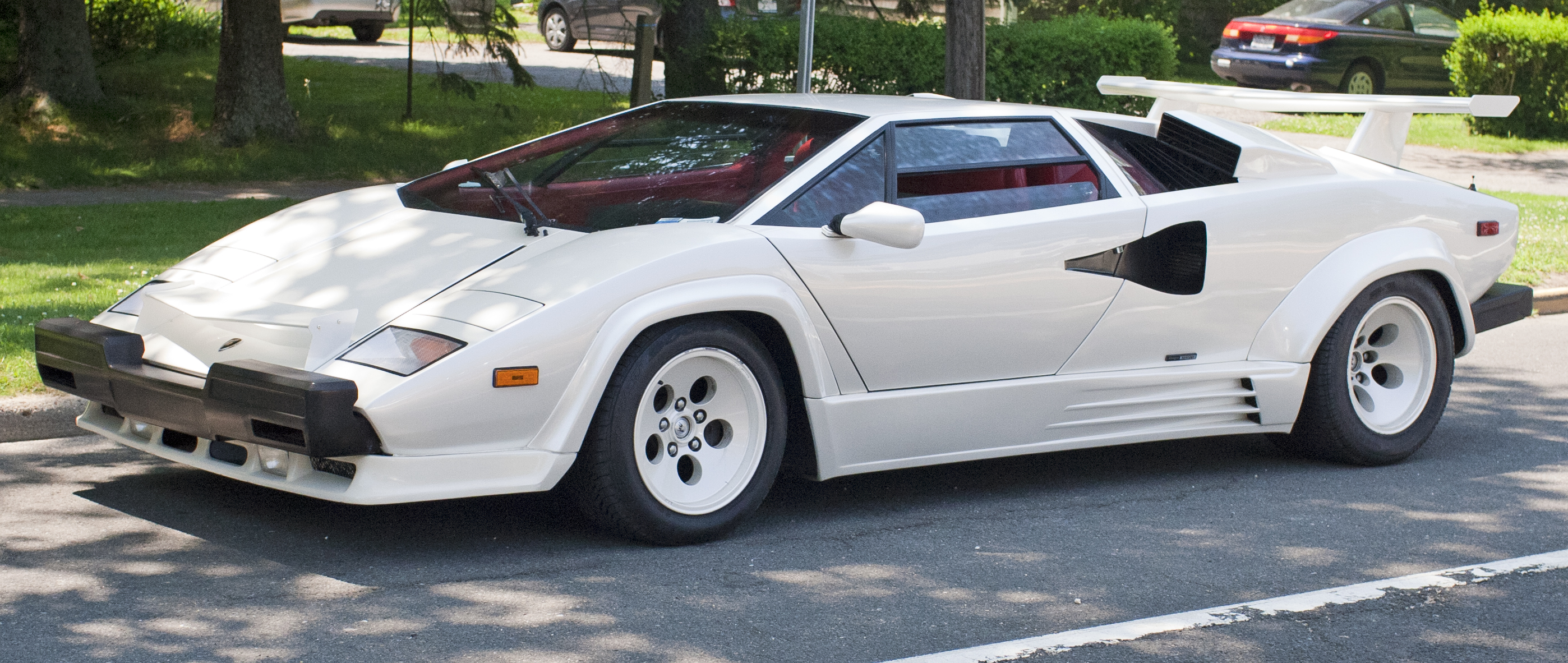
A 1985 U.S. model Countach LP5000 QV with US specification bumpers and added non-original side skirts.

The United States is Lamborghini's biggest market and has traditionally been the largest market in the world for expensive cars such as exotic sports cars. However, neither the Countach, nor its closest competitor, the Ferrari Berlinetta Boxer, were built from the factory to meet United States or Canadian safety and emissions regulations.

Americans purchased the Countach anyway, and individual consumers paid to modify each vehicle to meet United States Environmental Protection Agency and United States Department of Transportation regulations. This was known as the grey market era (1976-1988). While the Countach, Ferrari Berlinetta Boxer, and Range Rover were among the first such vehicles, the infrastructure they created allowed the "grey market" to reach 66,900 vehicles in 1985.

In 1985, with the introduction of the 5000 QV, a U.S. specification model was produced by the factory, meeting United States federal safety and emissions regulations. Changes to the American specification models included larger energy-absorbing bumpers, as the original bumper design did not meet the American "5 mile per hour" regulation (1974–1981), and a Bosch K-Jetronic fuel injection system. Many owners removed the bumpers immediately or received their new cars without bumpers installed.

American federal law exempts all vehicles older than 25 years from all design, safety, and emission regulations. Therefore, any original Countach can be freely imported into the US and registered for unrestricted road use in states that permit such activity.

== Special versions ==
=== Walter Wolf Countach ===
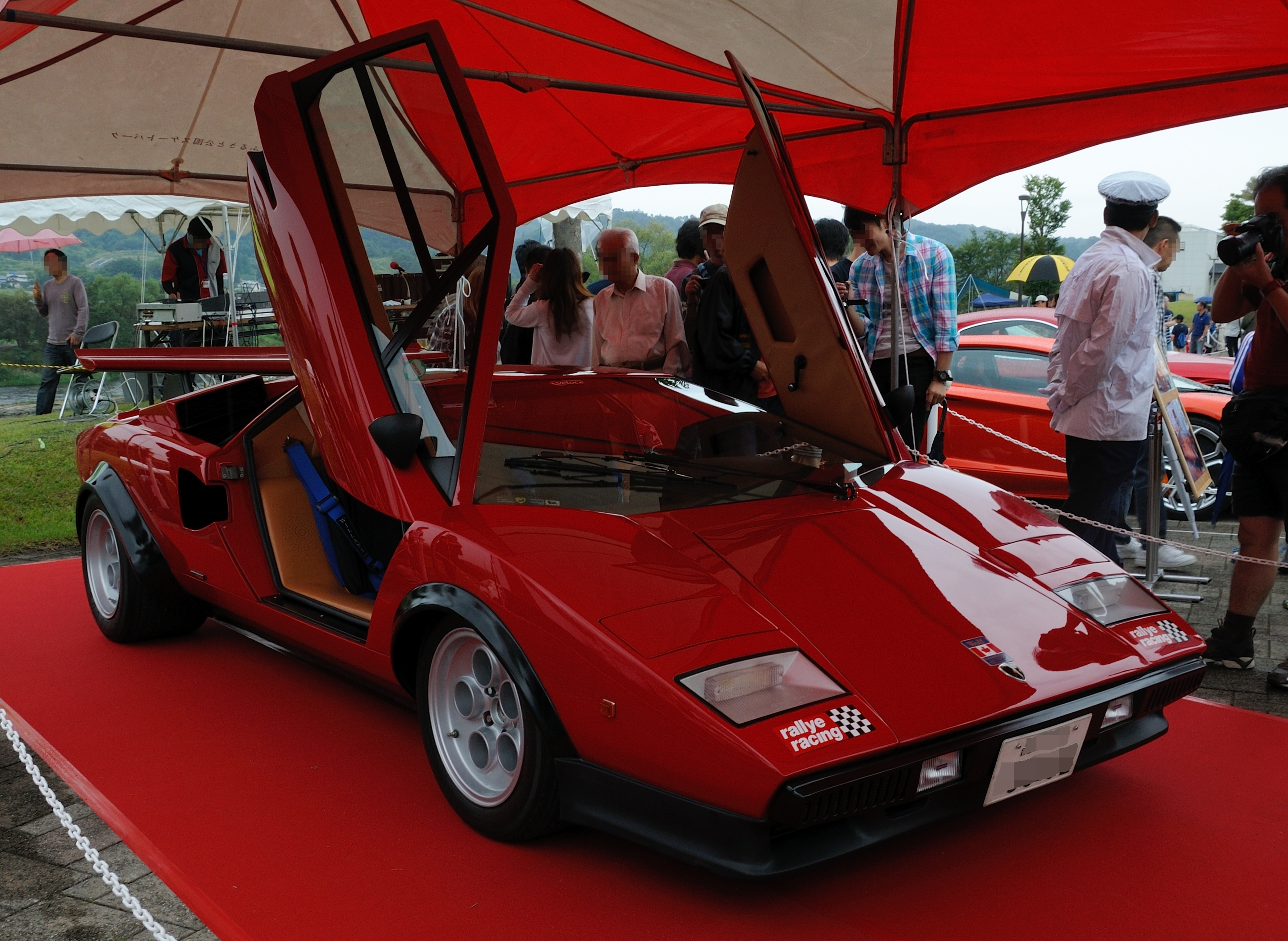
Walter Wolf Countach (front)

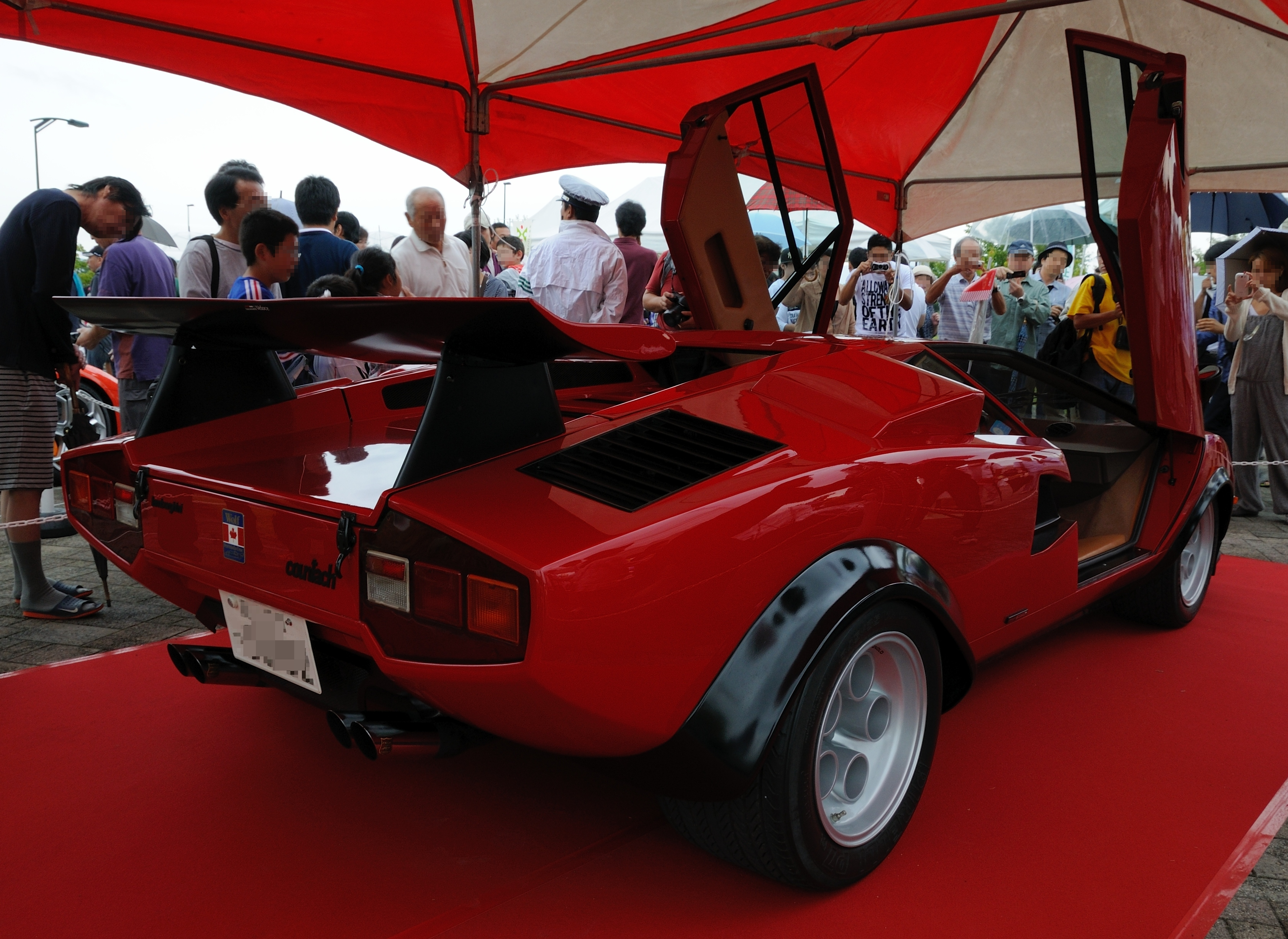
Walter Wolf Countach (rear)

In 1975, Walter Wolf, a wealthy Canadian businessman and owner of the Wolf F1 Racing team in the 1970s, purchased an LP400; however, he was not satisfied with the LP400's engine and asked Giampaolo Dallara to create a special high-power version of the Countach. Dallara was the former chief engineer at Lamborghini and had founded his own company, Dallara Automobili, in 1972. Dallara modified chassis 1120148 to create the "Walter Wolf Special" with an engine identical to the 5.0 L (310 cu in) engine from the original 1971 LP500 prototype, which generated 333 kW (453 PS; 447 hp) at 7,900 rpm and enabled the car to attain a theoretical maximum speed of 315 or 324 km/h (196 or 201 mph). This model also featured upgraded wheels, Pirelli P7 tyres, flared arches, and front and rear spoilers, all features that would become integrated on future Countach's starting with the LP400 S. Wolf's car was painted red with black flared arches, was designated "LP500 S" like the standard Countach model from the 1980s, and was the key stepping stone that led to the development of these later production models.

Two subsequent Wolf Specials were produced, the first, painted Bugatti blue, No. 1120202 was kept by the factory, and the last, a darker navy blue, No. 1121210 was the very first LP400 S and presented at the 1978 Geneva Motor Show. Both of the later Wolf cars used the original 5.0-litre engine commissioned by Wolf, transplanted to each car in turn.

=== Countach Turbo S ===
During the early 1980s, two modified turbocharged Countachs were commissioned by Max Bobnar, the official Lamborghini distributor in Switzerland. Bobnar hired Master Technician Franz Albert to convert the cars to a twin-turbo configuration and to make other performance modifications unique to the two prototypes; this was accomplished between 1980 and 1982. One was based on an LP500 S and was painted black, while the other was based on a Series I LP400 S and painted metallic red. The LP500 S Turbo was presented to the public at the 1984 Geneva Motor Show.

The LP500 S twin turbo weighed 1,515 kg (3,340 lb), while its 4.8 litre twin-turbocharged V12 engine had a claimed maximum power output of 748 PS (550 kW; 738 hp) and 876 N⋅m (646 lb⋅ft) of torque, enabling the car to accelerate from 0–100 km/h (62 mph) in 3.68 seconds and attain a top speed of 333 km/h (207 mph). A manual boost controller, located beneath the steering wheel, could be used to adjust the boost pressure from 0.7 bar to 1.5 bar at which the engine generated its maximum power output. The Turbo S has 15" wheels with 255/45 tyres on the front and 345/35 on the rear.

=== Countach QVX ===
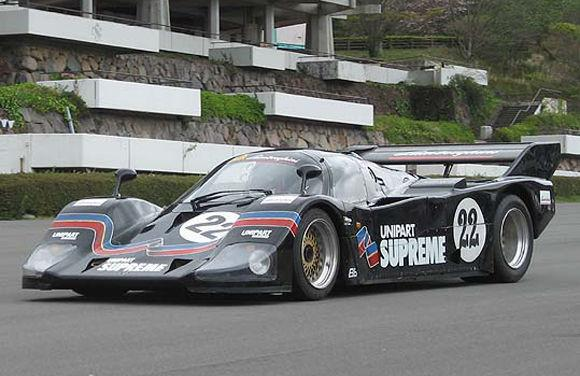
Countach QVX

The Countach QVX was a short-lived Group C sports racing car built in 1985. It was not built or designed by the Lamborghini factory, but instead used a Spice Engineering and CC engineering built chassis and an engine derived from the Lamborghini Countach's V12 having a displacement of 5.7-litres. This engine was reported to generate a maximum power output between 485–522 kW (659–710 PS; 650–700 hp) depending on track conditions and utilised a Hewland VG-C racing transmission. The engine was built under the direction of Luigi Marmiroli and used data derived from Lamborghini's marine engines. Lamborghini's British importer David Jolliffe commissioned the car. The car was entered in the 1985 season of LeMans but didn't have any success despite keeping up with the winning Jaguar. It was entered again in the 1986 season by its sponsor, Unipart, but the funding soon ran out and the car was pulled out of competition.

=== F1 safety car ===
Between 1980 and 1983, Formula One employed the Countach as its safety car during the Monaco Grand Prix.

=== Countach Evoluzione ===
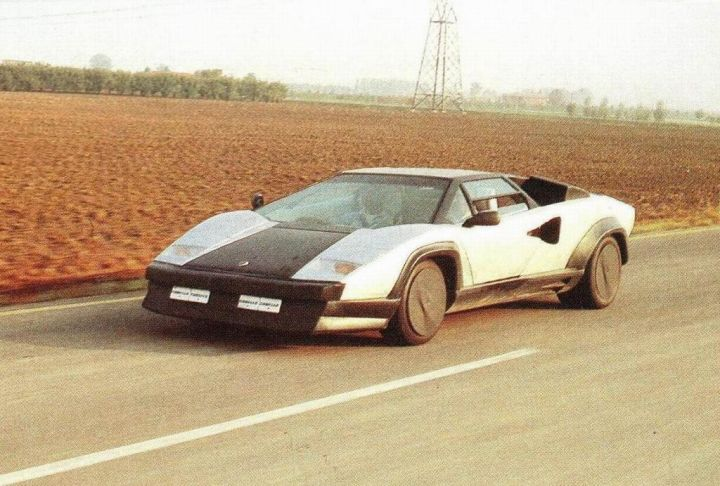
Countach Evoluzione prototype

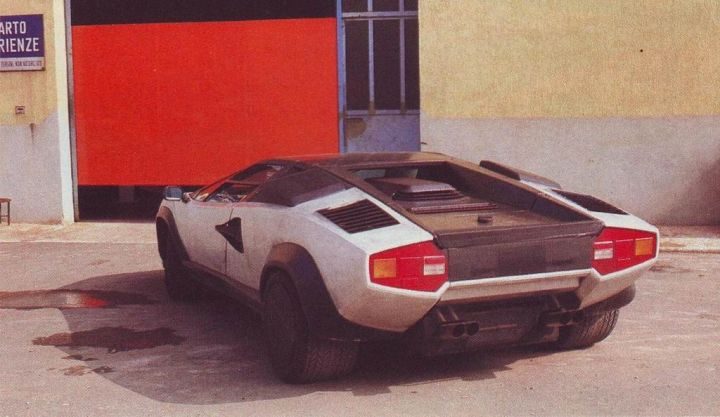
Evoluzione rear view

The Countach Evoluzione was a one-off prototype and testbed car built by Lamborghini in 1987. It was developed by Lamborghini's engineering team in order to test multiple technologies for the Countach's successor. The Evoluzione used a substantially different chassis and body than the production Countach and lacked interior trim, soundproofing and air-conditioning. It was continually modified for testing purposes and all body panels were left unpainted. Although there was no production version of the Evoluzione, the Countach Anniversary Edition and the Diablo would incorporate some of its engineering, including carbon fibre/Kevlar composite body panels.

The Evoluzione was built on an all-new chassis but used engine, suspension and wheels from the Countach LP5000QV production model, although all these components would be modified during testing. While based on the production engine, the Evoluzione engine was blueprinted for greater performance and generated approximately 368 kW (500 PS; 493 hp). The transmission was modified with a short throw shifter but was otherwise the same as the production version. The Evoluzione accelerated from 0 to 97 km/h (0 to 60 mph) in approximately 4 seconds and had a reported top speed around 320 km/h (200 mph).

The most radical change from the production Countach was a new chassis and body incorporating many composite materials, including Kevlar and carbon fibre-reinforced plastics and aluminum honeycomb panels. The tubular steel space frame chassis of the production Countach was completely replaced with a new composite unibody structure. The front boot lid, rear engine cover, front air dam and wheel arches were made of carbon/Kevlar composite, while the wings and doors used more conventional but still lightweight aluminum panels. Aerodynamic wheel covers made from composite materials were also tested but were found to increase heat build-up and brake fade. These changes resulted in a radical weight reduction of approximately 397 kg (876 lb) compared to the contemporary LP5000QV production model. The new body also reduced the drag coefficient by approximately 10%. The 1988 Countach Anniversary edition incorporated features of the Evoluzione body, including several composite panels and air intakes integrated into the lower door sills.

Lamborghini engineers used the Evoluzione as a testbed for many other technologies during its existence. These included a 4WD drivetrain, electronically controlled ride height, active suspension, ABS, and retractable, low-drag windscreen wipers.

Although contemporary publications mention the possibility of a limited production run based on the Evoluzione, the car never entered production. The single Countach Evoluzione prototype was destroyed by the Lamborghini factory during crash testing and no longer exists.

=== Countach L150 ===
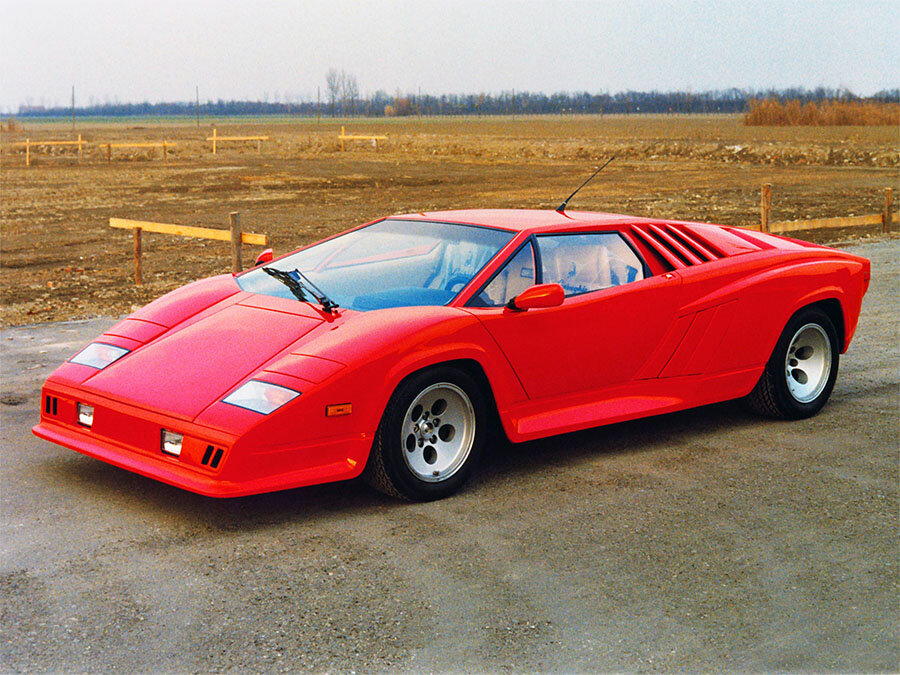
Lamborghini Countach L150

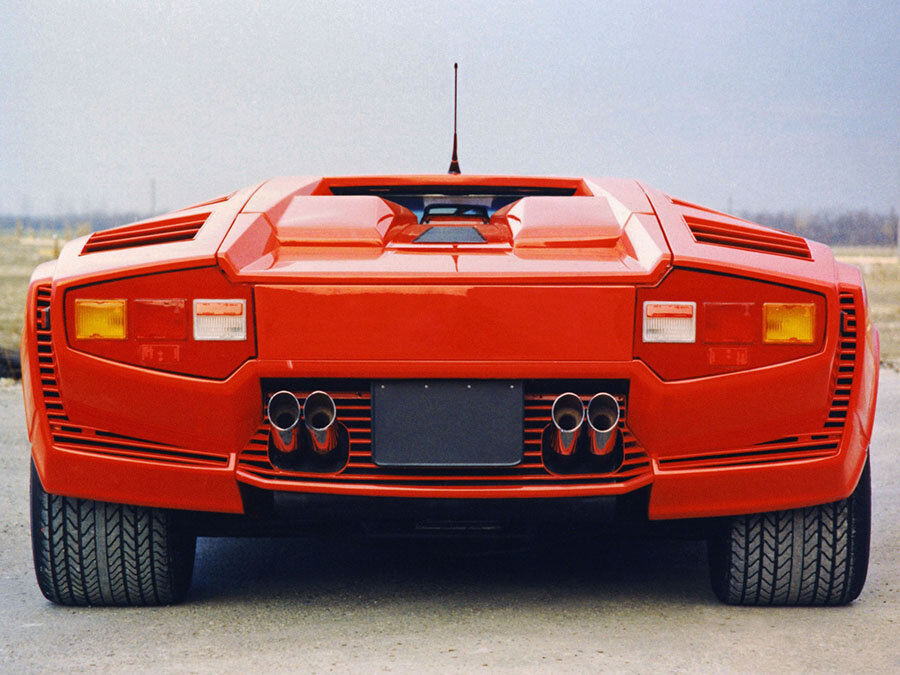
Lamborghini Countach L150 rear

The Countach L150 was a one-off prototype developed between 1984 and 1987 under the supervision of engineer Giulio Alfieri. The L150 was intended to represent a new Countach-based production model. It was developed into a fully functional prototype at the request of Lamborghini owner and CEO Patrick Mimran. Mimran was presented with two approaches for future Lamborghini models in the mid 1980s: Alfieri wished to continue developing the Countach, while newly hired engineer Luigi Marmiroli began designing a new model which would become the Diablo. The L150 represented Alfieri's approach, and included many body panels intended to improve engine cooling and update the car's styling. Efforts were also taken to improve the car's comfort, such as installing electric windows. Mimran eventually rejected the L150 due to cost concerns, instead choosing a less ambitious update of the Countach with the 25th Anniversary Edition while also approving further development of Marmiroli's Diablo concept. In 1987, Mimran acquired the L150 for his personal collection. In 1989, it was sold to Lamborghini collector Minoru Miura and still remains in his collection as of 2021.

== Production figures ==
A total of 1,983 cars were built during the Countach's sixteen-year lifetime:

LP500 Prototype	LP400	LP400 S	LP500 S	5000 QV	25th Anniversary
1	157	237	321	610	657

Substantially more than half were built in the final five years of production, as Lamborghini's new corporate owners increased production.

A small number of new Countachs were assembled in Cape Town, South Africa during the mid-1970s by local dealer and importer Intermotormakers (IMM). IMM imported Countachs and other Lamborghini models from the Lamborghini factory as complete knock-down kits. This import arrangement was active until the South African government revoked IMM's exemption to phase V of the local content programme, which took effect in 1980 and mandated that cars manufactured in South Africa incorporate a minimum of 66% locally produced content. The total number of Intermotormakers-assembled Countachs is unknown, but they constitute a very small fraction of Countach production.

== Engine data ==
Model	Displacement	Power	Torque	Compr. ratio	Fuel and induction systems
LP500 prototype	4,971 cc (303.3 cu in)	328 kW (446 PS; 440 hp)	448 N⋅m (330 lb⋅ft) at 5,750 rpm	10.5:1	Carburetor
LP400	3,929 cc (239.8 cu in)	276 kW (375 PS; 370 hp)	361 N⋅m (266 lb⋅ft) at 5,000 rpm	10.5:1	Carburetor
LP400 S	3,929 cc (239.8 cu in)	257 kW (350 PS; 345 hp)	356 N⋅m (263 lb⋅ft) at 5,000 rpm	10.5:1	Carburetor
LP500 S	4,754 cc (290.1 cu in)	276 kW (375 PS; 370 hp)	418 N⋅m (308 lb⋅ft) at 4,500 rpm	9.2:1	Carburetor
LP500 Turbo S prototype	4,754 cc (290.1 cu in)	550 kW (748 PS; 738 hp) at 6,500 rpm	876 N⋅m (646 lb⋅ft) at 4,500 rpm	N/A	Twin turbochargers, carburetor
5000 QV	5,167 cc (315.3 cu in)	335 kW (455 PS; 449 hp) at 7,000 rpm	500 N⋅m (369 lb⋅ft) at 5,200 rpm	9.5:1	6X2 44 DCNF Weber carburetors
25th Anniversary	5,167 cc (315.3 cu in)	335 kW (455 PS; 449 hp) at 7,000 rpm	500 N⋅m (369 lb⋅ft) at 5,200 rpm	9.5:1	6X2 44 DCNF Weber carburetors
5000 QV (US)	5,167 cc (315.3 cu in)	313 kW (426 PS; 420 hp) at 7,000 rpm	461 N⋅m (340 lb⋅ft) at 5,200 rpm	9.2:1	Bosch K-Jetronic
25th Anniversary (US)	5,167 cc (315.3 cu in)	313 kW (426 PS; 420 hp) at 7,000 rpm	461 N⋅m (340 lb⋅ft) at 5,200 rpm	9.2:1	Bosch K-Jetronic
Evoluzione prototype	5,167 cc (315.3 cu in)	335 kW (455 PS; 449 hp) at 7,000 rpm	N/A	9.5:1	Motronic fuel injection

== Performance and weight ==
Model	Top speed	Acceleration 0–100 km/h (0-62 mph)	Dry weight
LP500 prototype	300 km/h (186 mph) or 306 km/h / 190 mph)	4.2 to 5.5 s	1,130 kg (2,491 lb)
LP400	288 km/h (179 mph), 315 km/h (196 mph) claimed	5.4 s	1,065 kg (2,348 lb)
LP400 S	254 km/h (158 mph),279.6 km/h (174 mph) claimed	5.9 s	1,200 kg (2,646 lb)
LP500 S	293 km/h (182 mph)	5.2 s	1,480 kg (3,263 lb)
5000 QV	298 km/h (185 mph)	4.8 s	1,490 kg (3,285 lb)
25th Anniversary	298 km/h (185 mph)	4.5 s	1,590 kg (3,505 lb)
Evoluzione prototype	330 km/h (205 mph)	4.5 s	1,050 kg (2,315 lb)
LP500 Turbo S prototype	333 km/h (207 mph)	3.68 s	1,515 kg (3,340 lb)

== Countach LPI 800-4 ==
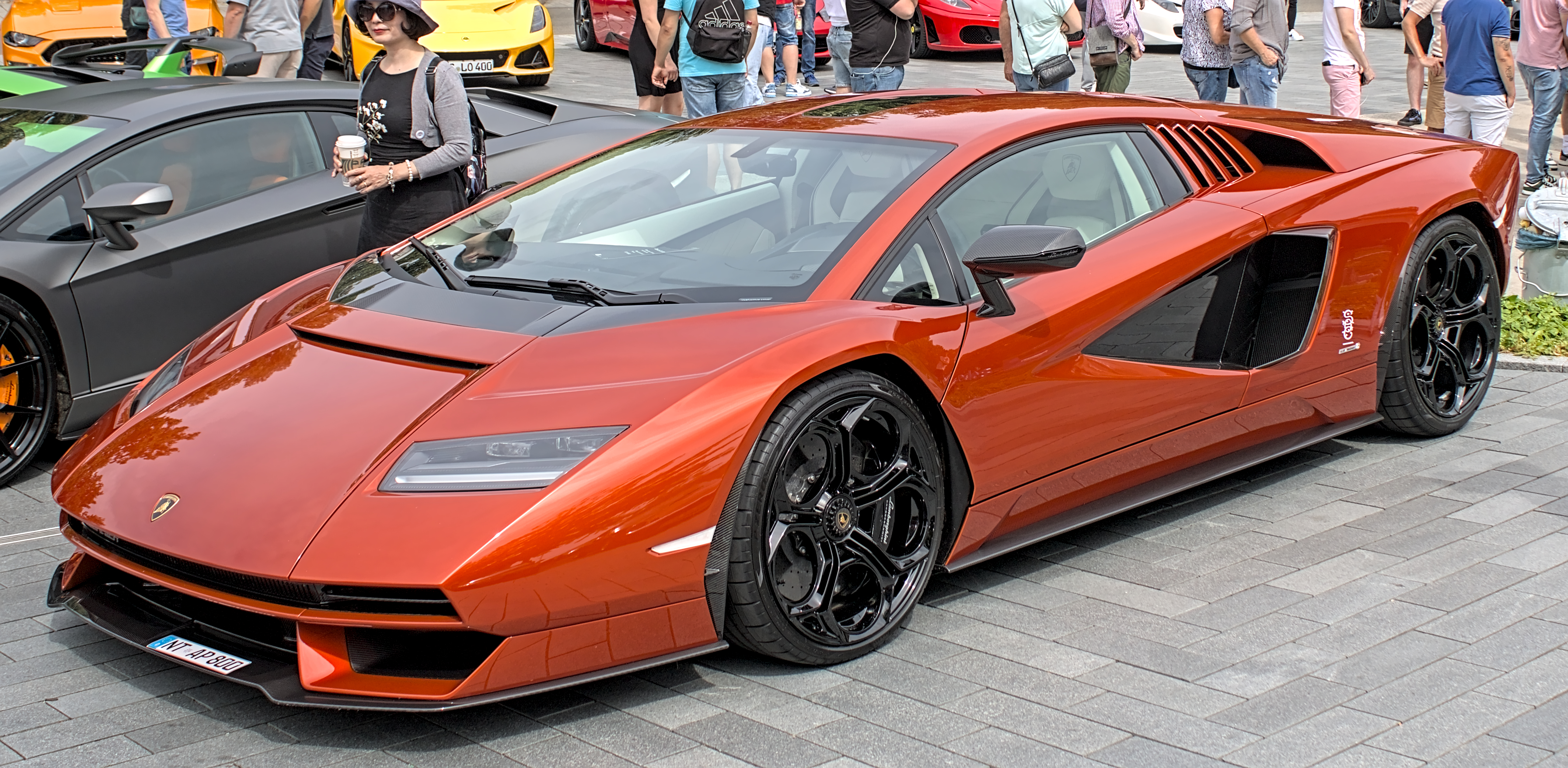
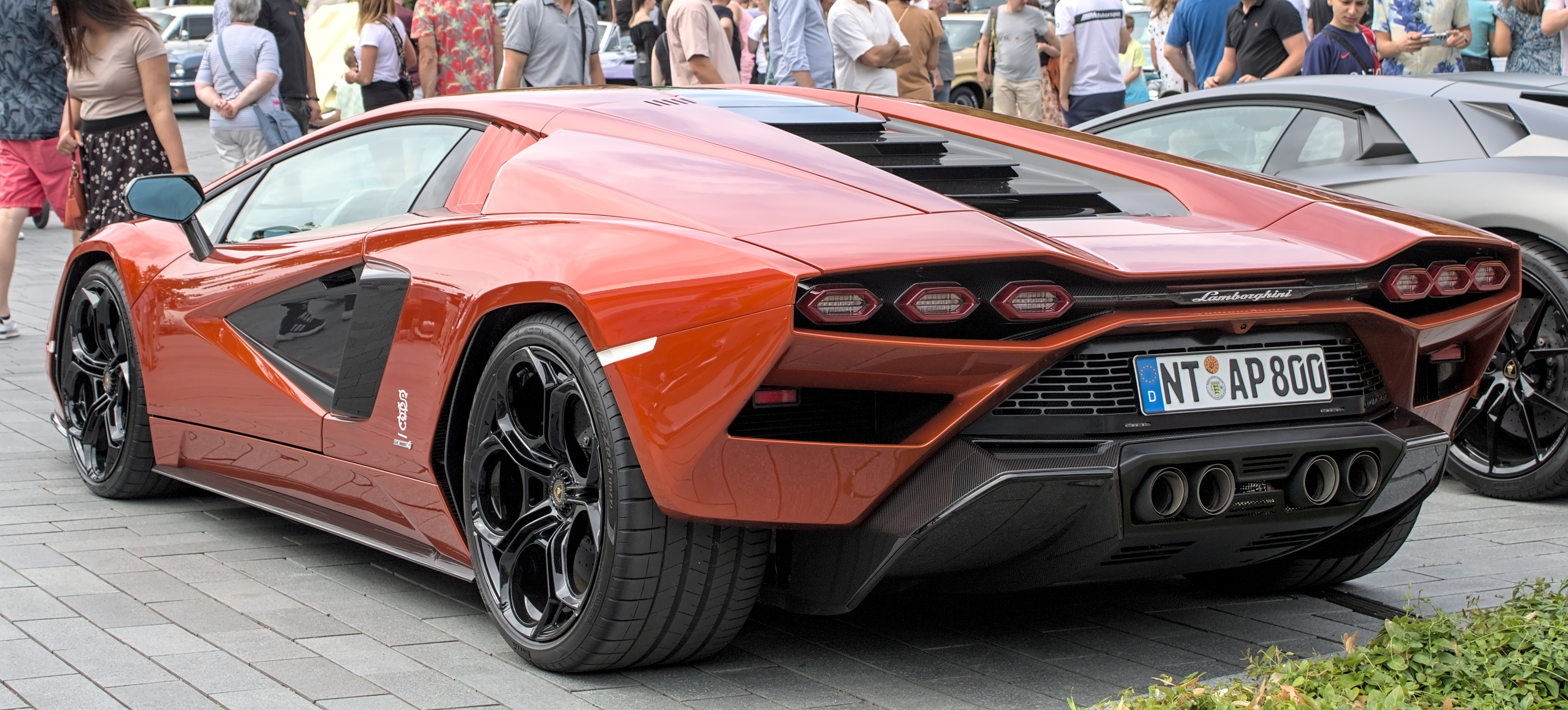
Lamborghini Countach LPI 800-4

To commemorate the 50th anniversary of Countach in 2021, the nameplate was reused on a limited-production hybrid-electric model called the Countach LPI 800-4, which has a naturally aspirated 6.5-litre V12 engine with a 48-volt electric motor based on the technology of the Sián FKP 37.
