= John Deere Powershift transmission =

The John Deere PowerShift transmission was an eight-speed semi-automatic transmission without a torque converter, used in John Deere tractors, including the John Deere Model 4020. The Powershift is not to be confused with similar John Deere transmissions (including the Quad-Range and the PowrQuad), or with the Ford Ultra Command Powershift or the Allis-Chalmers Power Director.
