= Shift time =

Time interval between gear changes in a transmission

Shift time refers to the time interval between gear changes in a transmission. This interval is the time in which power delivery is transferred to the next selected gear, and engine speed is reduced or increased to synchronize the speed of the next gear. Shift time is usually in reference to motor vehicles, but can apply to any gearbox. Shift time is measured by the time it takes for the engine rpm to synchronize with the next gear input speed target. This is illustrated by ZF, describing the 100-300 millisecond shifts of their DCT transmissions.

Reducing shift time is important in performance and racing vehicles because upshifting generally interrupts power delivery to the wheels. Shift time in a manual gearbox is dependent on the driver, but in automatic or automated manual cars, the electronic or hydraulic control system must be calibrated and tuned to execute fast gear changes. Historically, a dual-clutch transmission shifts faster than a standard hydraulic automatic transmission with a torque converter or a single-clutch automated manual transmission. This is possible because the DCT can pre-select the next gear and transfer torque from one clutch to the next clutch with the pre-selected next gear, thus reducing shift times. Standard planetary automatic transmissions have caught up to DCT transmission shift times by also utilizing clutch to clutch shifts. For older transmissions, using a freewheel may reduce shift time, as it may not be necessary to use the clutch. A shift kit is also intended to reduce the shift time of a manual vehicle.

With a manual transmission, upshift time can be reduced by installing a lighter flywheel. During an upshift, the engine speed must decrease to synchronize with a higher gear; a lighter flywheel will allow the engine speed to drop more quickly, leading to shorter shift times.

== Shift times ==
- A long shift time is considered anything over 625 milliseconds.
- The average manual car driver takes between 500 ms and 1 s to perform vertical gear changes (i.e. 1st-2nd, 3rd-4th, 5th-6th) and 1 - 2 s to perform horizontal gear changes (i.e. 2nd-3rd, 4th-5th). Shift time is also dependent on gear throws (distance between gears), ease of movement, ergonomics of the gear stick, and gearbox condition.
- For reference, the time it takes for a human to blink can be as quick as 100ms (.1 seconds)

=== Example upshift times ===
Please note that some manufacturers may have different definitions of shift times, this is not a complete list.

Vehicle	Transmission model	Transmission type	Shift time (ms)	Notes
McLaren 675LT	7 Speed SSG	Dual-Clutch	40	According to MotorTrend Article
Lamborghini Aventador	Graziano ISR	Automated manual	50	
Ferrari 430 Scuderia	Graziano F1	Automated manual	60	
Ferrari FXX Evoluzione	Graziano F1	Automated manual	60	
Maserati GranTurismo MC Stradale	Maserati MC Race Shift	Automated manual	60	With Race mode active
BMW M5 (E60)	BMW SMG III	Automated manual	65-250	
Ferrari FXX	Graziano F1	Automated manual	80	
Shelby GT500 (3rd generation)	Tremec TR-9070	Dual-clutch	80	
Bugatti Veyron	Volkswagen Group DSG	Dual-clutch	100	
Mercedes-Benz AMG GT-Line	Mercedes-Benz AMG SpeedShift	Dual-clutch	100	As little as 100ms, according to MB
Lexus LC 500	Aisin WR10L65	Hydraulic automatic	120	
Renault Clio RS 200 EDC Trophy (4th generation)	Renault EDC	Dual-clutch	<120	With Race mode active
Chevrolet Camaro ZL1 (6th generation)	Ford-GM 10L90	Hydraulic automatic	~150	
Ferrari Enzo	Graziano F1	Automated manual	150	
Nissan GT-R	BorgWarner GR6Z30A	Dual-clutch	150	With R Mode active
Lexus LFA Nürburgring edition	Aisin SA6	Automated manual	150	

== See also ==
- Powershifting
- Shift kit
