= Shift kit =

A shift kit is a set of components for automobiles designed to improve how well the car shifts between gears. Kits are made for both automatic and manual transmissions.

== Towing considerations ==
During a shift, power is lost in the clutch (for automatic transmissions the clutches are usually internal) due to clutch slip and the difference between the current and final output shaft speeds. This makes a quick shift more desirable when towing, to reduce clutch wear and heat developed in the transmission. Balancing this, too quick a shift increases peak mechanical loads on the transmission, engine and drive train; an instant shift would cause impact loads and lead to early mechanical failure, as well as an unpleasant driving experience.

== Manual transmission kit ==
For manual transmission equipped cars, it is a component that replaces the stock gear selector (shifter). A shift kit usually shortens the throws of selecting a gear (also known as a short throw shift or short shifter), therefore allowing a driver to reduce the shift time and change gears more efficiently.

== Automatic transmission kit ==
An automatic transmission's main focus is smooth shifting between gears. To accomplish this it often goes into two gears at once while shifting up, which is known as a shift overlap. In these cars, it is a kit that can reduce or eliminate the shift overlap. It will also reduce wear because the transmission won't be trying to drive in two gears at once.

== History ==
The term "Shift Kit" is a registered trademark of the company "TransGo" which originated the development of automatic transmission valve body improvement and upgrade components such as springs, valves, and instructional materials to improve the shift characteristics and durability of automatic transmissions.
